= List of women composers by name =

This article provides a list of women composers, sorted alphabetically by surname. For a list of women composers sorted by year of birth, see List of women composers by birth date.

== A ==
- Els Aarne (1917–1995)
- Mary Anne à Beckett (1817–1863)
- Keiko Abe (born 1937)
- Rosalina Abejo (1922–1991)
- Lora Aborn (1907–2005)
- Harriett Abrams (1758–1821)
- Mildred Adair (1895–1943)
- Ella Adayevskaya (née Schultz) (1846–1926)
- Maria Teresa Agnesi (1720–1795)
- Lejla Agolli (born 1950)
- Graciela Agudelo (1945–2018)
- Countess Maria Theresia Ahlefeldt (1755–1810)
- Sieglinde Ahrens (born 1936)
- Doris Akers (1923–1995)
- Toshiko Akiyoshi (born 1929)
- Alamanda de Castelnau (fl. second half of 12th century)
- Eleanor Alberga (born 1949)
- Luna Alcalay (1928–2012)
- Amanda Ira Aldridge (1866–1956)
- Vittoria Aleotti (c.1575–after 1620)
- Leni Alexander (1924–2005)
- Liana Alexandra (1947–2011)
- Franghiz Ali-Zadeh (born 1947)
- Charlotte Alington Barnard (1830–1869)
- Esther Allan (1914–1985)
- Kristi Allik (born 1952)
- Frances Allitsen (1849–1912)
- Yardena Alotin (1930–1994)
- Birgitte Alsted (born 1942)
- Martha Alter (1904–1976)
- Lettie Alston (1953–2014)
- Maria de Alvear (born 1960)
- Berta Alves de Sousa (1906–1997)
- Maryanne Amacher (1943–2009)
- Amalie, Princess of Saxony (1794–1870)
- Josephine Amann-Weinlich (1848–1887)
- Solange Ancona (1943–2019)
- Laura Andel (born 1968)
- Gwyneth Van Anden Walker (born 1947)
- Avril Anderson (born 1953)
- Beth Anderson (born 1950)
- Laurie Anderson (born 1947)
- Ruth Anderson (1928–2019)
- Elfrida Andrée (1841–1929)
- Kerry Andrew (born 1978)
- Princess Anna Amalia of Prussia (1723–1787)
- Lucia Contini Anselmi (1876–after 1913)
- Caroline Ansink (born 1959)
- Elizabeth Anspach (1750–1828)
- Yoshino Aoki (born 1971)
- Dina Appeldoorn (1884–1938)
- Adelaide Orsola Appignani (1807–1884)
- Anna Appleby (born 1993)
- Izabella Arazova (born 1936)
- Violet Archer (1913–2000)
- Isabel Aretz (1913–2005)
- Anneli Arho (born 1951)
- Cecilia Arizti (1856–1930)
- Marian Arkwright (1863–1922)
- Elinor Armer (born 1939)
- Lucy Armstrong (born 1991)
- Claude Arrieu (1903–1990)
- Elena Asachi (1789–1877)
- Caterina Assandra (1580–1632)
- Esmeralda Athanasiu-Gardeev (1834–1917)
- Francine Aubin (1938–2016)
- Marianna von Auenbrugger (1759–1782)
- Lera Auerbach (born 1973)
- Josepha Barbara Auernhammer (1758–1820)
- May Aufderheide (1888–1972)
- Valborg Aulin (1860–1928)
- Dorothea Austin (1921–2011)
- Elizabeth R. Austin (born 1938)
- Ana-Maria Avram (born 1961)
- Florence Aylward (1862–1950)
- Azalais de Porcairagues (fl. mid-12th century)
- Svitlana Azarova (born 1976)
- Albena Petrovic-Vratchanska (born 1965)

== B ==
- Heidi Baader-Nobs (born 1940)
- Grażyna Bacewicz (1909–1969)
- Maria Bach (1896–1978)
- Rosa Giacinta Badalla (1660–1710)
- Tekla Bądarzewska-Baranowska (1834–1861)
- Maya Badian (born 1945)
- Vera Baeva (1930–2017)
- Judith Margaret Bailey (1941–2025)
- Regina Harris Baiocchi (born 1956)
- Ruth Bakke (born 1947)
- Laura Wilson Barker (1819–1905)
- P. Bhanumathi (1925–2005)
- Giovanna Bruna Baldacci (1886–after 1910)
- Esther Ballou (1915–1973)
- Puchi Balseiro (1926–2007)
- Bára Gísladóttir (born 1989)
- Barbara of Portugal (1711–1758)
- Mansi Barberis (1899–1986)
- Cacilda Borges Barbosa (1914–2010)
- Elaine Barkin (1932–2023)
- Jasmine Arielle Barnes (born 1991)
- Carol E. Barnett (born 1949)
- Ethel Barns (1874–1948)
- Leonora Baroni (1611–1670)
- Carmen Barradas (1888–1963)
- Elsa Barraine (1910–1999)
- Gisèle Barreau (born 1948)
- Joyce Howard Barrell (1917–1989)
- Françoise Barrière (1944–2019)
- Bebe Barron (1927–2008)
- Cecilia Maria Barthélemon (c. 1769–1840)
- Maria Barthélemon (1749–1799)
- Carin Bartosch Edström (born 1965)
- Adriana Basile (c.1580–c.1640)
- Carola Bauckholt (born 1959)
- Marion Bauer (1882–1955)
- Sophie Bawr (1773–1860)
- Christabel Baxendale (1886–?)
- Marie Emmanuelle Bayon Louis (1746–1825)
- Amy Beach (1867–1944)
- Sally Beamish (born 1956)
- Janet Beat (born 1937)
- Betty Beath (born 1932)
- Beatritz de Dia (fl. late 12th/early 13th centuries)
- Marguerite Béclard d'Harcourt (1884–1964)
- Norma Beecroft (1934–2024)
- Sonja Beets (born 1953)
- Eve Beglarian (born 1958)
- Anđelka Bego-Šimunić (1941–2022)
- Jeanne Behrend (1911–1988)
- Jeanne Beijerman-Walraven (1878–1969)
- Teresa Belloc-Giorgi (1784–1855)
- Antonia Bembo (c. 1640–1720)
- Barbara Benary (1946–2019)
- Chiara Benati (born 1956)
- Josefina Benedetti (born 1953)
- Soledad Bengoecha de Cármena (1849–1893)
- Cathy Berberian (1925–1983)
- Eva Best (1851–1925)
- Charlotte Bray (born 1982)
- Gertrude van den Bergh (1793–1840)
- Christine Berl (born 1943)
- Catalina Berroa (1849–1911)
- Louise Bertin (1805–1877)
- Johanna Beyer (1888–1944)
- Lycia de Biase Bidart (1910–1990)
- Gillian Bibby (1945–2023)
- Marie Bigot (1786–1820)
- Beatriz Bilbao (born 1951)
- Elizabeth Weichsell Billington (c.1768–1818)
- Ethel Edith Bilsland (1892–1982)
- Jocelyne Binet (1923–1968)
- Judith Bingham (born 1952)
- Renate Birnstein (born 1946)
- Roberta Bitgood (1908–2007)
- Annesley Black (born 1979)
- Helen Blackwood (1807–1867)
- Leopoldine Blahetka (1809–1885)
- Blanche of Castile (1188–1252)
- Olga De Blanck Martín (1916–1998)
- Maria Theresa Bland (c.1769–1838)
- Patricia Blomfield Holt (1910–2003)
- Sonia Bo (born 1960)
- Berta Bock (1857–1945)
- Mlle Bocquet (early 17th century–after 1660)
- Sylvie Bodorová (born 1954)
- Josina Anna Petronella van Boetzelaer (1733–1787)
- Ana Bofill Levi (born 1944)
- Caroline Boissier-Butini (1786–1836)
- Michèle Bokanowski (born 1943)
- Jeanne Renee de Bombelles (1753–1828)
- Anna Bon di Venezia (1738–after 1769)
- Carrie Bond (1862–1946)
- Victoria Bond (born 1945)
- Margaret Allison Bonds (1913–1972)
- Andrée Bonhomme (1905–1982)
- Mélanie Bonis (1858–1937)
- Henriette van den Boorn-Coclet (1866–1945)
- Modesta Bor (1926–1998)
- Johanna Bordewijk-Roepman (1892–1971)
- Teresa Borràs i Fornell (1923–2010)
- Edith Borroff (1925–2019)
- Maura Bosch (born 1958)
- Henriëtte Bosmans (1895–1952)
- Marianna Bottini (1802–1858)
- Linda Bouchard (born 1957)
- Lili Boulanger (1893–1918)
- Nadia Boulanger (1887–1979)
- Joséphine Boulay (1869–1925)
- Helen Bowater (born 1952)
- Anne Boyd (born 1946)
- Ina Boyle (1889–1967)
- Anne Louise Boyvin d'Hardancourt Brillon de Jouy (1744–1824)
- May Brahe (1884–1956)
- Gena Branscombe (1881–1977)
- Charlotte Bray (born 1982)
- Josefina Brdlíková (1843–1910)
- Thérèse Brenet (born 1935)
- Bettina Brentano (1785–1859)
- Dora Bright (1862–1951)
- Radie Britain (1899–1994)
- Maria Brizzi Giorgi (1775–1822)
- Maria Broel-Plater (1845-1895)
- Roslyn Brogue (1919–1981)
- Ingeborg von Bronsart (1840–1913)
- Augusta Browne (1820–1882)
- Harriet Browne (1790–1858)
- Elisabetta Brusa (born 1954)
- Joanna Bruzdowicz (1943–2021)
- Filipina Brzezinska-Szymanowska (1800–1886)
- Dorothy Quita Buchanan (born 1945)
- Olivia Buckley (mid-1790s–after 1845)
- Margaret Buechner (1922–1998)
- Nini Bulterijs (1929–1989)
- Diana Burrell (born 1948)
- Canary Lee Burton (born 1942)

== C ==
- Francesca Caccini (1587–1640?)
- Settimia Caccini (1591–1638?)
- Geneviève Calame (1946–1993)
- Rosalie Balmer Smith Cale (1875–1958)
- Ann Callaway (born 1949)
- Maria Cattarina Calegari (1644–1675)
- Eugenia Calosso (1878–1914)
- Amice Calverley (1896–1959)
- Francesca Campana (died 1665)
- Virginia Mariani Campolieti (1869–1941)
- Marguerite Canal (1890–1978)
- Marta Canales (1893–1986)
- Édith Canat de Chizy (born 1950)
- Julie Candeille (1767–1834)
- Constança Capdeville (1937–1992)
- Valerie Capers (born 1935)
- Matilde Capuis (1913–2017)
- Nicole Carignan (born 1952)
- Célanie Carissan (1843–1927)
- Wendy Carlos (born 1939)
- Mary Grant Carmichael (1851–1935)
- Ann Carr-Boyd (born 1938)
- Teresa Carreño (1853–1917)
- Dinorá de Carvalho (1905–1980)
- Doreen Carwithen (1922–2003)
- Ernestina Lecuona y Casado (1882–1951)
- Luisa Casagemas (1863 – after 1894)
- Felicita Casella (c.1820 – after 1865)
- Lola Castegnaro (1900–1979)
- Castelloza (fl. early 13th century)
- Graciela Castillo (born 1940)
- Zosha Di Castri (born 1985)
- Eve de Castro-Robinson (born 1956)
- Maddalena Casulana (c.1540 – c.1590)
- Amalia Catharina (1640–1697)
- Eunice Catunda (1915–1991)
- Gabriella Cecchi (born 1944)
- Monic Cecconi-Botella (1936–2025)
- Julia Cenova (1948–2010)
- Sulpitia Cesis (fl. 1619)
- Grace Chadbourne (1870–1919)
- Wendy Mae Chambers (born 1953)
- Cécile Chaminade (1857–1944)
- Nancy Laird Chance (born 1931)
- Janine Charbonnier (1926–2022)
- Isabelle de Charrière (1740–1805)
- Gayane Chebotarian (1918–1998)
- Maria Chefaliady-Taban (1863–1932)
- Yekaterina Chemberdzhi (born 1960)
- Unsuk Chin (born 1961)
- Geghuni Hovannesi Chitchian (born 1929)
- Hedwige Chrétien (1859–1944)
- Pearle Christian (born 1955)
- Tatyana Chudova (1944–2021)
- Suzanne Ciani (born 1946)
- Catherina Cibbini-Kozeluch (1785–1858)
- Maya Ciobanu (born 1952)
- Dolores Claman (1927–2021)
- Rhona Clarke (born 1958)
- Laura Clayton (born 1943)
- Ann Cleare (born 1983)
- Siobhán Cleary (born 1970)
- Marie-Elizabeth Cléry (1761–after 1795)
- Judith Ann Clingan (born 1945)
- Adrienne Clostre (1921–2006)
- Gloria Coates (1938–2023)
- Maria Rosa Coccia (1759–1833)
- Rhoda Coghill (1903–2000)
- Isabella Colbran (1785–1845)
- Ulric Cole (1905–1992)
- Ellen Coleman (1886–1973)
- Valerie Coleman (born 1970)
- Avril Coleridge-Taylor (1903–1998)
- Jeanne Colin-De Clerck (born 1924)
- Theodora Cormontan (1840–1922)
- Graziella Concas (born 1970)
- Sylvia Constantinidis (born 1962)
- Peggy Stuart Coolidge (1913–1981)
- Eleanor Cory (born 1943)
- Monica Cosachov (born 1946)
- Micheline Coulombe Saint-Marcoux (1938–1985)
- Jean Coulthard (1908–2000)
- Mildred Couper (1887–1974)
- Cecil Cowles (c.1893 – 1968)
- Ellen C. Covito (born 1974)
- Chiara Margarita Cozzolani (1602–1678)
- Anna Cramer (1873–1968)
- Guirne Creith (1907–1996)
- Zulema de la Cruz (born 1958)
- Chaya Czernowin (born 1957)

== D ==
- Melanie Ruth Daiken (1945–2016)
- Nancy Dalberg (1881–1949)
- Eleanor Joanne Daley (born 1955)
- Dame Margot (fl. 13th century)
- Dame Maroie (fl. 13th century)
- Cecilia Damström (born 1988)
- Margarethe Danzi (1768–1800)
- Marie Dare (1902–1976)
- Tina Davidson (born 1952)
- Hilda Emery Davis (1895–1995)
- Eiluned Davies (1913–1999)
- Tansy Davies (born 1973)
- Katherine K. Davis (1892–1980)
- Miss Davis (c.1726 – after 1755)
- Mme Delaval (fl. 1791–1802)
- Claire Delbos (1906–1959)
- Carmelina Delfin (c. 1900 – after 1948)
- Eva Dell'Acqua (1856–1930)
- Sophia Dellaporta (fl. second half of the 19th century)
- Hélène-Louise Demars (c. 1736–1778)
- Jeanne Demessieux (1921–1968)
- Beth Denisch (born 1958)
- Delia Derbyshire (1937–2001)
- Lady Mary Dering (1629–1704)
- Marcelle Deschênes (born 1939)
- Yvonne Desportes (1907–1993)
- Alma Deutscher (born 2005)
- Jeanne-Hippolyte Devismes (1765–?1834)
- Jody Diamond (born 1953)
- Hilda Dianda (1925–2014)
- Ellen Dickson (1819–1878)
- Emma Lou Diemer (1927–2024)
- Consuelo Díez (born 1958)
- Fannie Charles Dillon (1881–1974)
- Violeta Dinescu (born 1953)
- Lucia Dlugoszewski (1931–2000)
- Felicia Donceanu (1931–2022)
- Dora Draganova (born 1946)
- Madeleine Dring (1923–1977)
- Annette von Droste-Hülshoff (1797–1848)
- Du Yun (born 1977)
- Leonora Duarte (1610–1678)
- María Enma Botet Dubois (1903–?)
- Shirley Graham Du Bois (1896–1977)
- Pauline Duchambge (1778–1858)
- Sophie Elisabeth, Duchess of Brunswick-Lüneburg (1613–1676)
- Anna Amalia, Duchess of Saxe-Weimar-Eisenach (1739–1807)
- Anne Dudley (born 1956)
- Katerina Veronika Anna Dusíkova (1769–1833)
- Sophia Corri Dussek (1775–1847)
- Mlle Duval (1718–after 1775)
- Judith Dvorkin (1928–1995)
- Lesya Dychko (born 1939)
- Maria Dziewulska (1909–2006)

== E ==
- Sophie-Carmen Eckhardt-Gramatté (1901–1974)
- Lotten Edholm (1839–1930)
- Clara Edwards (1880–1974)
- Fredrikke Egeberg (1815–1861)
- Lilian Elkington (1900–1969)
- Katharine Emily Eggar (1874–1961)
- Margriet Ehlen (born 1943)
- Adelheid Maria Eichner (1762–1787)
- Maija Einfelde (born 1939)
- Karólína Eiríksdóttir (born 1951)
- Tanya Ekanayaka (born 1977)
- Michelle Ekizian (born 1956)
- Eleonora Eksanishvili (1919–2003)
- Irina Elcheva (1926–2013)
- Rosalind Frances Ellicott (1857–1924)
- Dilys Elwyn-Edwards (1918–2012)
- Kateřina Emingerová (1856–1934)
- Marti Epstein (born 1959)
- Susanne Erding-Swiridoff (born 1955)
- Siegrid Ernst (1929–2022)
- Pozzi Escot (born 1933)
- María Escribano (1954–2002)
- Reena Esmail (born 1983)
- Margaret Essex (1775–1807)
- Eleonora d'Este (1515–1575)
- Matilee Loeb Evans (1879-1963)
- Florence Maude Ewart (1864-1949)

== F ==
- Clara Mathilda Faisst (1872–1948)
- Rolande Falcinelli (1920–2006)
- Evelyn Faltis (1887–1937)
- Eibhlis Farrell (born 1953)
- Louise Farrenc (1804–1875)
- Zanetta Farussi (1707–1776)
- Magdeleine Boucherit Le Faure (1879–1960)
- Hélène-Frédérique de Faye-Jozin (1871–1942)
- Sarah Feigin (1928–2011)
- Josima Feldschuh (1929–1943)
- Johanne Amalie Fenger (1836–1913)
- Amber Ferenz (born 1972)
- Phyllis Fergus (1887-1964)
- Maria Helena Rosas Fernandes (born 1933)
- Carlotta Ferrari (1837–1907)
- Gabrielle Ferrari (1851–1921)
- Beatriz Ferreyra (born 1937)
- Sylvia Fine (1913–1991)
- Vivian Fine (1913–2000)
- Mary Finsterer (born 1962)
- Graciane Finzi (born 1945)
- Elena Firsova (born 1950)
- Helen Fisher (born 1942)
- Tsippi Fleischer (born 1946)
- Hélène Fleury-Roy (1876–1957)
- Eliza Flower (1803–1846)
- Eugénie-Emilie Juliette Folville (1870–1946)
- Jacqueline Fontyn (born 1930)
- Annie Fortescue Harrison (1851–1944)
- Jennifer Fowler (born 1939)
- Erika Fox (born 1936)
- Kalitha Dorothy Fox (1894–1934)
- Ludmila Frajt (1919–1999)
- Dorothea Anne Franchi (1920–2003)
- Cheryl Frances-Hoad (born 1980)
- Hedy Frank-Autheried (1902–1979)
- Gisela Frankl (1860–1935)
- Joan Franks Williams (1930–2003)
- Shena Fraser (1910–1993)
- Isadore Freed (1900–1960)
- Eleanor Everest Freer (1864–1942)
- Narcisa Freixas (1859–1926)
- Ilse Fromm-Michaels (1888–1986)
- Susan Frykberg (1954–2023)
- Lillian Fuchs (1901–1995)
- Irène Fuerison (1875–1931)
- Keiko Fujiie (born 1963)
- Ellen Fullman (born 1957)
- Ashley Fure (born 1982)
- Biancamaria Furgeri (born 1935)
- Jessie Furze (1903–1984)

== G ==
- Virginia Gabriel (1825–1877)
- Sophie Gail (1775–1819)
- Diamanda Galás (born 1955)
- Margherita Galeotti (1867–after 1912)
- Rachel Galinne (born 1949)
- Caterina Galli (c.1723–1804)
- Elisabetta de Gambarini (1731–1765)
- Kay Gardner (1941–2002)
- Garsenda de Proensa (fl. early 13th century)
- Lucija Garuta (1902–1977)
- Marianne Gary-Schaffhauser (1903–1992)
- Koharik Gazarossian (1907–1967)
- Roberta Geddes-Harvey (1849–1930)
- Gerda Geertens (born 1955)
- Gertrude of Dagsburg (1205–1225)
- Ada Gentile (born 1947)
- Abbie Gerrish-Jones (1863–1929)
- Miriam Gideon (1906–1996)
- Brenda Gifford (born 1968)
- Helen Gifford (born 1935)
- Ruth Gipps (1921–1999)
- Suzanne Giraud (born 1958)
- Julie Giroux (born 1961)
- Janice Giteck (born 1946)
- Barbara Giuranna (1898–1998)
- Teodora Ginés (1530–1598)
- Jacobine Gjertz (1819–1862)
- Peggy Glanville-Hicks (1912–1990)
- Helen Glatz (1908–1996)
- Evelyn Glennie (born 1965)
- Julia Gomelskaya (1964–2016)
- Chiquinha Gonzaga (1847–1935)
- Florence Everilda Goodeve (1861–1915)
- Annette Vande Gorne (born 1946)
- Annie Gosfield (born 1960)
- Ida Gotkovsky (1933–2025)
- Luise Adelgunda Gottsched (1713–1762)
- Dorothy Gow (1893–1982)
- Janet Graham (born 1948)
- Shirley Graham Du Bois (1896–1977)
- Clémence de Grandval (1828–1907)
- Caterina Benedicta Grazianini (fl. early 18th century)
- Gisella Delle Grazie (born 1868, fl. 1894–95)
- Kyla Greenbaum (1922–2017)
- Lucile Grétry (1772–1790)
- María Grever (1885–1951)
- Deirdre Gribbin (born 1967)
- Beverly Grigsby (1928–2022)
- Maria Margherita Grimani (fl. early 18th century)
- Annie Maria Grimson (1870–1949)
- Agathe Backer Grøndahl (1847–1907)
- Aleksandra Gryka (born 1977)
- Sofia Gubaidulina (1931–2025)
- Emilia Gubitosi (1887–1972)
- Mlle Guédon de Presles (early 18th century–1754)
- Isabel Güell i López (1872–1956)
- Mlle Guerin (c.1739, fl. 1755)
- Jane Mary Guest (1762–1846)
- Lynn Gumert (born 1961)
- Rosa Guraieb (1931–2014)
- Nazife Güran (1921–1993)
- Elizabeth Gyring (1886–1970)

== H ==
- Louise Haenel de Cronenthall (1839–c.1876)
- Hafdís Bjarnadóttir (born 1977)
- Helen Eugenia Hagan (1893–1964)
- Elizabeth Joanetta Catherine von Hagen (1750–1809/10)
- Júlia Hajdú (1915–1987)
- Emily Hall (born 1978)
- Juliana Hall (born 1958)
- Pauline Hall (1890–1969)
- Emilie Hammarskjöld (1821–1854)
- Ann-Elise Hannikainen (1946–2012)
- Olga Hans (born 1971)
- Kazuko Hara (1935–2014)
- Guy d'Hardelot (1858–1936)
- Halina Harelava (born 1951)
- Miina Härma (1864–1941)
- Ethel R. Harraden (1857–1917)
- Edith Mary Harrhy (1893–1969)
- Regina Harris Baiocchi (born 1956)
- Pamela Harrison (1915–1990)
- Susie Frances Harrison (1859–1935)
- Emma Hartmann (1807–1851)
- Cécile Hartog (1857–1940)
- Irina Hasnas (born 1954)
- Faustina Hasse Hodges (1822–1895)
- Elisabeth de Haulteterre (fl. 1737–1768)
- Birgit Havenstein (born 1954)
- Hanna Havrylets' (1958–2022)
- Elizabeth Hayden Pizer (born 1954)
- Sorrel Hays (1941–2020)
- Åse Hedstrøm (born 1950)
- Rebecca Helferich Clarke (1886–1979)
- Barbara Heller (born 1936)
- Mara Margaret Helmuth (born 1957)
- Moya Henderson (born 1941)
- Fanny Hensel (1805–1847)
- Louise Héritte-Viardot (1841–1918)
- Gisela Hernández (1912–1971)
- Teresa Tanco Cordovez de Herrera (1859–1946)
- Ethel Glenn Hier (1889–1971)
- Jennifer Higdon (born 1962)
- Hildegard of Bingen (1098–1179)
- Daisy Wood Hildreth (1879–1969)
- Mirrie Hill (1892–1986)
- Dorothy Hindman (born 1966)
- Rozalie Hirs (born 1965)
- Marija Hladnik Berden (1892–1924)
- Margaret Hoberg (1890–1948)
- Margriet Hoenderdos (1952–2010)
- Dulcie Holland (1913–2000)
- Augusta Holmès (1847–1903)
- Borghild Holmsen (1865–1938)
- Imogen Holst (1907–1984)
- Adriana Hölszky (born 1953)
- Nora Holt (1884–1974)
- Helen Francis Hood (1863–1949)
- Katherine Hoover (1937–2018)
- Helen Hopekirk (1856–1945)
- Amy Elsie Horrocks (1867–after 1915)
- Cevanne Horrocks-Hopayian
- Eleanor Hovda (1940–2009)
- Mary Howe (1882–1964)
- Dorothy Howell (1898–1982)
- Zhun Huang (1926–2024)
- Elaine Hugh-Jones (1927–2021)
- Fanny Hünerwadel (1826–1854)
- Sarah Hutchings (born 1984)
- Brenda Hutchinson (born 1954)
- Miriam Beatrice Hyde (1913–2005)

== I ==
- Regina Irman (born 1957)
- Madeleine Isaksson (born 1956)
- Jean Eichelberger Ivey (1923–2010)
- Adina Izarra (born 1959)

== J ==
- Najla Jabor (1915–2001)
- Jaddanbai
- Marie Jaëll (1846–1925)
- Dorothy James (1901–1982)
- Viera Janárceková (1941–2023)
- Natalia Janotha (1856–1932)
- Kerstin Jeppsson (born 1948)
- Hilda Jerea (1919–1980)
- Ludmila Jeske-Choinska-Mikorska (1849–1898)
- Eva Jessye (1885–1992)
- Marta Jiráčková (born 1932)
- Betsy Jolas (born 1926)
- Victoria Jordanova (born 1952)
- Jane M. Joseph (1894–1929)
- Patricia Jünger (1951–2017)
- Elsa Justel (born 1944)

== K ==
- Clotilde Kainerstorfer (fl. second half 19th century)
- Yuki Kajiura (born 1965)
- Lydia Kakabadse (born 1955)
- Trisutji Kamal (1936–2021)
- Laura Kaminsky (born 1956)
- Kikuko Kanai (1911–1986)
- Yoko Kanno (born 1964)
- Kanika Kapoor (born 1978)
- Vítězslava Kaprálová (1915–1940)
- Sirvart Karamanuk (1912–2008)
- Helene Karastoyanova (born 1933)
- Gregoria Karides Suchy (1923-2018)
- Verdi Karns (1882–1925)
- Lyudmila Karpawna Shleh (born 1948)
- Laura Karpman (born 1959)
- Leokadiya Kashperova (1872–1940)
- Shibani Kashyap (born 1982)
- Lucrecia Roces Kasilag (1918–2008)
- Kassia (c. 810 – before 867)
- Elena Kats-Chernin (born 1957)
- Eunice Katunda (1915–1991)
- Hiba Kawas (born 1972)
- Minna Keal (1909–1999)
- Denise Kelly (born 1954)
- Le Sénéchal de Kerkado (c. 1786 – after 1805)
- Frida Kern (1891–1988)
- Minuetta Kessler (1914–2002)
- Eunice Lea Kettering (1906–2000)
- Usha Khanna (born 1941)
- Sneha Khanwalkar (born 1983)
- Khosrovidukht (fl. early 8th century)
- Joelle Khoury (born 1963)
- Hi Kyung Kim (born 1954)
- Betty Jackson King (1928–1994)
- Johanna Kinkel (1810–1858)
- Makiko Kinoshita (born 1956)
- Antoinette Kirkwood (1930–2014)
- Melinda Kistétényi (1926–1999)
- Yayoi Kitazume (born 1945)
- Anna Maria Klechniowska (1888–1973)
- Judy Klein (born 1943)
- Meri von KleinSmid (born 1974)
- Zhivka Klinkova (1924–2002)
- Mary Knight Wood (1857–1944)
- Wilhelmina Koch (1845–1924)
- Barbara Kolb (1938–2024)
- Nagako Konishi (born 1945)
- Yelena Sergeyevna Konshina (born 1950)
- Yüksel Koptagel (born 1931)
- Clara Anna Korn (1866–1941)
- Dina Koston (1940–2009)
- Georgia Koumará (born 1991)
- Mathilde Kralik von Mayerswalden (1857–1944)
- Neva Krasteva (born 1946)
- Astrid Kruisselbrink (born 1972)
- Anne-Marie Krumpholtz (1766–1813)
- Grazyna Krzanowska (born 1952)
- Halina Krzyzanowska (1860–1937)
- Christina Kubisch (born 1948)
- Mayako Kubo (born 1947)
- Felicitas Kukuck (1914–2001)
- Hanna Kulenty (born 1961)
- Izabella Kuliffay (1863–1945)
- Renata Kunkel (born 1954)
- Elisabeth Kuyper (1877–1953)
- Iryna Kyrylina (1953–2017)

== L ==
- Joan La Barbara (born 1947)
- Zulema de la Cruz (born 1958)
- Élisabeth Jacquet de La Guerre (1665–1729)
- Nicole Lachartre (1934–1992)
- Susan Cohn Lackman (born 1948)
- Fanny E. Lacy (fl. 1832–1859)
- Anne Terrier Laffaille (1904–1971)
- Lila Lalauni (1910–1996)
- Bun-Ching Lam (born 1954)
- Marta Lambertini (1937–2019)
- Eleni Lambiri (c.1889–1960)
- Kay Lande (1930–2022)
- Wanda Landowska (1879–1959)
- Josephine Lang (1815–1880)
- Margaret Ruthven Lang (1867–1972)
- Vanessa Lann (born 1968)
- Ana Lara (born 1959)
- Libby Larsen (born 1950)
- Hannah Lash (born 1981)
- Joan Mary Last (1908–2002)
- Anne Lauber (born 1943)
- Elodie Lauten (1950–2014)
- Luise Adolpha Le Beau (1850–1927)
- Louise Geneviève de La Hye (1810–1838)
- Constance Faunt Le Roy Runcie (1836–1911)
- Anne LeBaron (born 1953)
- Francesca Lebrun (1756–1791)
- Sophie Lebrun (1781–1863)
- Cynthia Cozette Lee (born 1953)
- Chan-Hae Lee (born 1945)
- Young-ja Lee (composer) (born 1931)
- Nicola LeFanu (born 1947)
- Dragica Legat Košmerl (1883–1956)
- Ethel Leginska (1886–1970)
- Liza Lehmann (1862–1918)
- Clarisse Leite (1917–2003)
- Vânia Dantas Leite (1945–2018)
- Helvi Leiviskä (1902–1982)
- Édith Lejet (1941–2024)
- Jeanne Leleu (1898–1979)
- Laura Lemon (1866–1924)
- Tania León (born 1943)
- Isabella Leonarda (1620–1704)
- Marina Leonardi (born 1970)
- Zara Levina (1906–1976)
- Sofia Levkovskaya (1965–2011)
- Dee Libbey (1919–1988)
- Helene Liebmann (1796–1835)
- Nanna Magdalene Liebmann (1849–1935)
- Ekaterina Likoshin (fl. 1800–1810)
- Elainie Lillios (born 1968)
- Lili'uokalani (1838–1917)
- Liza Lim (born 1966)
- Asunta Limpias de Parada (1915–1995)
- Maria Lindsay (1827–1898)
- Grace Walls Linn (1874–1940)
- Anne Linnet (born 1953)
- Mary Linwood (1755/6–1845)
- Liu Zhuang (1932–2011)
- Beatriz Lockhart (1944–2015)
- Annea Lockwood (born 1939)
- Kate Loder (1825–1904)
- Emma Lomax (1873–1963)
- Ruth Lomon (1930–2017)
- Celeste de Longpré Heckscher (1860–1928)
- Lorete (c.1300)
- Elza Löthner-Rahmn (1872-1933)
- Silvana Di Lotti (born 1942)
- Ivana Loudová (1941–2017)
- Alexina Louie (born 1949)
- Mary Lucas (1882–1952)
- Katharine Lucke (1875–1962)
- Nada Ludvig-Pecar (1929–2008)
- Maria Teresa Luengo (born 1940)
- Enid Luff (1935–2022)
- Gudrun Lund (1930–2020)
- Signe Lund (1868–1950)
- Deborah Lurie (born 1972)
- Elisabeth Lutyens (1906–1983)
- Lyudmila Lyadova (1925–2021)
- Monica Lynn (born 1964)

== M ==
- Emma Maria Macfarren (1824–1895)
- Marianella Machado (born 1959)
- Clara Angela Macirone (1821–1895)
- Carmela Mackenna (1879–1962)
- Elizabeth Maconchy (1907–1994)
- Adela Maddison (1862/63–1929)
- Mary Mageau (1934–2020)
- Ester Mägi (1922–2021)
- Alma Mahler (1879–1964)
- Katerina Maier (fl. c.1800)
- Baronne Almaury de Maistre (1809–1875)
- Maria Malibran (1808–1836)
- Florentina Mallá (1891–1973)
- Carin Malmlöf-Forssling (1916–2005)
- Maria Dolores Malumbres (1931–2019)
- Ursula Mamlok (1923–2016)
- Lata Mangeshkar (1929–2022)
- Meena Mangeshkar (born 1931)
- Kathleen Lockhart Manning (1890–1951)
- Lam Manyee (born 1950)
- Marcelle de Manziarly (1899–1989)
- Soe Tjen Marching (born 1971)
- Myriam Marbe (1931–1997)
- Rosanna Scalfi Marcello (fl. 1723–1742)
- Bunita Marcus (born 1952)
- Tera de Marez Oyens (1932–1996)
- Maria de Raschenau (fl. 1690s–1703)
- Maria de Ventadorn (fl. late 12th century)
- Maria Luisa, Duchess of Lucca (1782–1824)
- Ljubica Maric (1909–2003)
- Marie de France (c.1160–1215)
- Maroie de Dregnau de Lille (fl. 13th century)
- Manuela Antonia Márquez García-Saavedra (1844–1890)
- Florence Ashton Marshall (1843–after 1911)
- Pamela J. Marshall (born 1954)
- Roberta Martin (1907–1969)
- Marianna von Martines (1744–1812)
- Odaline de la Martinez (born 1949)
- Maria de Lourdes Martins (1926–2009)
- Paola Massarenghi (fl. 1565–1585)
- Elizabeth Masson (1806–1865)
- Kikuko Masumoto (born 1937)
- Celeste Jaguaribe de Matos Faria (1873–1938)
- Maria Matos Priolli (1915-2000)
- Bernadetta Matuszczak (1937–2021)
- Emilie Mayer (1812–1883)
- Marilyn Mazur (1955–2025)
- Mona McBurney (1862–1932)
- Cecilia McDowall (born 1951)
- Susan McFarland Parkhurst (1836–1918)
- Diana McIntosh (1937–2022)
- Amy Upham Thomson McKean (1893–1972)
- Priscilla McLean (born 1942)
- Jenny Helen McLeod (1941–2022)
- Lena McLin (1928–2023)
- Cindy McTee (born 1953)
- Joyce Mekeel (1931–1997)
- Sophie Menter (1846–1918)
- María de las Mercedes Adam de Aróstegui (1873–1957)
- Zhanneta Lazarevna Metallidi (1934–2019)
- Elisabeth Meyer (1859–1927)
- Teresa Milanollo (1827–1904)
- Silvina Milstein (born 1956)
- Zarrina Mirshakar (born 1947)
- Haruna Miyake (born 1942)
- Ida Moberg (1859–1947)
- Benna Moe (1897–1983)
- Meredith Monk (born 1942)
- Helene de Montgeroult (1764–1836)
- Jessie Montgomery (born 1982)
- Dorothy Rudd Moore (1940–2022)
- Kate Moore (born 1979)
- Mary Carr Moore (1873–1957)
- Undine Smith Moore (1904–1989)
- Charlotte Moorman (1933–1991)
- Joyce Solomon Moorman (born 1946)
- Vincenza Garelli della Morea (1859–after 1924)
- Virginie Morel-du Verger (1799–1869)
- Nelly Moretto (1925–1978)
- Junko Mori (born 1948)
- Angela Morley (1924–2009)
- Jocelyn Morlock (1969–2023)
- Susan Morton Blaustein (born 1953)
- Gladys Smuckler Moskowitz (1928–2024)
- Nadežka Mosusova (born 1928)
- Krystyna Moszumanska-Nazar (1924–2009)
- Ann Mounsey (1811–1891)
- Gabriela Moyseowicz (born 1944)
- Milena Mrazović (1863–1927)
- Geraldine Mucha (1917–2012)
- Johanna Müller-Hermann (1878–1941)
- Gráinne Mulvey (born 1966)
- Isabel Mundry (born 1963)
- Helena Munktell (1852–1919)
- Catherine Murphy Urner (1891–1942)
- Thea Musgrave (born 1928)

== N ==
- Maria Francesca Nascinbeni (c. 1640–1680)
- Laura Netzel (1839–1927)
- Alicia Adélaide Needham (1863–1945)
- Angélica Negrón (born 1981)
- Sheila Nelson (1936–2020)
- Sarah Nemtsov (born 1980)
- Susanna Nerantzi (fl. 1830–1840)
- Vojna Nešic (born 1947)
- Laura Constance Netzel (1839–1927)
- Olga Neuwirth (born 1968)
- Dika Newlin (1923–2006)
- Ailís Ní Ríain (born 1974)
- Alberta Nichols (1898–1957)
- Julia Niewiarowska-Brzozowska (1827–1891)
- Tatyana Nikolayeva (1924–1993)
- Mary Rosselli Nissim (1864–1937)
- Eva Noer Kondrup (born 1964)
- Ilza Nogueira (born 1948)
- Gladys Nordenstrom (1924–2016)
- Isabel Stewart North (1860–1929)
- Caroline Elizabeth Sarah Norton (1808–1877)
- Jacqueline Nova (1935–1975)
- Maude Nugent (1873/4–1958)
- Farangis Nurulla-Khoja (born 1972)

== O ==
- Karola Obermueller (born 1977)
- Jana Obrovská (1930–1987)
- Irina Odagescu (born 1937)
- Sook-Ja Oh (born 1941)
- Nkeiru Okoye (born 1972)
- Marguerite Olagnier (1844–1906)
- Jane O'Leary (born 1946)
- Elisabeth Olin (1740–1828)
- Vivienne Olive (born 1950)
- Jocy de Oliveira (born 1936)
- Betty Olivero (born 1954)
- Pauline Oliveros (1932–2016)
- María Teresa Oller (1920–2018)
- Cornélie van Oosterzee (1863–1943)
- Daphne Oram (1925–2003)
- Anne-Marie Ørbeck (1911–1996)
- Cecilie Ore (born 1954)
- Caroline Orger (1818–1892)
- Gabriela Ortiz (born 1964)
- Michiru Oshima (born 1961)
- Reine Colaço Osorio-Swaab (1881–1971)
- Linda Woodaman Ostrander (born 1937)
- Ai Otsuka (born 1982)
- Anna Caroline Oury (1808–1880)
- Halyna Ovcharenko (born 1963)
- Morfydd Llwyn Owen (1891–1918)
- Janet Owen Thomas (1961–2002)
- Terry Winter Owens (1941–2007)
- María Luisa Ozaita (1939–2017)

== P ==
- Albena Petrovic-Vratchanska (born 1965)
- Else Marie Pade (1924–2016)
- Younghi Pagh-Paan (born 1945)
- Priti Paintal (born 1960)
- Aleksandra Pakhmutova (born 1929)
- Florence Margaret Spencer Palmer (1900–1987)
- Juliet Palmer (born 1969)
- Roxanna Panufnik (born 1968)
- Mme Papavoine (born c.1735, fl. 1755–61)
- Maria Theresa von Paradis (1759–1824)
- Graciela Paraskevaidis (1940–2017)
- Hilda Paredes (born 1959)
- Maria Hester Park (1760–1813)
- Dorothy Parke (1904–1990)
- Maria Frances Parke (1772–1822)
- Alice Parker (1925–2023)
- Annie Patterson (1868–1934)
- Marcela Pavia (born 1957)
- Alla Pavlova (born 1952)
- Maggi Payne (born 1945)
- Sarah Peebles (born 1964)
- Sylvia Pengilly (born 1935)
- Dora Pejacevic (1885–1923)
- Maria Teresa Pelegrí i Marimón (1907–1995)
- Barbara Pentland (1912–2000)
- Diana Pereira Hay (born 1932)
- Nydia Pereyra-Lizaso (1916–1998)
- Lourdes Perez (born 1961)
- Helen Perkin (1909–1996)
- Anaïs Perrière-Pilte (1836–1878)
- Janice Kapp Perry (born 1938)
- Julia Perry (1924–1979)
- Zenobia Powell Perry (1908–2004)
- Anna Pessiak-Schmerling (1834–1896)
- Rosica Petkova (born 1947)
- Carmen Petra Basacopol (1926–2023)
- Mara Petrova (1921–1997)
- Elena Petrová (1929–2002)
- Irena Pfeiffer (1912–1996)
- Mrs Philarmonica (fl. 1715)
- Liz Phillips (born 1951)
- Elizabeth Philp (1827–1885)
- Maria Antonietta Picconi (1869–1926)
- Marie de Pierpont (1844-1896)
- Agata Della Pietà (fl. c.1800)
- Michielina Della Pietà (fl. c. 1701–1744)
- Santa Della Pietà (fl. c.1725–1750 – after 1774)
- Edna Frida Pietsch (1894-1982)
- Audrey Piggott (1906-2001)
- Eleanor Franklin Pike (1890-c. 1973)
- Heda Piliš (1925-2015)
- Julie Pinel (fl. 1710–1737)
- Lina Pires de Campos (1918–2003)
- Hilda Pires dos Reis (1919–2001)
- Piera Pistono (born 1938)
- Emma Pitt (1846-1919)
- Fanny Krumpholtz Pittar (1785–1815)
- Alice Locke Pittman (1868-1936)
- Agathe Plitt (1831-1902)
- Zhanna Vasil'yevna Pliyeva (1948–2023)
- Mary Plumstead (1905-1980)
- Barbara Pointon (1939-2020)
- Poldowski (1879–1932)
- Victoria Poleva (born 1962)
- Armande de Polignac (1876–1962)
- Claire Polin (1926–1995)
- Marie Nicole Simonin Pollet (1787-1864)
- Maria Luisa Ponsa (1875-1919)
- Vincenta Da Ponte (fl. second half 18th century)
- Jeannie G. Pool (born 1951)
- Anna Ware Poole (1838-1929)
- Marie Pooler (1928-2013)
- Tamara Popatenko (1912-1991)
- Elise Popovici (1921-2011)
- Rachel Portman (born 1960)
- Elizabeth Poston (1905–1987)
- Alba Lucía Potes Cortés (born 1954)
- Rosephanye Powell (born 20th century)
- Ada Weigel Powers (1863-1947)
- Mary Ann Pownall (1751–1796)
- Lila Pradell (1932-2024)
- Natalia Pravosudovich (1899-1988)
- Vera Nicolaevna Preobrajenska (1926-2011)
- Oliveria Louisa Prescott (1843–1919)
- Beryl Price (born 1912)
- Florence Beatrice Price (1887–1953)
- Dorothy Priesing (1910-1999)
- María Teresa Prieto (1896–1982)
- Deborah Pritchard (born 1977)
- Marieta Morosina Priuli (fl. 1665)
- Teresa Procaccini (born 1934)
- Friederike Proch Benesch (1805–1872)
- Alice McElroy Procter (1915-1987)
- Marie Proksch (1836–1900)
- Grażyna Pstrokońska-Nawratil (born 1947)
- Marta Ptaszynska (born 1943)
- Loïsa Puget (1810–1889)
- Hilary Purrington (born 1990)
- Fanny Puzzi (1834-1913)
- Helen Pyke (1905–1954)

== Q ==
- Hildegard Quiel (1888-1971)
- Anne Quigley (born 1955 or 1956)
- Marie-Anne-Catherine Quinault (1695–1791)
- Lucia Quinciani (born c. 1566, fl. 1611)
- Agnes Clune Quinlan (1873-1949)

== R ==
- Florica Racovitză-Flondor (1897-1983)
- Olga Radecki (1858-1933)
- Erika Radermacher (born 1936)
- Eliane Radigue (born 1932)
- Helen Radnor (1846-1929)
- Natalia Raigorodsky (1929-2018)
- Priaulx Rainier (1903–1986)
- Miriam Rakhmankulova (1901–1990)
- Kate Ralph (1849-1937)
- Frances Marion Ralston (1875–1952)
- Valentina Ramm (1888–1968)
- Teresa Rampazzi (1914–2001)
- Shulamit Ran (born 1949)
- Eda Rapoport (1890–1968)
- Elizabeth Raum (born 1945)
- Irma Ravinale (1937–2013)
- Mme Ravissa (fl. late 18th century)
- Angèle Ravizé (1887–1980)
- Florence P. Rea (1878–1924)
- Louise Christine Rebe (1900–1978)
- Giulia Recli (1890–1970)
- Marlyce Polk Reed (born 1955)
- Clara Rees (1859–?)
- Winifred Emily Rees (1900–1976)
- Karin Rehnqvist (born 1957)
- Juliane Reichardt (1752–1783)
- Louise Reichardt (1779–1826)
- Sally Johnston Reid (1948–2019)
- Lily Reiff (1866–1958))
- Caroline Reinagle (1818–1892)
- Lauma Reinholde (1906–1986)
- Andrea Reinkemeyer (born 1976)
- Violet Reiser (1905–1981)
- Julie Reisserová (1888–1938)
- Bertha Remick (1872–1965)
- Claire Renard (born 1944)
- Augustine Renaud d`Allen (1789–after 1821)
- Anna Renfer (1896–1984)
- Henriette Renié (1875–1956)
- Catherine Rennes (1858–1940)
- Rosette Renshaw (1920–1997)
- Elsa Respighi (1894–1996)
- Michèle Reverdy (born 1943)
- Sylvia Rexach (1922–1961)
- Marisa Rezende (born 1944)
- Lois Rhea (1916–2004)
- Helen Rhodes (1858–1936)
- Cesarina Ricci de Tingoli (born c.1573, fl. 1597)
- Gladys Rich (1892–1972)
- Kathleen Richards (1895–1984)
- Jeannine Richer (1924–2022)
- Caroline Richings (1832–1882)
- Marga Richter (1926–2020)
- Marion Morrey Richter (1900–1996)
- Sylvia Rickard (born 1937)
- Onestina Ricotti (19th century)
- Teresa Clotilde del Riego (1876–1968)
- Nadezhda Rimskaya-Korsakova (1848–1919)
- Marilyn Rinehart (1926–2012)
- Mathilde Ringelsberg (1813–1877)
- Diana Ringo (born 1992)
- Shoshana Riseman (born 1948)
- Irene Marschand Ritter (active 1913–1960)
- Julie Rivé-King (1854–1937)
- Jeanne Rivet (1850–1913)
- Angela Ro Ro (1949–2025)
- Hélène Robert-Mazel (active 1832–1857)
- Gertrud Hermine Kuenzel Roberts (1906–1995)
- Berenice Robinson (1909–1990)
- Fanny Arthur Robinson (1831–1879)
- Frances C. Robinson (1858–1905)
- Gertrude Ina Robinson (1868–1950)
- Louise Robyn (1878–1949)
- Andree Aeschlimann Rochat (1900–1990)
- Helen C. Rockefeller (1907–1957)
- Maria Rodrigo (1888–1967)
- Nicole Rodrigue (1943–2010)
- Marcela Rodríguez (born 1951)
- Betty Roe (born 1930)
- Gloria Roe (1935–2017)
- Jane Roeckel (1833–1907)
- Emily Bruce Roelofson (1832–1921)
- Helen Roessing (1891–1957)
- Esther Rofe (1904–2000)
- Teresa de Rogatis (1893–1979)
- Denise Roger (1924–2005)
- Clara Kathleen Rogers (1844–1931)
- Ethel Tench Rogers (1914–2008)
- Patsy Rogers (born 1938)
- Sharon Elery Rogers (1929–2022)
- Sofie Rohnstock (1875–1964)
- Gertrude Martin Rohrer (1875–1968)
- Yvonne Rokseth (1890–1948)
- Mercedes Roldós Freixes (1910–1980)
- Caro Roma (1869–1937)
- Elena Romero (1923–1996)
- Elise Rondonneau (fl. 1827–1860s)
- Ann Ronell (1906 or 1908–1933)
- Madame Ronssecy (fl. 1780–1820)
- Amanda Röntgen-Maier (1853–1894)
- Grace W. Root (1869–1898)
- Clotilde Rosa (1930–2017)
- Clorinda Rosato (1913–1985)
- B. J. Rosco (born 1932)
- Beatrice Schroeder Rose (1922–2014)
- Pauline Rosenthal (1845–1912)
- Clara Ross (1858–1954)
- Gertrude Ross (1889–1957)
- Camilla de Rossi (fl. 1707–1710)
- Doina Rotaru (born 1951)
- Mathilde Hannah von Rothschild (1832–1924)
- Mildred Barnes Royse (1896–1986)
- Yudif Grigorevna Rozhavskaya (1923–1982)
- Anna Rubin (born 1946)
- Lucja Rucinska (1817, 1818, or 1820–1882)
- Eleanor Rudall (1881–1960)
- Hermine Rudersdorff (1822–1882)
- Anna Lemmer Badenhorst Rudolph (1924–1995)
- Vivian Adelberg Rudow (born 1936)
- Jeanine Rueff (1922–1999)
- Charlotte Ruegger (1876–1959)
- Ana Rugeles (1914–2012)
- Magaly Ruiz (born 1941)
- Claudia Rusca (1593–1676)
- Marjorie Rusche (born 1949)
- Olive Nelson Russell (1905–1989)
- Gilda Ruta (1856–1932)
- Dagmar de Corval Rybner (1890–1965)
- Lalla Ryckoff (1878–1977)

== S ==
- Kaija Saariaho (1952–2023)
- Martha von Sabinin (1831–1892)
- Geni Sadero (1886–1961)
- Sahakdukht (c. 675–c. 736)
- Dilorom Saidaminova (born 1943)
- Georgie Boyden Saint John (1861–1899)
- Sainte des Prez (13th century)
- Didia Saint Georges (1888–1979)
- Charlotte Sainton-Dolby (1821–1885)
- Eva Saito-Noda (1921–2004)
- Marina Saiz-Salazar (1930–1990)
- Janet Mary Salsbury (1881–1951)
- Mary Elizabeth Turner Salter (1856–1938)
- Matilde Salvador (1918–2007)
- Valerie Samson (born 1948)
- Alice Samter (1908–2004)
- Caroline Samuel (1822–1851)
- Marguerite Samuel (1847–1912)
- Rhian Samuel (born 1944)
- Marie Samuelsson (born 1956)
- Manuela Cornejo Sanchez (1854–1902)
- Ann Sandifur (born 1949)
- Eleonor Sandresky (born 1957)
- Margaret Vardell Sandresky (born 1921)
- Iris Sanguesa (born 1933)
- Eugenie Santa Coloma Sourget (1827–1895)
- Amado Santos Ocampo (1925–2009)
- Rocio Sanz (1933–1993)
- Sappho (born c. 612 BCE)
- Antonia Sarcina (born 1963)
- Cora Decker Sargent (1868–1944)
- Jadwiga Sarnecka (1877 or 1883–1913)
- Kimi Sato (born 1949)
- Rebecca Saunders (born 1967)
- Alice Sauvrezis (1866–1946)
- Jane Savage (1752/3–1824)
- Caroline Sawath (19th century)
- Harriet P. Sawyer (1862–1934)
- Carla Scaletti (born 1956)
- Angiola Teresa Moratori Scanabecchi (1662–1708)
- Ethel Scarborough (1880–1956)
- Breda Scek (1893–1968)
- Anna von Schaden (1763–1834)
- Theresa Schaeffer (19th century)
- Claire Schapira (born 1946)
- Marie Schauff (fl. 1799–1844)
- Delphine von Schauroth (1814–1887)
- Magdalene Schauss-Flake (1921–2008)
- Maria Scheepers (1892–1989)
- Tona Scherchen (born 1938)
- Mon Schjelderup (1870–1934)
- Elise Schlick (1790–1855)
- Annette Schlünz (born 1964)
- Elise Schmezer (1810–1856)
- Frieda Schmitt-Lermann (born 1885)
- Else Schmitz-Gohr (1901–1987)
- Maria Schneider (born 1960)
- Amalie Scholl (1823–1879)
- Ruth Schonthal (1924–2006)
- Erna Schorlemmer (1875–1945)
- Eva Schorr (1927–2016)
- Corona Elisabeth Wilhelmine Schröter (1751–1802)
- Georgina Schubert (1840–1878)
- Luise Schulze-Berghof (1889–1970)
- Clara Schumann (1819–1896)
- Meta Schumann (1887–1937)
- Anna Schuppe (1829–1903)
- Maria Schüppel (1923–2011)
- Philippa Duke Schuyler (1931–1967)
- Friederike Schwarz (1910–1945)
- Laura Schwendinger (born 1962)
- Margarete Schweikert (1887–1957)
- E. Anne Schwerdtfeger (1930–2008)
- Wilhelmine Schwertzell (1787–1863)
- Anna Schytte (1877–1953)
- Esther Scliar (1926–1978)
- Alicia Ann Scott (1810–1900)
- Clara H. Scott (1841–1897)
- Margaret Scoville (1944–1978)
- Marina Scriabina (1911–1998)
- Amy Scurria (born 1973)
- Sara Opal Search (1890–1961)
- Virginia Seay (1922–2015)
- Laura Sedgwick Collins (1859–1927)
- Ruth Crawford Seeger (1901–1953)
- Hilda Sehested (1858–1936)
- Sophie Seipt (1812–1889)
- Ilona Sekacz (born 1948)
- Gisela Selden-Goth (1884–1975)
- Blanche Selva (1884–1942)
- Daria Semegen (born 1946)
- Teresa Seneke (1848–1875)
- Johanna Senfter (1879–1961)
- Françoise-Charlotte de Senneterre Ménétou (1679–1745)
- María Luisa Sepúlveda (1896–1958)
- Tat'yana Sergeyeva (born 1951)
- Valentina Serova (1846–1924)
- Ana Serrano Redonnet (191? – 1993)
- H. Servier (1807–1858)
- Claudia Sessa (c.1570 – between 1613 and 1619)
- Marianne Sessi (177?–1847)
- Kilza Setti (born 1932)
- Charlotta Seuerling (1782–1828)
- Marielli Sfakianaki (born 1945)
- Shakhida Shaimardanova (born 1938)
- Masguda Shamsutdinova (born 1955)
- Alex Shapiro (born 1962)
- Sharda (singer) (1933–2023)
- Miriam Shatal (1903–2006)
- Judith Shatin (born 1949)
- Tamara Antonovna Shaverzashvili (1891–1955)
- Alice Marion Shaw (born 1890)
- Caroline Shaw (born 1982)
- Carrie Burpee Shaw (1850–1946)
- Lillian Tait Sheldon (1865–1925)
- Naomi Shemer (1930–2004)
- Elna Sherman (1888–1964)
- Alice Shields (born 1943)
- Chen Shi-hui (born 1962)
- Pan Shiji (born 1957)
- Yoko Shimomura (born 1967)
- Mieko Shiomi (born 1938)
- Verdina Shlonsky (1905–1990)
- Clare Shore (born 1954)
- Marilyn Shrude (born 1946)
- Mme Sicard (fl. 1678)
- Anna Sick (1803–1895)
- Louise Siddall (1879–1935)
- Tamara Maliukova Sidorenko (1919–2005)
- Marie Siegling (1824–1919)
- Beatrice Siegrist (born 1934)
- Arlene Sierra (born 1970)
- Elzbieta Sikora (born 1943)
- Ann Loomis Silsbee (1930–2003)
- Adelaide Pereira da Silva (1928–2021)
- Sheila Silver (born 1946)
- Faye-Ellen Silverman (born 1947)
- Darinka Simic-Mitrovic (born 1937)
- Kate Simmons (1850–1926)
- Cecile Paul Simon (1881–1970)
- Netty Simons (1913–1994)
- Nadezhda Simonyan (1922–1997)
- Clara Sinde Ramallal (born 1935)
- Chitra Singh (born 1940)
- Yekaterina Sinyavina (died 1784)
- Maddalena Laura Sirmen (1745–1818)
- Alice Sirooni (1921–2011)
- Mirjana Sistek-Djordjevic (born 1935)
- Hazel Ghazarian Skaggs (1920–2005)
- Hanna Skalska-Szemioth (1921–1964)
- Nellie Bangs Skelton (1855–1911)
- Fannie Lovering Skinner (1867–1938)
- Synne Skouen (born 1950)
- Irene Skovgaard (1902–1982)
- Janina Skowronska (1920–1992)
- Bettina Skrzypczak (born 1962)
- Dagmara Slianova-Mizandari (1910–1983)
- Jane Sloman (1824–after 1850)
- Harriet Anne Smart (1817–1883)
- Pril Smiley (born 1943)
- Galina Konstantinovna Smirnova (1910–1980)
- Alice Mary Smith (1839–1884)
- Ella May Dunning Smith (1860–1934)
- Irene Britton Smith (1907–1999)
- Julia Smith (1911–1989)
- Linda Catlin Smith (born 1957)
- Nellie von Gerichten Smith (1871–1952)
- Undine Smith Moore (1904–1989)
- Ethel Smyth (1858–1944)
- Jitka Snížková (1924–1989)
- Mary McCarty Snow (1928–2012)
- Joanídia Sodré (1903–1975)
- Charlotte Sohy (1887–1955)
- Josefa Somellera (1810–1885)
- Silvia Sommer (born 1944)
- Brunhilde Sonntag (1936–2002)
- Sylvia Soublette (1924–2020)
- Mildred Souers (1894–1977)
- Ann Southam (1937–2010)
- Isabel Soveral (born 1961)
- Maj Sønstevold (1917–1996)
- Susan Spain-Dunk (1880–1962))
- Eva Ruth Spalding (1883–1969)
- Bernadette Speach (born 1948)
- Anita Socola Specht (1871–1958)
- Lita Spena (1904–1989)
- Fannie Morris Spencer (1865–1943)
- Williametta Spencer (born 1927)
- Laurie Spiegel (born 1945)
- Louise Cooper Spindle (1885–1968)
- Cristina Spinei (born 1984)
- Georgia Spiropoulos (born 1965)
- Louise Spizizen (1928–2010)
- Charlotte Sporleder (1836–1915)
- Hope Squire (1878–1936)
- M. M. Srilekha (born 1974)
- Tui St. George Tucker (1924–2004)
- Patty Stair (1869–1926)
- Louise E. Stairs (1892–1975)
- Elena Stanekaite-Laumyanskene (1880–1960)
- Erika Stang (1861–1898)
- Helen Camille Stanley (1930–2021)
- Iet Stants (1903–1968)
- Anna Diller Starbuck (1868–1929)
- Helen Steele (born 1894)
- Ivana Stefanovic (born 1948)
- Gladys Marie Stein (1900–1989)
- Lena Stein-Schneider (1874–1958)
- Carolyn Steinberg (born 1956)
- Emma Roberto Steiner (1850–1928)
- Gitta Steiner (1932–1990)
- Julia Stilman-Lasansky (1935–2007)
- Elizabeth Stirling (1819–1895)
- Lindsey Stirling (born 1986)
- Magdalene Stirling (1765–1846)
- Margaret McClure Stitt (1886–1979)
- Stella Stocker (1858–1925)
- Morris Stockton (1873–1964)
- Nina Stollewerk (1825–1914)
- Ingrid Stölzel (born 1971)
- Pauline B. Story (1870–1952)
- Louise Strantz (1823–1909)
- Anne Stratton (1887–1977)
- Alice Streatch (1909–1999)
- Lyubov Streicher (1888–1958)
- Else Streit (1869–?)
- Lily Strickland (1887–1958)
- Barbara Strozzi (1619–1677)
- Dorothy Strutt (1941–2019)
- Elsa Stuart-Bergstrom (1889–1970)
- Maria Anna Stubenberg (1821–1912)
- Herma Studeny (1886–1973)
- Dorothy Geneva Styles (1922–1984)
- Meenakshi Subramanyam
- Dana Suesse (1909–1987)
- Kyungsun Suh (born 1942)
- Marion Dix Sullivan (fl. 1840–50)
- Mira Sulpizi (born 1923)
- Asya Sultanova (1923–2021)
- Heidi Sundblad-Halme (1903–1973)
- Anna Suszczynska (1877–1931)
- Margaret Sutherland (1897–1984)
- Rodica Sutzu (1913–1979)
- Natela Svanidze (1926–2017)
- Elizabeth Swados (1951–2016)
- Freda Swain (1902–1985)
- Elsa Swartz (1874–1948)
- Edith Swepstone (fl. 1885–1930)
- Kay Swift (1897–1993)
- Gloria Wilson Swisher (1935–2023)
- Mary Helena Synge (1840–1917)
- Jadwiga Szajna-Lewandowska (1912–1994)
- Iris Szeghy (born 1956)
- Erzsébet Szőnyi (1924–2019)
- Margit Sztaray (1859–?)
- Maria Agata Szymanowska (1789–1831)
- Iwonka Bogumila Szymanska (born 1943)
- Joan Szymko (born 1957)

== T ==
- Dobrinka Tabakova (born 1980)
- Germaine Tailleferre (1892–1983)
- Toyoko Takami (born 1945)
- Marjo Tal (1915–2006)
- Louise Talma (1906–1996)
- Karen Tanaka (born 1961)
- Hilary Tann (1947–2023)
- Bertha Tapper (1859–1915)
- Frances Tarbox (1874–1959)
- Charlotte Tardieu (1829–1890)
- Karen Tarlow (born 1947)
- Phyllis Tate (1911–1987)
- Erna Tauro (1916–1993)
- Cornelia Tautu (1938–2019)
- Katherine Teck (born 1939)
- Alice Tegnér (1864–1943)
- Anna Teichmüller (1861–1940)
- Nancy Telfer (born 1950)
- Hope Temple (1859–1938)
- Maria Elizabeth van Ebbenhorst Tengbergen (1885–1980)
- Anice Terhune (1873–1964)
- Anne Terrier Laffaille (1904–1971)
- Alicia Terzian (born 1934)
- Ivana Marburger Themmen (born 1935)
- Rose Thisse-Derouette (1902–1989)
- Annette Thoma (1886–1974)
- Gertrude Auld Thomas (1872–1959)
- Jennifer Thomas (pianist) (born 1977)
- Augusta Read Thomas (born 1964)
- Diane Thome (1942–2025)
- Alexandra Thomson (1867–1907)
- Ellen R. Thompson (1928–2014)
- Shirley Thompson (born 1958)
- Anna S. Þorvaldsdóttir (Anna Thorvaldsdottir) (born 1977)
- Pauline Thys (c. 1836–1909)
- Tibors (fl. mid-12th century)
- Zdenka Ticharich (1900–1979)
- Bertha Tideman-Wijers (1887–1976)
- Jeanette Tillett (1888–1965)
- Eta Mayseyewna Tïrmand (1917–2008)
- Katia Tiutiunnik (born 1967)
- Zlata Tkach (1928–2006)
- Helen Tobias-Duesberg (1919–2010)
- Esther Cox Todd (1895–1971)
- Denise Tolkowsky (1918–1991)
- Leonie Tonel (died 1886)
- Celia Torra (1889–1962)
- Joan Tower (born 1938)
- Marie Townsend (1851–1912)
- Natalie Townsend (1866–1962)
- Michiko Toyama (1908–2000)
- Elinor Meissner Traeger (1906–1983)
- Susan Trew (born 1853)
- Joan Trimble (1915–2000)
- Ruth Tripp (1897–1971)
- Alba Trissina (fl. 1622)
- Theodora Troendle (1893–1972)
- Wilhelmine von Troschke und Rosenwehrt (1775–1830)
- Josephine Trott (1874–1950)
- Josephine Troup (1853–1912)
- Agnes Tschetschulin (1859–1942)
- Julia Tsenova (1948–2010)
- Emahoy Tsegué-Maryam Guèbrou (1923–2023)
- Karmella Tsepkolenko (born 1955)
- Calliope Tsoupaki (born 1963)
- Felicia Tuczek (1849–1905)
- Louise Tunison (1872–1899)
- Mildred Cozzens Turner (1897–1992)
- Myra Brooks Turner (1936–2017)
- Florence Turner-Maley (1871–1962)
- Pava Turtygina (1902–1985)
- Hendrika van Tussenbroek (1854–1935)
- Mary Lynn Twombly (born 1935)
- Norma Tyer (born 1928)
- Agnes Tyrrell (1846–1883)
- Mildred Lund Tyson (1895–1989)

== U ==
- Carolina Uccelli (1810–1885)
- Ludmila Ulehla (1923–2009)
- Antonietta Gambara Untersteiner (1846–1896)
- Anne Upton (1892–1970)
- Alicia Urreta (1933–1987)
- Irma Urteaga (1929–2022)
- Julia Usher (born 1945)
- Galina Ustvolskaya (1919–2006)
- Yolande Uyttenhove (1925–2000)

== W ==
- Mimi Wagensonner (1897–1970)
- Ho Wai-On (born 1946)
- Harriet Wainwright (c. 1766–1843)
- Mary Augusta Wakefield (1853–1910)
- Josephine-Rosalie de Walckiers (1756–1836)
- Julie Waldburg-Wurzach (1841–1914)
- Freya Waley-Cohen (born 1989)
- Caroline Holme Walker (1863–1955)
- Ella May Walker (1892–1960)
- Gwyneth Van Anden Walker (born 1947)
- Shirley Walker (1945–2006)
- Joelle Wallach (born 1946)
- Errollyn Wallen (born 1958)
- Maria Antonia Walpurgis of Bavaria (1724–1780)
- Jennifer Walshe (born 1974)
- Constance Walton (1919–2017)
- Tekla Griebel-Wandall (1866–1940)
- Dorothy Wanderman (1897–1988)
- An-Ming Wang (born 1926)
- Qiang Wang (born 1935)
- Ying Wang (born 1976)
- Kate Lucy Ward (1833–1915)
- Hermene Warlick Eichhorn (1906–2001)
- Katharine Mulky Warne (1923–2015)
- Elinor Remick Warren (1900–1991)
- Thérèse Wartel (1814–1865)
- Satella Waterstone (1875–1938)
- Mabel Madison Watson (1872–1952)
- Regina Watson (1845–1913)
- Ruth Watson Henderson (born 1932)
- Carol Ann Weaver (born 1948)
- Mary Watson Weaver (1903–1990)
- Alliene Brandon Webb (1910–1965)
- Julie von Webenau née Baroni-Cavalcabo (1813–1874)
- Vilma von Webenau (1875–1953)
- Bertha Weber (1887–1961)
- Bertha Frensel Wegener (1874–1953)
- Emmy Wegener (1901–1973)
- Vally Weigl (1889–1982)
- Judith Weir (born 1954)
- Helen L. Weiss (1920–1948)
- Edith Weiss-Mann (1885–1951)
- Svea Nordblad Welander (1898–1985)
- Georgina Weldon (1837–1914)
- Jane Sinclair Wells (born 1952)
- Norma Wendelburg (1918–2016)
- Sara Wennerberg-Reuter (1875–1959)
- Elisabet Wentz-Janacek (1923–2014)
- Rosy Wertheim (1888–1949)
- Helen Searles Westbrook (1889–1967)
- Sophia Maria Westenholz (1759–1838)
- Hildegard Westerkamp (born 1946)
- Mildred Weston (1892–1975)
- Adelheid Wette (1858–1916)
- June Weybright (1903–1996)
- Janet Wheeler (born 1957)
- Mabel Wheeler Daniels (1877–1971)
- Claude Porter White (1907–1975)
- Elise Fellows White (1873–1953)
- Estelle White (1925–2011)
- Maude Valérie White (1855–1937)
- Ruth White (1925–2013)
- Gillian Whitehead (born 1941)
- Bessie Marshall Whitely (1871–1944)
- E. Florence Whitlock (1889–1978)
- Dorothy Whitson Freed (1919–2000)
- Chris Mary Francine Whittle (born 1927)
- Caroline Wichern (1836–1906)
- Florence Wickham (1880–1962)
- Aimée Van de Wiele (1907–1991)
- Lili Wieruszowski (1899–1971)
- Frances Turgeon Wiggin (1891–1985)
- Mary Wiggins (1904–1974)
- Margaret Wigham (1904–1972)
- Inger Wikström (born 1939)
- Clara Wildschut (1906–1950)
- Margaret Jones Wiles (1911–2000)
- Wilhelmine of Bayreuth (1709–1758)
- Maria Wilhelmj (1850s–1930)
- Margaret Lucy Wilkins (born 1939)
- Grace Williams (1906–1977)
- Jean E. Williams (1876–1965)
- Joan Franks Williams (1930–2003)
- Mary Lou Williams (1910–1981)
- Regina Hansen Willman (1914–1965)
- Edwina Florence Wills (1915–2002)
- Addie Anderson Wilson (1876–1966)
- Gertrude Hoag Wilson (1888–1968)
- Hilda Wilson (1860–1918)
- Joan Dolores Wilson (born 1933)
- Helen Wing (1892–1981)
- Therese Emilie Henriette Winkel (1784–1867)
- Elisabeth Wintzer (1863–1933)
- Edith Wire (1889–1973)
- Debbie Wiseman (born 1963)
- Caroline Wiseneder (1807–1868)
- Betty Rose Wishart (born 1947)
- Beatrice Witkin (1916–1990)
- Monica Witni (1930–1982)
- Therese Wittman (1869–1942)
- Diane Wittry (born 1964)
- Maria Carolina Wolf (1742–1820)
- Julia Wolfe (born 1958)
- Sophie Wolff-Fritz (1858–1938)
- Erna Woll (1917–2005)
- Gertrude Price Wollner (1900–1985)
- Elsa Laura Wolzogen (1876–1945)
- Betty Ann Wong (born 1938)
- Hsiung-Zee Wong (born 1947)
- Mary Knight Wood (1857–1944)
- Amy Woodforde-Finden (1860–1919)
- Eliza Woods (1872–1961)
- Emma Wooge (1857–1935)
- Julia Woolf (1831–1893)
- Lola Carrier Worrell (1870–1929)
- Amy Aldrich Worth (1888–1967)
- Ellen Riley Wright (1859–1904)
- Minnie T. Wright (composer) (c.1874–c.1929)
- Nannie Louise Wright (1879–1958)
- Mary Ann Wrighten (1751–1796)
- Caroline Wuiet (1766–1835)
- Sinta Wullur (born 1958)
- Ilse Gerda Wunsch (1911–2003)
- Mary J. A. Wurm (1860–1938)
- Stephanie Wurmbrand-Stuppach (1849–1919)
- Ann Wyeth McCoy (1915–2005)
- Ruth Shaw Wylie (1916–1989)

== X ==
- Margareta Xenopol (1892–1979)
- Shuxian Xiao (1905–1991)
- Huguang Xin (1933–2011)
- Qu Xixian (1919–2008)

== Y ==
- Yevgania Yosifovna Yakhina (1918–1983)
- Michiru Yamane (born 1963)
- Ludmila Anatolievna Yaroshevskaya (1906–1975)
- Louise Yazbeck (1910–1995)
- Arlene Buckneberg Ydstie (1928–2025)
- Irina Yel'cheva (1926–2013)
- Chen Yi (born 1953)
- Barbara York (1949-2020)
- Eliza Mazzucato Young (1846–1937)
- Harriet Maitland Young (1828–1923)
- Jane Corner Young (1915–2001)
- Nina C. Young (born 1984)
- Rolande Maxwell Young (1927–2015)
- Glad Robinson Youse (1898–1985)

== Z ==
- Jeanne Zaidel-Rudolph (born 1948)
- Judith Lang Zaimont (born 1945)
- Barbara Maria Zakrzewska-Nikiporczyk (1946–2023)
- Arlene Zallman (1934–2006)
- Stefania Anatolyevna Zaranek (1904–1972)
- Maria Semyonovna Zavalishina (1903–1991)
- Ruth Zechlin (1926–2007)
- Isidora Zegers (1803–1869)
- Dafina Zeqiri (composer) (born 1984)
- Gaziza Zhubanova (1927–1993)
- Valentine Yanovna Zhubinskaya (1926–2013)
- Inna Abramovna Zhvanetskaia (1937–2024)
- Zinaida Petrovna Ziberova (born 1909)
- Lidia Zielinska (born 1953)
- Grete von Zieritz (1899–2001)
- Frances Ziffer (1917–1996)
- Marilyn J. Ziffrin (1926–2018)
- Agnes Zimmermann (1847–1925)
- Margrit Zimmermann (1927–2020)
- Phyllis Zimmerman (1934–2012)
- Mirjana Živkovic (1935–2020)
- Emiliana de Zubeldia (1888–1987)
- Marija Zubova (1749–1799)
- Mana Zucca (1885–1981)
- Emilie Zumsteeg (1796–1857)
- Mirca Župnek Sancin (1901–1970)
- Esther Zweig (1906–1981)
- Ellen Taaffe Zwilich (born 1939)

== See also ==
- List of Australian women composers
