= Kitazume =

Kitazume (written: 北爪) is a Japanese surname. Notable people with the surname include:

- Hiroyuki Kitazume (北爪 宏幸, born 1961), Japanese animator, manga artist and illustrator
- Kengo Kitazume (北爪 健吾, born 1992), Japanese footballer
- Michio Kitazume (北爪 道夫, born 1948), Japanese classical composer and conductor
- Yayoi Kitazume (北爪 やよひ, born 1945), Japanese composer
