= Nerantzis =

Nerantzis (Greek: Νεράντζης) is a Greek surname, with the feminine form being Nerantzi (Νεράντζη). The name is derived from the bitter orange (Greek: Νεραντζιά). Notable people with this surname include:

- Anastasios Nerantzis, Greek politician (1944–2021)
- Pavlos Nerantzis, Greek commander in the Greco-Turkish war of 1897 (died 1911)
- Susanna Nerantzi, 19th century Greek pianist and composer

== See also ==
- Nerantza, a village in the municipality of Velo-Vocha, Corinthia (Peloponnese)
- Nerantzies, a village in the municipality of Sympoliteia, Achaea (Western Greece)
