= Malumbres =

Malumbres is a surname. Notable people with the surname include:

- Iñaki Malumbres (born 1975), Spanish handball player
- María Dolores Malumbres (1931–2019), Spanish pianist
