= Ellen Coleman =

Ellen Coleman may refer to:

- Ellen Coleman (composer) (1886–1973), English conductor and composer
- Ellen Coleman (footballer) (born 1995), Ghanaian footballer
