= Diana Hay =

Diana Hay may refer to:

- Diana Hay, 23rd Countess of Erroll (1926–1978), Scottish noblewoman
- Diana Pereira Hay (born 1932), Danish pianist and composer
