= Mara Margaret Helmuth =

American composer

Margaret Mara Helmuth (born 1957) is an American composer. She studied at the University of Illinois Urbana–Champaign, and then continued her studies at Columbia University, graduating with a doctorate in music.

After completing her education, Helmuth took a position teaching at the University of Cincinnati and became director of the university's Center for Computer Music. She has published professional articles in Audible Traces, Analytical Methods of Electroacoustic Music, the Journal of New Music Research and Perspectives of New Music. She was a co-editor of the Society for Electro-Acoustic Music in the United States' newsletter along with Sylvia Pengilly and Sally Johnston Reid from 1995 to 1996.

== Works ==
Helmuth is known for electronic music. She composes for fixed format and also creates interactive installations. Selected works include:

- Mellipse (1989, 1995)
- Abandoned Lake in Maine (1997)
- Bugs and Ice: A Question of Focus (2002)
- Where Is My Voice, for fixed format audio
- Hidden Mountain (2007)
- Staircase of Light (2003)
- Hidden Mountain 2, interactive multimedia and wireless-sensor-based installation

Her work has been recorded and issued on CD, including:

- Sound Collaborations, v. 36 of the Consortium to Distribute Computer Music Series, Centaur Records
- Implements of Actuation collaborations with percussionist-composer Allen Otte, Electronic Music Foundation
- Open Space CD 16 music for tape
