= Jane Sloman =

Jane Sloman (b. Ipswich, 15 December 1824, d. after 1850) was an English composer, pianist, and vocalist who had an active concert career in the United States during the 1840s. She is best known for writing the songs "Roll on, Silver Moon", "Forget Thee", and the "Maiden's Farewell." Her music was also published under the name Jane Sloman Torry.

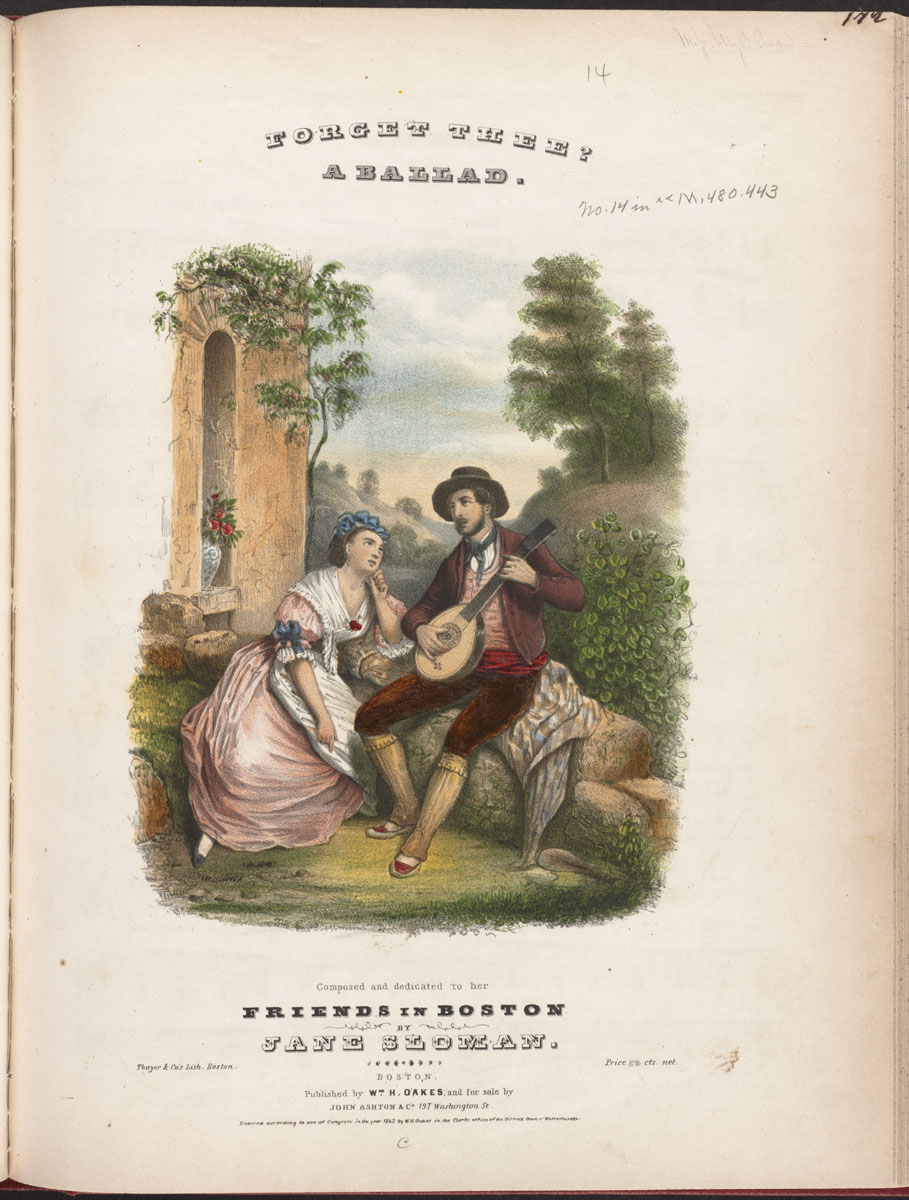
Forget Thee? (Boston Public Library)

== Early life ==
Sloman was a child prodigy, distinguishing herself on piano from an early age under the tutelage of Louise Dulcken, Queen Victoria’s piano teacher. She made multiple appearances at the British royal court and played informally with the violin virtuoso Niccolò Paganini and the gifted pianist Sigismond Thalberg. In 1839, she moved to the United States as one of the only female piano virtuosos in the country. Sloman gave piano lessons to a few students before she made her American concert debut.

== Debut and Concert Career ==
Sloman’s debut was held at Niblo's Gardens in New York on 16 July 1841, when she was seventeen. She subsequently went on tour, performing in cities such as Philadelphia and Boston. As one of the first virtuosic female pianists to come to the United States, she was seen as a novelty. The Norton Grove Dictionary of Women Composers notes that “Her first concerts were accompanied by a biographical sketch, which established her as a child prodigy who was entirely self-taught in composition, yet also modest and of a "good character" appropriate for a Victorian professional woman.” Her performances were received well, with the press in Boston noting her tasteful and passionate interpretations of Helz, Döhler, Thalberg, and Liszt. She was among the first generation of professional women composers that emerged in the 1850s, including Augusta Browne, Marion Dix Sullivan, Faustina Hodges, and Susan Parkhurst. Her last known concert took place on February 18, 1850.

== Songs and Compositions ==
Sloman wrote both popular songs and compositions. Her work ranged from simple pop tunes to the more classical, chromatic styles that characterized mid-19th-century Romantic composers. She was often her own lyricist and was notable for providing a female perspective about love and courtship in her songs. In her feminist ballad “I’ll Make Him Speak Out,” she expresses sentiments such as “Are women’s hearts playthings to be broken by boys?” She was also the editor of The Melodist, a vocal collection that featured her preferred piano accompaniments to popular songs and several original choral melodies set to lyric. Her compositions were published under the name Sloman Torry after 1862. While her last public appearance as a pianist occurred in 1850, her songs and compositions continued to be published until 1902, speaking to their lingering popularity.

== Works ==
Selected works include:

- Forget Thee? (Boston, 1843)
- The Maiden’s Farewell (Boston, 1843)
- Roll on, Silver Moon (New York, 1848)
- I’ll Make Him Speak Out (New York, 1852)
- Take Back the Ring (New York, 1860)
- The Butterfly (New York, 1861)
- So Far Away (New York, 1869)
- Queen of the Night (Del Ciel Regina), 1v, pf (Boston, 1873)
- Margery Drew
- Titania (n.p., 1902)
- Constancy (Boston, 1880)
- Mon Amie; Bacarolle (Boston & Chicago, 1882)
- Love’s Whisper (Boston, 1879)
- Drifting Away (Boston, 1876)
- Carina (Boston, 1878)
- Star of the Morn (New York, 1873)
- The Waiting Heart (Boston, 1882)
- Milkmaid’s Song (New York, 1875)
- Sing Bonny Robin (New York, 1876)
- Waiting at the Brookside (New York, 1873)
- Don’t Be Jealous (New York, 1975)
- Unforgiven (New York, 1877)
- The Zephyr (Boston, 1881)
