= Sally Johnston Reid =

American composer and oboist (1948–2019)

Sally Johnston Reid (January 30, 1948 – December 21, 2019) was an American composer and oboist. A long-time professor of composition and music theory at Abilene Christian University, her works include chamber, piano, vocal, band and electroacoustic music, as well as the chamber opera Healing from 1986.

A significant part of her career was dedicated to the advancement of women in music. Her leadership was credited for bringing the International Alliance for Women in Music increased membership and higher visibility. She was a trailblazer in digital synthesis.

== Biography ==
Sally Johnston was born in East Liverpool, Ohio, on January 30, 1948, and graduated with a Ph.D. from the University of Texas in Austin. She served on the music faculty at Abilene Christian University in Abilene, Texas beginning in 1969 and became Chair of the Department of Music there in 1979. She became Department Chair at Lipscomb University in 2008. She won a composition prize from Mu Phi Epsilon, a number of American Society of Composers, Authors and Publishers (ASCAP) awards, and first prize at the Fifth International Festival of Women Composers at Indiana University of Pennsylvania in 1998.

Reid served as editor of the International League of Women Composers (ILWC) Journal from 1991–95 and was one of the primary organizers of that association's consolidation with the International Alliance for Women in Music in 1995. She established a website for the International Alliance for Women in Music by using her skills as a web developer and she organized others to help create an online resource center linked to women's museums, women's organizations, biographies about women composers and other sites helpful to people invested in women's music. In 1996 she attended the Fiuggi Citta International Music Festival as the only commissioned American composer and she wrote her Fiuggi Fanfare for the symposium. At the symposium she gave a presentation entitled Women in Music on the World Wide Web promoting the website she had created to highlight women in music and opportunities. She was also the listowner for the International Alliance for Women in Music distribution list.

She was a co-editor of the Society for Electro-Acoustic Music in the United States' newsletter along with Sylvia Pengilly and Mara Helmuth from 1995-1996. She would later become the president of the International Alliance for Women in Music from 1999-2000. Rome’s Vatican Audience Chamber performed her Jesus, Redeemer, Messiah composition as part of the Roman Catholic Church’s Jubilee 2000 celebration. She appeared in the film The Devil and Daniel Johnston in 2005.

== Works ==
Reid’s work has been performed all over the United States and Europe. Her compositions include music for symphonic band, for chamber ensembles, incidental music, electronic music, vocal music and music for piano. Some of her works combine acoustic and electroacoustic elements.

Selected works include:

- Healing 1986, chamber opera
- A Carousel Fantasy for brass quintet and synthesized Wurlitzer band organ, 1993
- Note the Silence for voice and chamber ensemble, 1975
- Fiuggi Fanfare for saxophone quintet, 1998
- On a Day of White Trees for mezzo-soprano and B♭ clarinet, 1998
