= Jean E. Williams =

English-born Canadian composer (1876–1965)

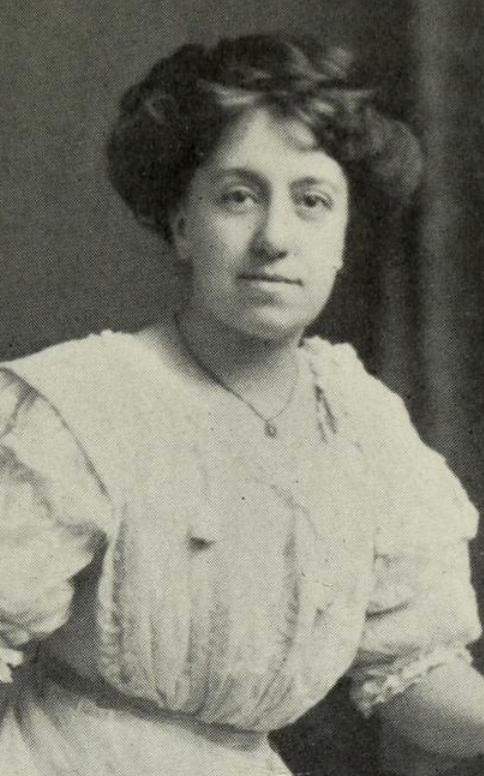
Jean E. Williams, from a 1910 publication

Jean Elizabeth Williams (20 January 1876 – July 1965) was a composer. She was born in Wednesbury, England, then moved to Toronto, Canada. After graduating from the Royal Conservatory of Music of the University of Toronto, she returned to England and studied to be a concert pianist.

Williams changed her career plans from performance to teaching after breaking her wrist. She returned to the University of Toronto to teach voice and piano. She later taught in Cleveland, Ohio, and St. Louis, Missouri, before moving to Portland, Oregon, in 1932.

Williams served as president of the National Music Teachers Association and as president of Mu Phi Epsilon, a professional music fraternity. She collaborated on two music education books with Nellie Tholen, who later donated Williams' papers to the University of Oregon, where they are archived.

Williams' compositions include:

== Chamber ==
- Gavotte (violin and piano)
- Valse (violin and piano)

== Orchestra ==
- Concertina for Piano and String Orchestra
- Junior Piano Concerto No. 6
- Piano Concerto in a minor
- Piano Concerto in C
- Piano Concerto in F Major
- (Second) Piano Concerto in C

== Piano ==
- Bolero (for two pianos)
- Dresden China Figures (Minuet V)
- Fairy Piper
- Gavotte in G Major
- Partita
- Polka
- Prelude Funebre
- Red Bird Singing
- Scherzo in a minor
- Sicilienne
- Sonatina in G
- Tango in c minor
- Toccata
- Valse Chanson
- Valse in d minor
- Zwei Canzonen aus dem Fiori Musicale

== Piano or vocal (unspecified) ==
- Adeste Fideles (transcription)
- Allegro a la Tarantella
- Aria
- Baby Moon
- Bells
- Boys Are Marching
- Cherry Ripe
- Christmas Music for Treble Voices
- Crossing the Bar
- Dance Johnny!
- Dance of the Puppets
- Dance with Me
- Danza Espagnola
- Do You Sleep?
- Doll's Wedding
- Fife and Drum
- Fireside Memories
- Flying Leaf
- Four Christmas Songs
- Four O' Clock in the Morning
- Fun in China
- Grandfather Clock
- Happy Dreams
- Heritage
- Hermit Thrush
- In Far Places
- In Old Algiers
- Indian Lullaby
- Indian Tales
- Little Irish Donkey
- Lord Christ the Carpenter
- Lord, Thou Hast Been Our Dwelling Place
- Lovely Senorita
- Low Tide
- Musical Snuff Box
- Negro Lullaby
- Noel
- Old Spinet
- Painted Fan
- Paisley Shawl
- Pastourelle Pensif
- Patriot's Song
- Rain! Rain!
- Resurrection
- Ring, Ring Ye Bells (for women's chorus and piano; first verse by Jean Williams, second verse by Alfred Lord Tennyson)
- Ring Out Wild Bells
- The Roaming Bumble Bee
- Scout March
- Simple Simon
- Sleep Holy Child
- Slumber Little One
- Slumber Song
- Snow by Night
- Soldiers down the Street
- Star of My Heart
- Strange Port
- Street Parade
- These Are They
- This is Oregon
- To a Winter Robin
- Toby Jug
- Train
- Vin et les Cloches
- Wind and the Waves
- Wind Chimes and Lanterns
- Wind in the Night
- Winter Sleep
