= Linda Woodaman Ostrander =

American composer and writer (born 1937)

Linda Woodaman Ostrander (born February 17, 1937) is an American composer and writer.

== Personal life ==
Ostrander lived on Long Island as a child and her family supported her creativity. Her father taught her watercolor painting and music, while her mother encouraged her to write. She received a Bachelor of Music degree at Oberlin College in 1958, a Master of Arts degree from Smith College in 1960, and a Doctor of Musical Arts degree from Boston University in 1972. She was a lecturer at Adelphi University from 1961 to 1963, a faculty member at Southampton College from 1963 to 1964, a music consultant at Lesley College from 1972 to 1973, and an assistant professor at Bunker Hill Community College.

== Awards ==
Ostrander received the Settie Lehman Fatman Prize in 1960. She has a listing in International Who's who in Music and Musicians' Directory.

== Works ==
- Variations and theme for string quartet (1958)
- Suite for chamber orchestra (1960)
- Game of Chance (1968)
- Time studies : for violin, oboe, trombone, percussion and tape recorder (1970)
- Creative piano : a modular approach for adult beginners (1978)
- Encounters : for violin and tape (1988)
- Images of women : looking forward, looking back (1994)
