= Minnie T. Wright (composer) =

American pianist and composer (c. 1874–1929)

Minnie T. Wright (c. 1874 – c. 1929) was an American pianist, organist, and composer from Philadelphia.

== Biography ==
Her compositions "A Summer Day" and "Love-Song" were recommended as "drawing room" pieces. Louis Armstrong recorded her song "Love Song" as part of his 1933 single "Laughin' Louie", Armstrong historian Ricky Riccardi surmising it was "a theme Armstrong must have played countless times while accompanying silent movies with Tate’s Orchestra". Vince Giordano and Gosta Hagloff identified the piece as one used as silent film accompaniment since the early 1920s, including Charlie Chaplin's Easy Street segment of the 1938 compilation The Charlie Chaplin Festival. Howard Thurston also used "Love Song" as the accompanying music to his illusion "The Levitation of Princess Karnac". Of the piece, Jim Steinmeyer wrote: "The melody and bridges are fascinating; it’s easy to imagine how this was a theatrical showpiece and how it perfectly accompanied the famous illusion."

She was stated in The Diapason to have "won considerable reputation as a composer of music of the lighter and popular order".

== Music ==
- "Meeting" (1912), music, words by Laura M. Ford
- "A Summer Day", arranged by Adolf Schmid (1920)
- "Love-Song", arranged by Otto Langey (1920)
- "Springtime", arranged by Maurice Baron (1924)
- "Ave Maria", arranged by Th. Baker (1924)
- "Dance of the Sea-Fairies" (1924)
- "Like as the Hart" (1924)
- "The Faun", arranged by Tom Clark (1926)
- By the Lotus Pool, orchestrated by Adolf Schmid
