= Marianella Machado =

Venezuelan writer and composer (born 1959)

Marianella P. Machado (born August 4, 1959) is a Venezuelan writer and composer.

== Biography ==
Marianella Machado was born in Caracas, Venezuela, and studied at the Conservatorio de Musica José Ángel Lamas. She later continued her studies in composition with William Banch, and in 1981 she attended Indiana University School of Music in Bloomington on a Venezuenlan government scholarship, graduating with bachelor's and master's degrees in composition.

Marchado returned to Venezuela, where she began work as a music teacher and composer. From 1987-88 she was a research assistant at the Rómulo Gallegos Center for Latin American Studies in Caracas. From 1989-93 she attended the University of Cincinnati – College-Conservatory of Music, working as a teaching assistant, and graduated with a Doctor of Musical Arts degree in 1993.

In 1994 Machado began pursuing an interest in Spanish as second language and Hispanic literature. She attended the Department of Romance Languages and Literatures of the University of Cincinnati on assistantship where she graduated with a Master of Arts in 1996 and a PhD in Hispanic Literature in 1998.

From 1998-2003 she worked as a professor at the Universidad Católica Andrés Bello in Caracas. In August 2003 she took a position as Assistant Professor of Spanish in the Department of Foreign Languages and Humanities at Eastern Kentucky University in the United States.

== Works ==
Selected works include:

- Inmutable for French horn solo (2002)
- Tonos Diamantinos No. 6 for woodwind quartet (2003)
- Remembranza for string orchestra (2004)
- The Triumph of Love (2005)
- Butterfly Triptych (2006)

Machado has written a number of papers and articles, including Contra el secreto professional on Peruvian poet Cesar Vallejo for the Cincinnati Conference for Romance Languages and Literatures. She also published a review on the book Siete y tres nueve by Colombian writer Jose Cardona in the journal Chasqui at the University of Nebraska–Lincoln. She has written books including Encuentros Causales (2009) and Menudencias (2009).
