= Lila Lalauni =

Greek pianist and composer (1918–1996)

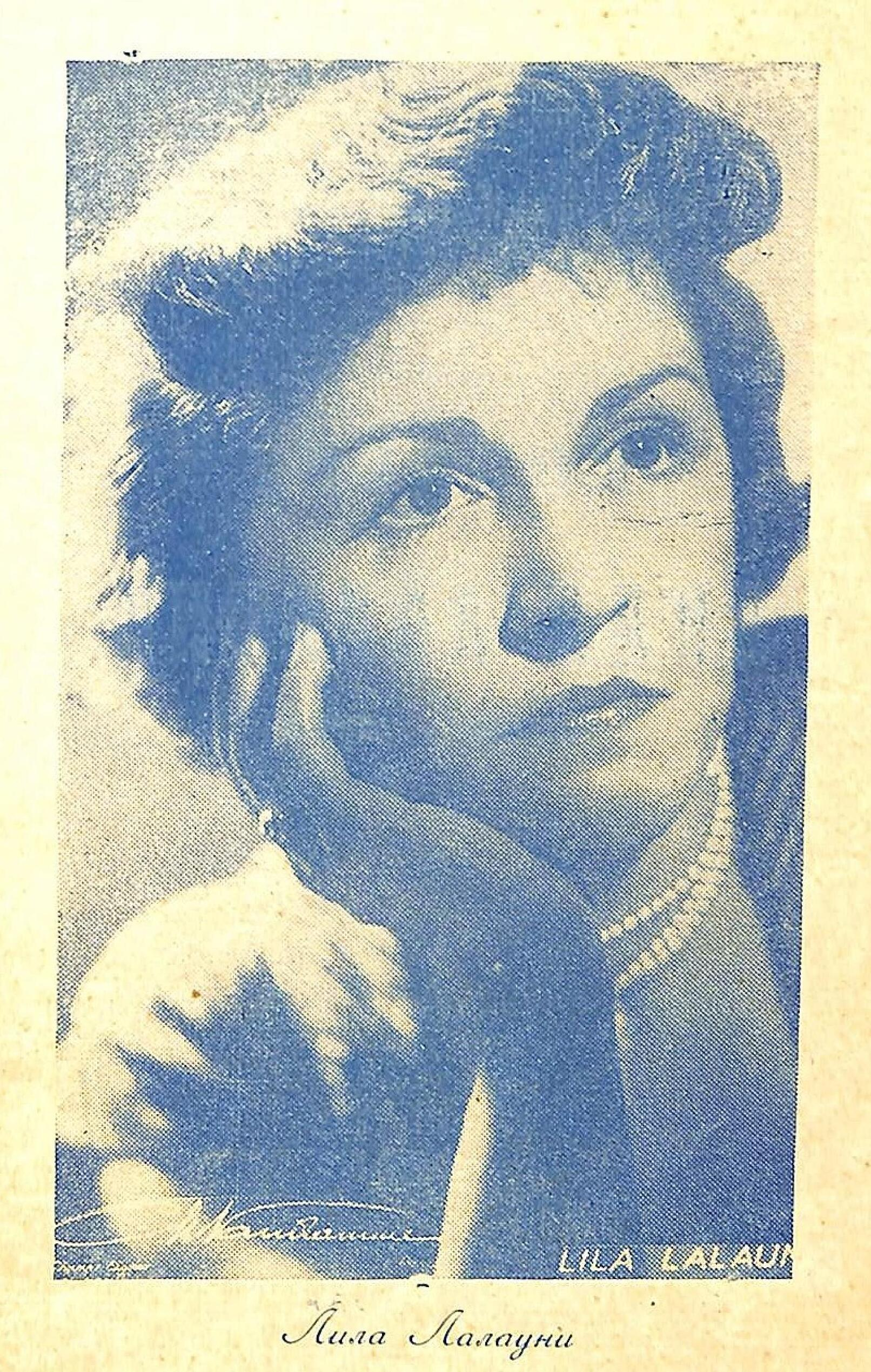
- Born: 9 June 1918; Athens, Greece
- Died: 12 February 1996 (aged 77); Paris, France
- Occupation(s): Pianist; Composer

Lila Lalauni (Greek: Λίλα Λαλαούνη; 9 June 1918 – 12 February 1996) was a Greek pianist and composer who frequently performed in Greece and around Europe. She was also the first person to teach Manolis Kalomiris' Symphonic Concerto for piano and orchestra.

== Early life and education ==
Lila Lalauni was born on 9 June 1918 in Athens and was the daughter of music critic Alexandra Lalauni (1894–1974) and musician Alexandros Xanthopoulou. She was the granddaughter of composer Timotheos Xanthopoulos (c. 1864–1942). She expressed a talent for music at an early age and became a piano child prodigy. From the age of six, she began studying piano in Vienna. Three years later, aged nine, Lalauni performed as a soloist with the Vienna Symphony orchestra as well as performing with the Athens Conservatory Symphony orchestra aged twelve. From 1927 to 1930 she studied piano at the Academy of Fine Arts Vienna and then afterwards studied composition under Robert Konta, before graduating from the academy in 1934. Afterwards, Lalauni travelled to Paris where she was taught to play the organ by Marcel Dupré. She was also taught by the composer Karl Weigl and the pianist Artur Schnabel.

== Career ==
Lalauni made her debut as a concert pianist in Vienna in around 1930. In 1934, she performed Richard Strauss's Burleske alongside Strauss himself, who was impressed by her performance. Lalauni was the first to teach Manolis Kalomiris' Symphonic Concerto for orchestra and piano.

She frequently collaborated with the Athens State Orchestra, Berlin Philharmonic, London Symphony and Vienna Philharmonic orchestras, while also performing frequently in Greece and on radio and television stations throughout Europe.

Lalauni served as a hand double for Simone Signoret in the film Shadow and Light in scenes where Signoret played the piano.

== Later life and death ==
From 1945, she lived permanently in Paris. She died there on 12 February 1996, at the age of 77.

== Works ==
Lalauni composed piano concertos, songs, chamber music and a symphony. Selected works include:

- Syntheses et catalysis, symphony, 1960–62
- Piano Concerto [No. 1], 1943
- Piano Concerto [No. 2], 1959
