= Josefina Brdlíková =

Czech translator, singer and pianist (1843–1910)

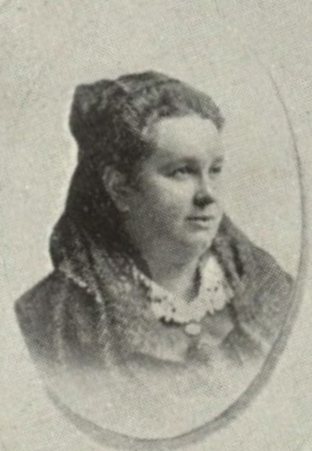
Josefina Brdlíková

Josefina Brdlíková (née Mourková; 20 March 1843 – 21 April 1910) was a Czech translator, singer, pianist and composer. She was born in Prague and studied music in Paris and London. She married the mayor and industrialist Jan Brdlík, who was a founder of coal tar chemical factories, and lived in Počátky until 1899. In 1894, her husband opened a new branch of his business and the couple moved to Kralupy.

After her husband died, Brdlíková returned to Prague, where she studied astronomy and languages. She composed, wrote and translated, and performed as a singer and pianist. She died in Prague.

== Works ==
Selected works include:

- Aphorismen in Walzerform, for piano four-hands (pub. 1897)
