= Caroline Wiseneder =

German composer

Caroline Schneider Wiseneder (20 August 1807 – 25 August 1868) was a German composer and music educator who developed a musical notation system for the blind, as well as a kindergarten music curriculum. She was born in Braunschweig, and married an opera singer named Wiseneder. She founded several singing societies, in addition to the Wiseneder Music School for the Blind in 1860, which became the model for several schools throughout Germany. Her method for teaching instrumental music to young children was adopted by the national kindergarten movement established in Germany about 1873. Among other teaching tools, Caroline used toy orchestra instruments which were carefully tuned to harmonize together. She believed that children should always be accompanied by an instrument when they sang. After her death, a marble bust of Caroline was placed in the Braunschweig town library in honor of her achievements.

Caroline composed many melodramas, songs, and educational works, including:

== Books ==
- Selection of Songs and Games from the Kindergarten of the Music Education School in Braunschweig, with an Appendix for the Elementary Class (editor)
- Song and Movement Games

== Opera ==
- Das Jubelfest, oder Die drei Gefangenen (The Jubilee, or The Three Prisoners), 1849
- Die Palastdame (The Palace Lady), 1848
- La Dame de Paris (The Lady of Paris)

== Vocal ==
- Abschied (Farewell), opus 9
- Die Kraft der Erinnerungen (The Power of Memories), opus 8 (words by Robert Burns, translated to German by Wilhelm Gerhard)
- Es Sitzt eine Jungfrau gefangen (A Virgin is Trapped), opus 16
- Four Lieder, opus 13 (for baritone)
- Four Lieder, opus 15
- Frühling Frühling wie bist du schön (Spring, Spring, How Beautiful You Are!)
- Ich kann's nicht fassen, nicht glauben (I Can't Grasp It, Nor Believe It)
- Lebewohl an Maria (Farewell to Maria), opus 10
- Six Lieder, opus 12 (for mezzo-soprano)
- Two Poems, opus 11
