= Regina Harris Baiocchi =

American musician and composer

Regina Baiocchi
- Born: Regina A. Harris; July 16, 1956 (age 70); Chicago, Illinois, U.S.
- Education: Roosevelt University (B.M., 1978); New York University (Certificate in Public Relations, 1991); DePaul University (M.M., 1995)
- Occupations: Musician, composer, writer, educator
- Notable work: Teeter Totter, Ghetto Child, Mama’s Will, Gbeldahoven: No One’s Child, African Hands
- Spouse: Gregory Baiocchi (m. 1975)
- Awards: Poets and Patrons Award for Poetry (1980s); McDonald's Literary Achievement Award (1988); Illinois Arts Council grant (1995); Chicago Music Association award (1995); Art Institute of Chicago grant (1997); National Endowment for the Arts Regional Artists Program grant (1997)

Regina Baiocchi (née Harris; born July 16, 1956) is an American musician, music educator, composer and writer of short stories and poetry.

== Life ==
Regina A. Harris was the third of eight children born in Chicago to Elgie Harris Jr. and Lanzie Mozelle (Belmont) Harris. She was exposed to the arts from an early age, took guitar lessons at age nine and began composing at ten. She studied music in high school and church music programs, and graduated from Roosevelt University with a Bachelor of Music degree in 1978. She continued her studies at the Illinois Institute of Technology, Northwest University, and graduated from New York University with a certificate in public relations in 1991 and from De Paul University with a Master of Music degree in 1995.

She married Gregory Baiocchi on July 12, 1975, and worked as a composer, writer, poet and high school teacher. From 1986 to 1989, she worked as an audio quality control analyst for Telaction Corporation, and from 1989 to 1994 as a public relations director for Catholic Theological Union in Chicago. After 2000, she was a lecturer at East-West University.

== Honors and awards ==
- Poets and Patrons Award for Poetry for Teeter Totter, and Ghetto Child, 1980s
- McDonald's Literary Achievement Award, for Mama's Will, 1988
- Illinois Arts Council grant, 1995
- Chicago Music Association award, 1995
- Art Institute of Chicago grant for Gbeldahoven: No One’s Child, 1997
- National Endowment for the Arts Regional Artists Program grant for African Hands, 1997

== Works ==
Baiocchi's oeuvre includes the following works:

Instrumental Music:

- African Hands concerto for hand drums and orchestra, 1997
- After the Rain for soprano saxophone, piano, bass, percussion, and drum kit,1994
- Autumn Night for solo alto flute, 1991
- Azuretta for piano, 2000
- Chassé for B♭ Clarinet and piano, 1978
- Communion for marimba, strings, and piano, 1999
- Deborah for percussion and piano, 1994
- Déjà Vu for solo piano, 1999
- Doxology for organ, 2011–12
- Equipoise by Intersection: Two Piano Etudes, 1979/1995
- Feathers, Bowties for B♭ Clarinet, percussion, cello, and piano, 2009
- Gullah Ghost Dances for cello, percussion, and piano, 2015
- HB4A for piano, bass, drums, and saxophone, 2000
- Karibu for B♭ clarinet, 2007
- Legacy for piano, 1992
- Liszten, My Husband is Not a Hat for piano, 1994/2009
- Miles Per Hour for Bb or C trumpet, 1990
- Muse for orchestra, 1997
- Orchestral Suite, 1992
- QFX for brass quintet, 1993
- Realizations for string quartet, 1979
- Sketches for piano trio, 1992
- Skins for percussion, 1997

Vocal Music

- Ask Him for voice, piano, bass, and drums, 1999
- B’Shuv Adonai for voice, violin, piano, and percussion, 1998
- Belize for voice, alto sax, and jazz combo, 2001
- Best Friends for vocal duet and piano, 1993
- Black Voices for rapper, medium voice, piano, and drums, 1992
- Bwana’s Libation for African dancers, medium voice, bass, and percussion, 1992
- Crystal Stair for vocal duet and piano, 1992
- Cycles vocal duet and piano, 1992
- Dream Weaver for voice, alto sax, piano, bass, and drums, 1997
