= Jane Sinclair Wells =

British composer and saxophonist

Jane Kathleen Sinclair Wells (born 1952) is a British composer and saxophonist. She began her studies at the junior department of the Royal College of Music, then spent five years studying music education at universities in Durham, Sussex, and Southampton. She studied composition with David Lumsdaine and Jonathan Harvey. Later, she took courses in adult education, working with the frail elderly, and making music with learning-disabled adults. Wells worked in London from 1978 to 1987, where in addition to composing, she taught adults and led music-making sessions for children for the Battersea Arts Centre and the Gemini music ensemble.

Wells moved to the north Norfolk coast in 1987 for a three-year residency as a composer/musician at a small local arts center. The residency developed into Norfolk Music Works, a community organization which Wells worked with until 1994. She then became a Lincolnshire county music worker until 1998 and established a music agency for the county called "Soundlincs." During this time, she was also a PRS Composer-in-Education.

In 2003, Wells joined the Hoofbeat Streetband with Chris Balch, Dawn Loombe, Richard Hall, and Derek Paice, playing music for accordion, percussion, saxophones, and trombone. Four years later, in 2007, Wells and Noralf Mork began codirecting the Big Heart and Soul Choir (established in 1997) in Castleacre, Norfolk. All music is taught by ear, so choir participants do not need to read music. The choir emphasizes enjoyment while singing together in a group.

Wells also works as a tutor the Natural Voice Network and for Sing Your Heart Out, a series of workshops designed to help people improve their mental health by singing for enjoyment. Initially developed for clients of Norfolk Mental Health Services, the workshops are free and open to everyone. They are supported by donations.

Her compositions include:

== Chamber ==
- Duet (piano duet; 1979)
- "Five Storyteller Studies" (oboe; 2009)

== Dance ==
- De Gas (oboe and tape; choreography by Ian Spink; 1981)
- Scattering Matrix (saxophones, tape, and keyboard; composed with Edward Pillinger; choreography by Sue MacLennan; text by Virginia Woolf and Fritjof Capra; 1985)

== Discography ==
- Occasional Music: Composers Ensemble (Metier MSV CD92043)
