= Yayoi Kitazume =

Japanese composer

Yayoi Kitazume (北爪 やよひ, Kitazume Yayoi, born 26 March 1945) is a Japanese composer. She is the daughter of the clarinettist and music pedagogue Risei Kitazume (1919–2004), who was president of the Japan Clarinet Society from 1980 to 1986, and the older sister of the composer Michio Kitazume.

== Biography ==
Kitazume graduated from the Tokyo University of the Arts and later studied with composers Yoshiro Ikeuchi and Akio Yashiro.

Her Sonatine for clarinet and piano (1971) received a favorable review in The Clarinet in 1994. Haruna Miyake described Kitazume's work as "quiet, sparse, and spatial" in 1999.
