= Martha Alter =

American classical composer

- Born: February 8, 1904; New Bloomfield, Pennsylvania
- Died: June 3, 1976 (aged 72); Newport, Pennsylvania
- Occupation(s): Concert pianist and educator
- Parent(s): David Boyd and Daisy Myrl Alter

Martha Alter (8 February 1904 – 3 June 1976) was an American pianist, music teacher and composer.

== Life and career ==
Martha Alter was born in New Bloomfield, Pennsylvania, to parents David Boyd and Daisy Myrl Alter. She graduated from Vassar College in 1925. Alter continued her studies, receiving a master's in musicology from Columbia University and a master's of music composition from Eastman School of Music, studying with Ernest Hutcheson, Rubin Goldmark, Howard Hanson and Bernard Rogers.

She taught at Vassar College from 1929-1931 and took a position teaching music at Connecticut College in 1942. She died in Newport, Pennsylvania, and her papers are housed at the Vassar College Libraries.

== Works ==
Selected compositions include:

- O Bethlehem
- Peace
- Bill George, march and song for baritone and orchestra, poem by Malcolm Cowley
- Anthony Cotnstock or A Puritan's Progress, ballet
- Groceries and Notions, drama with Gertrude Brown, book by K.K. Doughtie
