= Joan Franks Williams =

American composer (1930–2003)

- Born: Joan Franks Williams; April 1, 1930; Brooklyn, New York, U.S.
- Died: January 30, 2003 (aged 72); Seattle, Washington, U.S.

Joan Franks Williams (April 1, 1930 – January 30, 2003) was an American composer.

== Life ==
Joan Franks Williams was born in Brooklyn, on April 1, 1930 to her father, Harold Franks, and her mother. Both of her parents enjoyed classical music, leading Williams to absorb the world of classical music through piano and viola lessons and frequent attendance to live concerts and performances. She attended the High School of Music and the Arts in Manhattan and continued with music into her college studies. Williams earned a bachelor's in Music Education from the Eastman School of Music in 1952, and a Bachelor's and master's degrees from the Manhattan School of Music 1961. While still in New York, she met her future husband Irving Williams on a blind date in Manhattan; suitingly, they enjoyed a live symphonic performance followed by dinner. Joann married Irving in 1954, and moved to Seattle with her family in 1962.

In Seattle, she founded New Dimensions in Music (NDM), a non-profit organization that was one of the early and most influential promoters of new music in the Pacific Northwest. As a part of NDM she also established the first electronic music studio in Seattle. In 1971, the Williams family moved to Tel Aviv in Israel. Williams continued the NDM live concert series of contemporary concert music alongside contemporary radio broadcasting through the Israel Broadcasting Authority, making her responsible for all the contemporary chamber music radio being broadcast within the country. Within the concert series, over 150 pieces by 100 different composers were performed, as well as compositions of her own production. She represented Israel at the ISCM World Music Days in Europe four times, and served on ISCM's international jury. Having created over 30 of her own works, conducting a successful execution of the NDM concert series in Seattle and Israel, and spreading new contemporary musical works throughout Israel through the Israel Broadcasting Authority, Williams returned to Seattle in 1988. Having been diagnosed with Parkinson's, she and her husband enjoyed hiking at the coast, skiing, and being near their grandchildren. On January 30 at the age of 72, Williams died of complications from Parkinson's disease. Joan Franks Williams is survived by her husband, Irving; son David Williams, and two grandchildren, all of Seattle; and father, Harold Franks, of New York City.

== Musical background ==
With the influence of her parents, Williams took part in frequent visitations to classical performances and concerts within New York. She studied violin and piano as a child and continued her musical studies in the High School for Music and the Arts in Manhattan. Continuing to pursue music in college, she studied music education at the Eastman School of Music, ultimately earning a bachelor's degree in Music Education. Williams also obtained a Bachelor's and master's degree from the Manhattan School of Music, studying under Wayne Barlow, Vittorio Giannini, Ralph Shapey, Stefan Wolpe, Vladimir Ussachevsky, and Roman Haubenstock-Ramati. Upon moving to Seattle, she was responsible for establishing the first electronic music studio within the city and lectured at the New School of Music regarding contemporary composition, writing, and production.

== Career ==
Over the years of her contemporary music career in composition, conducting and organization of contemporary concerts in Seattle and Israel, and broadcasting of contemporary music throughout the entire country of Israel, Williams had created and performed over 30 works of her own, performed around 150 contemporary and classical pieces composed by over 100 composers and has been credited with bringing the contemporary music scene to Seattle and Israel.

Within Seattle, upon lecturing at the New School of Music and creating the first electronic music studio within the city, Williams is most renowned for creating and organizing the New Dimensions in Music concert series in Seattle; she would later continue to organize that after her move to Israel in 1971. These concert series featured both classical and contemporary performances in hopes to give audiences the experience to be a part of the contemporary shift in modern-day music composition as well as the promotion of the contemporary genre as well.

From the Oxford Press describing one of the many pieces performed at the NDM concert series in 1967: “The first event of the festival was at the same time the last in the season of New Dimensions in Music, the series with which for five years now Joan Franks Williams has made Seattle increasingly aware of the musical present. Outstanding on this occasion was Suderburg's sensitive "Entertainments for Violin and Cello," invitingly entitled Chamber Music I. Each movement, notably the second, demonstrated with unusual clarity that music does not have to have a tonic and a dominant to have a beginning, a middle, and an end. This new work held its own with the now classic songs of Webern (Op. 25) and Dallapiccola (1948). Suitable as vehicles for their performers were Wolpe's Form for Piano and Harvey Sollberger's Two Oboes Troping - the oboes are really hocketing. A strange relic, on this program, of the dead days of ready-to-serve electronics was Mario Davidovsky's Electronic Study #3, the staring stereophonic speakers checking off once more the vocabulary of the available equipment. Continuum, performed for the first time, was diverting but too elaborately staged for full appreciation of the music composed by Mrs. Williams.”

In addition to the New Dimensions in Music Concert series, Williams also initiated the Israeli Composers Plus One Concert Series during her 17 years abroad. These concert programs included music specifically written to feature audience participation; an element that had influenced her compositional works greatly. Several of her works incorporate acting, improvisation, and staging such as Shimshon Hagibor, a ‘mini comic melodrama written in 1975 (translates to Samson the Hero/the Mighty). Her 1974/1975 piece, Frogs features a recorded tape of frogs croaking in the courtyard of the Israel Philharmonic Orchestra. Williams enhanced the Israeli avant-garde at the time, not only as a radio producer, but also through her uncommon and slightly humorous interpretation of the avant-garde in her own works.

== Works ==
She wrote over thirty pieces, around twenty of them while she was in Israel. Her works include mostly chamber music, some of her most famous include:

- From Paterson (Text: William Carlos Williams)
- Kassandra (1963)
- Haiku (chamber, 1969)
- Haiku (orchestra, 1972)
- Frogs (vocal-chamber, tape, 1974)
- Samson the Hero (vocal-chamber, tape 1975)
- You too, Brutus! (mezzo solo, 1976)
- Rudolph Heinemann in Bonn (trombone, 1978)
- Sevenths to Eight (1979)
- The Love of Therese du Meun (voice, piano, viola, 1980)
- Song of Songs (1983)
- Leah (1986)

“Credited with bringing contemporary music to Seattle in the 1960s.” Making sure to include her audience members within the concert experience, she produced a performance of a sculptor building a box around audience members. The instruments featured and resembled the hammer's thud as it struck nails and the clank of wooden boards through percussive elements from wind, brass, and percussion instruments. Another composition mixed an orchestra performance with ambient sounds of the city and a bus that transported the musicians. Another, Frogs, premiered on opening night of the Northwest Chamber Orchestra in 1974. A composition in atonal style, it included frogs croaking, sung haikus and instruments.

== Awards and recognition ==
- Credited with bringing contemporary concert music and performance to Seattle and the Pacific Northwest
- Bachelor's in Music Education from the Eastman School of Music
- Bachelor's and master's degrees from the Manhattan School of Music
- Founder of the non-profit organization, New Dimensions in Music (NDM) to promote new contemporary music in Seattle and continued to pursue and promote in Israel along with the Israel Broadcasting Authority
- Established first electronic music studio in Seattle
- Credited with bringing contemporary concerts and new music to Israel and the Israeli community through NDM and the Israel Broadcasting Authority
- Represented Israel at the International Society of Contemporary Music (ISCM) World Music Days in Europe four times, and served on ISCM's international jury
