= Albena Petrovic-Vratchanska =

Luxembourgish composer and pianist (born 1965)

Albena Petrovic-Vratchanska (born 20 October 1965 in Sofia, Bulgaria) is a Bulgarian-born Luxembourgish composer, a pianist and musical pedagogue.

In 2007 she received the prestigious commission of the Cultural Year 2007 in Luxembourg and the Greater Region for the composition of "Gladius" for electric guitar and instrumental ensemble. The Cultural Commission and Madam Mayor, Mrs. Theresa Gantenbein, granted her the "Cultural Award" and also the title of merits for services rendered to the cultural life of the municipality of Hesperange on the event of Excellence Awards. In 2007 she became a Jury member of the International Composition Competition "Valentino Bucchi" in Rome, Italy, representing Luxembourg. Very active as a composer, she devotes much of her creative energy to the musical CBT and teaching of young talented children. The idea, concept and creation of the Club “Artistes en Herbe” are in large part due to her efforts. Consequently, she is President-Founder of the International Composition Competition “Artistes en Herbe” under the patronage of the Ministry of Culture of Luxembourg. Master in Musical Composition and Notation, she has been granted awards for piano, solfège, music theory, composition and musical analysis. She has taken her place among the Luxembourgish composers, and has written more than 600 works in various music genres, including 8 operas.
