= Eunice Katunda =

Eunice Katunda (also spelled Catunda) (née do Monte Lima) was a Brazilian pianist, composer, music educator, lecturer, and poet. Katunda was born in Rio de Janeiro on March 14, 1915, and died at 76 years old on August 3, 1990 in São José dos Campos.

== Education and career ==
Showing signs of being a child prodigy, Katunda began playing the piano at just two years old. She learned piano with Mima Oswald from age of 5 to 8, then with Branca Bilhar from age 9 to 12, and then with Oscar Guanabarino from age 13 to 21.

In around 1934, she moved to São Paulo where she studied piano with Marieta Lion. She started learning composition in 1942 with Camargo Guarnieri and Furio Franceschini.

In 1946 she returned to Rio de Janeiro and began her studies with Hans-Joachim Koellreutter. In her compositional studies, she was especially interested in avant-garde and modern composers and she expanded her knowledge of counterpoint, musical aesthetics, orchestration, and arrangement. During this time she worked as a concert pianist and recital performer, and was a member of the Música Viva group, founded by Koellreutter. Katunda was the group's primary pianist, and they performed on radio shows weekly. These radio programs also platformed many of her compositions, along with the compositions of several other contemporary Brazilian composers.

In the summer of 1948, Katunda traveled to Italy, along with the students of Koellreutter. While living in Europe, she learned conducting with Hermann Scherchen, and composed under the guidance of Bruno Maderna.

In 1950 she left Koellreutter's group, and moved back to Brazil. Then she dove into researching Brazilian folk music, folklore, and religion, which she studied with Pierre Verger. On top of her work in research, composition, and arranging, during this time she also taught introduction to music courses at São Paulo's Museum of Modern Art (1951–52), created and directed Musical Lloyd which was a weekly radio program on Rádio Nacional de São Paulo (1955–56), and worked as a pianist for Rádio Gazeta (1957–58).

In the 1960s she did two American tours as an instrumentalist, and was an international performer. Katunda went on to teach musicology at the University of Brasília and composition at the Rio de Janeiro Conservatory. Katunda continued to compose until 1983, with her most prolific period being the 1950s and 1960s. She could speak and write in three languages, English, French, and Italian.

== Personal life ==
Katunda's parents were Rubens do Monte Lima from Rio Grande do Sul and Maria Grauben Bomilcar, a native painter from Ceará. Her brother was Hélio do Monte Lima who was a sculptor who lived in São Paulo.

In 1934, she married a mathematician named Omar Catunda and the couple lived in São Paulo. They both used the surname Catunda until they separated in 1964 from which point she used the last name Katunda, altering the C to a K.

They had a son named Igor Catunda.

== Archival records ==
To view Katunda's archival records including a "Sheet Music Collection" and "Collection of Correspondence and Album of Newspaper and Program Clippings by the composer herself," view the website of Carlos Kater. Kater also wrote Eunice Katunda: Brazilian musician, a biography with a catalogue of her works.

== Compositional style ==
Katunda's musical style often combined serial music, 12-note technique, and Brazilian folk motives and elements. Her art engaged themes of socialism, political activism, nationalism, and was influenced by Afro-Brazilian culture. She composed in tension with both wanting her music to be accessible to the everyday listener but also enjoying the 20th century expansion of serialism. She also had to balance her identity and career as a composer with the social pressures to conform to the expected domesticity of family and motherhood.

== Performances ==
=== Katunda's performances ===
Katunda's first solo piano recital was on October 22, 1927, performed at 12 years of age. She played Branca Bilhar's Bailado Indígena and the venue was the National Institute of Music in Rio de Janeiro.

In 1941 she was the soloist of Piano Concerto No. 4, Op. 58 by Beethoven at the Theatro Municipal in São Paulo, under the baton of composer Camargo Guarnieri.

In 1944 she performed a series of concerts in Argentina which were praised by Heitor Villa-Lobos. Her programming showed her support of contemporary Brazilian composers, including performances of works by Villa-Lobos, Oscar Lorenzo Fernândez, Camargo Guarnieri, and herself.

In 1948 she played the first Italian performance of Ludus Tonalis by Paul Hindemith at the Teatro Piccolo in Milan.

==== Performances of Katunda's works ====
Premiere of Quatro Epígrafes circa 1948, performed by herself at the [1st Conference of Dodecaphonic Music], Hotel Kurhauss-Victoria, Lugano, Switzerland.

Hermann Scherchen performed "Quatro Cantos à Morte" in 1949 which was broadcast on Swiss Radio Broadcasting.

"Homenagem a Schoenberg" was performed at the 1950 International Society for Contemporary Music (ISCM) Festival.

== Works ==
=== Song cycles ===
- Canções à Maneira de Época. Text by Vinícius de Moraes
  - No. 1. Assim Como as Folhas, No. 2. O Mais Que Perfeito, No. 3. Anunciação, No. 4. O Anjo das Pernas Tortas, No. 5. Não Comerei, No. 6. O Espectro da Rosa, No. 7. Ser Subjetivo, No. 8. Refrão de Infância, No. 9. Teu Nome
- Duas Devoções Nordestinas
  - No. 1. Bom Jesus do Calvário, No. 2. Encomenda de Almas
- Duas Líricas Gregas
  - No. 1. Aóion (alternate title: Prenúncio do Sol), No. 2. Pois Que Tão Raramente (alternate title: A FlautaI)
- Due lirici di Ungaretti. Text by Giuseppe Ungaretti
  - No. 1. Sono una Creatura
- Estro Africano N.1 (Duas Cantigas das Águas). Text: Bible or other Sacred Texts
  - No. 1. Louvor de Oxum, No. 2. Louvor de Yemanjá
- Estro Romântico. Texts of No. 1 and 3 by Eunice Katunda, texts of No. 2 and 4 by Vinícius de Moraes
  - No. 1. Consciência de Ser, No. 2. O Sono da Amada, No. 3. Rosa dos Quatro Espinhos, No. 4. Dialética
- Líricas Brasileiras. Text by Mário de Andrade
  - No. 1. Moda do Corajoso, No. 2. Moda da Solidão-solitude
- Quatro Incelenças (Quatro cantigas de velório)
  - No. 1. Incelenças Dos Cravos e Rosas, No. 2. Incelenças do Anjo-Serafim, No. 3. Incelenças do Anjo do Céu, No. 4. Incelença das Ave-Marias

=== Other vocal works ===
- Estro Africano n.2 (Águas de Oxalá). Text: Bible or other Sacred Texts
- Seresta do Maior Amor. Text: Vinícius de Moraes. 1958
- Trenoda al Poeta Morto

=== Chamber works ===
- Negrinho do Pastoreio cantata for 3vv, flute, guitar, percussion, 1946
- Homenagem a Schoenberg, clarinet, viola, cello, piano, 1949
- Quintet, viola, cello, clarinet, bass clarinet, piano
- Seresta, 4 saxophones, 1956
- Cantiga de Cego, viola and piano, 1966
- Duas Serestas, guitar, 1972

=== Piano works ===
- Variações Sobre um Tema Popular, for piano, 1943
- Sonatina, 1946
- Quatro Epígrafes: I-Calmo; II- Agitato rubato; III- Grave calmo e IV- Agitato molto, 1948
- Quatro Cantos à Morte, 1948
- Estudos Folclóricos,1952
- Pianoforte Concerto, 1955
- Seresta Piracicaba, 1956
- Momento de Lorca, 1957
- Trovador Obstinado, 1958
- Quatro Momentos de Rilke, for piano, 1958
- Sonata de Louvação, 1958, revised 1967
- Seresta in A, 1967
- Três Momentos em New York, 1969
- Sonata Fúnebre, 1970
- Poemas para Carla, 1977
- Expressão Anímica, 1979
- Cantos de Macunaíma, ca. 1980s
- La Dame et La Licorne, 1982, a six-movement suite

=== Large ensemble works ===
- A Negrinha e Lemanjá, chorus, orchestra, 1955
- Cantata do Soldado Morto, chorus, small orchestra, 1965
- Cantata dos Marinheiros, chorus, orchestra, 1975
