= Helen C. Rockefeller =

American composer

Helen Claire Dietz Rockefeller (1907–1957) was an American composer of sacred music who lived in New Jersey for most of her life. She published under the name Helen C. Rockefeller.

Little is known about Rockefeller’s education. She married George C. Rockefeller and they had two daughters, Susan and Claire. In 1935, she became the Treasurer of the Rockefeller Family Association.

In 1943, Rockefeller wrote an article entitled “Musical Bingo” for The Etude, a magazine for musicians. Her music was published by H. W. Gray Co. and Westminster Press (today the Westminster John Knox Press). Her compositions, all vocal, included:

== Chorus ==
- An Easter Carol (mixed chorus and piano)
- How Far is it to Bethlehem? (mixed chorus and organ)

== Hymns ==
- God is with Me Every Day
- God Made Us a Beautiful World
- Sing a Song of Thankfulness
