= Nydia Pereyra-Lizaso =

Uruguayan composer (1920–1998)

Nydia Pereyra-Lizaso (12 May 1920 – 2 November 1998) was a Uruguayan composer, pianist, and music educator.

== Life ==
Nydia was born in Rocha, Uruguay in 1920. She studied music with Dolores Bell and Carmen Barrera at the Conservatory of Teresiano in Rocha, and in Montevideo with Wilhelm Kolischer for piano, Tomás Mujica for counterpoint and fugue and Enrique Casal-Chapí for composition. After completing her studies, she worked as a composer and taught music at the Kolischer Conservatory and at the Institute of Musical Education.

Pereyra-Lizaso's works have been performed internationally. Her Four miniatures for violin and viola won the chamber music award at GEDOK in Mannheim, 1966. She also won the Casa de Teatro stage music award in 1959, 1964, 1966, 1967 and 1978 for incidental music in plays performed by the Comedia Nacional. She has published a number of pedagogical works written for children. Pereyra-Lizaso died in November 1998 at the age of 78.

== Works ==
Pereyra-Lizaso composes mainly for chamber ensemble and vocal performance. Selected works include:

- Sarabande for piano
- Divertimento for strings
- Adagio and Allegro, clarinet, pianoforte, 1958
- Allegro and Andante, bass clarinet, pianoforte, 1965
- Four miniatures, violin, viola, clarinet, 1966
- Song about Juan Ramon Gimenez, violin, pianoforte, 1954
- 2 Songs (text C. Gómez Martínez), violin, pianoforte 1956
- 3 Songs (text E. de Cáceres), vocal or choir, 1956
- 6 Songs (text R.M. Rilke ), Mezzo-soprano, pianoforte, 1959
- 3 Songs (E. de Cáceres), Soprano, pianoforte, 1967
- Pianoforte Sonata no.1, 1955
- Sonata no. 2, 1958
- Sonatina, 1967
- 3 pieces for children, 1967
- Sonatina in G, 1963
- 2 miniatures, 1968
