= Claire Schapira =

French harpsichordist, pianist and composer

Claire Schapira (born 19 January 1946 in Paris) is a French harpsichordist, pianist and composer.

He studied piano, harpsichord, musical theater and composition, graduating from the Schola Cantorum de Paris. She was a resident at the Villa Medici in Rome and served an internship at Ircam. She received a grant from the French Ministry of Culture in 1985 to write the opera La Partition de sable. Her work has been performed internationally.

== Works ==
Selected works include:

- La Partition de sable, opera
- Trames
- Vagues
- Ténèbres
- Fragments insolites
- Le Ciel de mes yeux en pleurs
- Acheminement
- Mémorial
- Requiem pour la paix (commissioned by Radio France)
- La Chaîne (1981)
- Chant cousu (1985)
- Rumeur (1986)
- Regards (RAI National Symphony Orchestra)
- In pace
- Interjections II (Festival de Paris)
- Contes (Musica and the Salzburg Festival)
- Hymne à la paix
- Antigone
- Sans craindre le vertige et le vent'
- Chants mêlés
- Sysiphe
- Cassandre
- Stabat Mater (with the support of the Beaumarchais Foundation)
- L'Ombre de Cassandre, opera
