= Irina Elcheva =

Russian composer (1926–2013)

Irina Mikhaylovna Elcheva (Russian: Ирина Михайловна Ельчева; 28 November 1926 – 8 May 2013) was a Russian composer.

== Biography ==
Her mother, Nadezhda Bogolyubova, was also a composer, music theorist, and pianist, and her father, M.D. Yel'cheva, was a singer. She studied at Mussorgsky College with Sergey Vol′fenson during World War II and then at the Leningrad Conservatory, where she studied piano with Aleksandr Kamensky (1950) and composition with O.S. Chishko (1958). Elcheva was a member of the USSR Union of Composers, the Znanie Society, and the Union of Theatre Workers.

During the Siege of Leningrad, Elcheva remained in the city and helped to clear rubble and performed music in hospitals for the wounded. She would later earn medals for her efforts, including one "For the Defence of Leningrad" (1943) and "Veteran of Labour" (1985).

Elcheva later traveled on expeditions to collect folk songs and completed the opera Spartak in 1962. Much of her music is based on folk tunes and her experiences during wartime.

Elcheva died in St. Petersburg on 8 May 2013, at the age of 86.

== Selected works ==
=== Publications ===
- "On the Development of Musical Memory," 1953

=== Orchestral ===
- Simfoniya pamyati pogibshikh v blokadu Leningrada (Symphony in Memory of Those who Perished in the Siege of Leningrad), 1965
- Pechorskiye starinï (Times of Yore in Pechora), suite, 1963
- Piano Concerto, 1968
- Zavadskaya uvertyura (A Factory Overture), 1975
- Ivanovskaya uvertyura (Ivanovo Overture), 1977

=== Stage ===
- Spartak (Spartacus), opera, V. Chulisov, S. Tsenina, after Giovagnoli, 1961
- Skazka o lenivom bobryonke [Tale of the Lazy Beaver] (operetta, Yu. Shestalov), 1980
- Riki-Tiki-Tavi (Yel′cheva, after R. Kipling), 1985
- Alen′kiy tsvetochek (The Little Scarlet Flower) (Yel′cheva, after I. Bazhov), 1996

=== Choral ===
- Russkaya svad′ba (A Russian Wedding), 1966
- Khorovodnïye pesni (Round Songs), 1967
- K novoy zhizni (Towards a New Life) (oratorio, Yu. Shestakov), 1973
- Derevenskiye stsenki (Village Scenes), 1974
- Vesyolaya maslenitsa (A Merry Shrovetide) (G. Ufimtseva], cantata, 1986
- Vremena goda (The Seasons), 1989

=== Solo and chamber music ===
- Palekhskaya syuita (Palekh Suite) for piano, 1966
- 24 prelyudii i fugi (24 Preludes and Fugues), piano, 1969
- 5 p′yes (Five Pieces) for wind quintet, 1974

=== Vocal ===
- Ivanovskiye pesni (Ivanovo Songs), mezzo-soprano and piano, 1965
- Mï zhivyom na severe (We Live in the North), (Yu. Shestalov), baritone voice and piano, 1969
- Lebed′ belaya (White Swan) (trad.), 1979
