= Lynn Gumert =

American musician and composer (born 1961)

- Born: 1961 (age 63–64)
- Genres: Early music
- Occupations: Composer; conductor; teacher; artistic director
- Website: www.lynngumert.com

Lynn Gumert (born 1961) is an American musician and contemporary composer.

== Biography ==
Gumert studied at Indiana University School of Music in Bloomington, with Claude Baker, Eugene O'Brien, and Donald Freund, graduating with a Master of Music and Doctorate of Music. She also studied with Ellen Taafe Zwilich and Shulamit Ran, recorder with Eva Legene, Emily Samuels and Scott Reiss, and voice with Camilla Williams and Sudie Marcuse-Blatz.

After completing her education, Gumert took a position teaching Women's and Gender Studies at Rutgers University. She is artistic director of Zorzal Music Ensemble which performs Spanish and Latin American music from 12th-century to contemporary. She is currently pursuing a masters in music therapy at Montclair State University, where she received the Ott award for outstanding music therapy intern. She has one daughter, Clara.

== Works ==
Selected works include:

- Díestas aves
- Roundabout, for flute, percussion, 2 trombones, and double bass
- Milkweed, for solo voice
- Mary's Lullaby
- Quemar las naves, scored for voices, recorders, strings and percussion
