= Ellen Coleman (composer) =

English conductor and composer

- Born: 1886
- Died: 1973 (aged 86–87)
- Occupations: Composer; Conductor
- Notable work: See below
- Style: Classical

Ellen Coleman (1886–1973) was an English conductor and composer.

== Works ==
- Poem
- Cloud and Quietude
- The Conquered
- The Merry-go-round
- String Quartet
- Harpsichord Sonata
- Piano Quartet

Many of Coleman's works are published by Stainer & Bell.
