= Augusta Browne =

American composer

Augusta Browne (1820–1882) was an American composer, publisher, and writer. She started the first wave of female composers in the country. Wake, Lady Mine, written in 1845, is one of her best known works.

== Biography ==
=== Early life ===
Augusta Browne Garrett was born in 1820 in Dublin, Ireland. She was one of nine children. In June 1826 her father, David Browne, moved to Boston and opened a music academy. Augusta was known as a child prodigy, playing Dussek at the age of seven, and by age sixteen she was playing her own compositions in public. She first came to public attention through articles that appeared in Boston newspapers during October 1826 which called her a "little prodigy." She received musical instruction from both of her parents, as her mother was also a skilled pianist. The success of her Dussek performance brought attention (both positive and negative) to her father's music school, with the Boston Courier claiming "Mr. B can communicate more knowledge of the theory of music in four weeks, than some of our musical professors do in the same number of years."

In 1829, in the face of growing hostility in Boston, David moved the Browne family to Utica, New York. He opened another music academy and store, but this sojourn in Utica was short-lived; by November 1829, the family had once again relocated, this time to New York City. "Mr. Browne's Musical Academy" opened soon after at 414 Broadway. A series of lawsuits involving the veracity of other teachers' claims to be instructed in the Logierian method resulted in David's temporary imprisonment, negatively impacting the childhood of young Augusta.

Despite the controversies surrounding the Browne patriarch, Augusta made the acquaintance of leading figures in New York, including Aaron Burr. However, the family soon made yet another move, this time to Toronto, Canada (then known as York), but returned again to Boston in 1833. By March 1834, when Augusta was only fourteen, she was advertised as an instructor in her father's music school. She also studied organ during this time, although the identity of her instructor is unclear.

=== Career ===
Judith Tick notes that Browne was known as one of "the most prolific woman composer in America before 1870." She composed over 200 works for piano and voice, along with numerous hymns and secular pieces. Browne often collaborated with lyricists, creating musical settings to accompany the text.

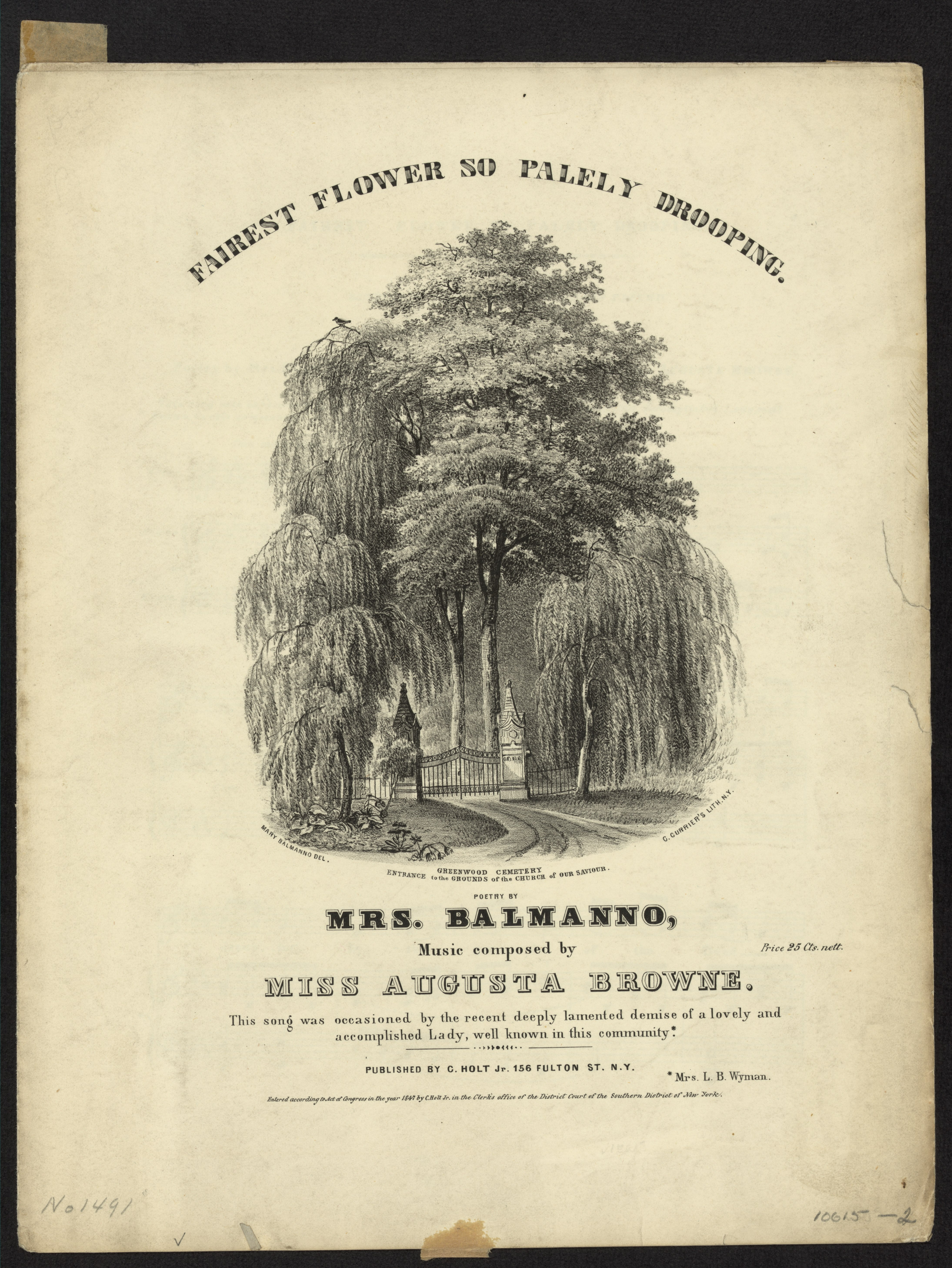
Music by Augusta Browne

In addition to her musical works, Browne published two books; The Precious Stones of the Heavenly Foundations and Hamilton, the Young Artist (written about her younger brother after his death). She also wrote numerous essays, religious tracts, poetry, and short stories. Rather than writing on issues such as home or family life, she wrote on the subjects most important to her; music, literature, the fine arts and the Christian faith. As such, she joined a small band of women writers such as Margaret Fuller.

One of Browne's most famous articles criticized the popular "minstrel music" of the mid-1800s, calling it "melodic trash." Though the opinion was controversial, her article was reprinted in several music journals.

=== Personal life ===
Browne met and married John Walter Benjamin Garrett, a portrait painter from North Carolina, in 1855. He died in 1858 and the couple had no surviving children.

Browne died on January 11, 1882, and was buried in Green-Wood Cemetery, New York.

=== Legacy ===
The first full length biography of Browne, by Bonny H. Miller, was published in 2020 by University of Rochester Press.

== Selected works list ==
=== Chamber music ===
- A Song for New England for voice and piano (1844)

=== Choral Music ===
- Advent Hymn for SATB and piano (1880)

== Notes ==
- Chase, Gilbert (1992). America's Music, from the Pilgrims to the Present (illustrated, revised ed.). University of Illinois Press. pp. 160-161. ISBN 9780252062759.
- Neuls-Bates, Carol (December 1978). "Sources and Resources for Women's Studies in American Music: A Report". Notes. Second Series. 35 (2). Music Library Association: 269–283. doi:10.2307/939679. JSTOR 939679.
- Tick, Judith (1983). American women composers before 1870. Issue 57 of Studies in musicolog (illustrated ed.). UMI Research Press. p. 150.
