= María Dolores Malumbres =

Spanish pianist and composer (1931–2019)

María Dolores Malumbres Carranza (11 April 1931 – 5 January 2019) was a Spanish pianist, music educator and composer.

== Life ==
María Dolores Malumbres was born in Alfaro, La Rioja. She first studied music with her violinist father Jose Luis Malumbres and in Cordoba in 1948. She later studied with Fernando Remacha at the Madrid Royal Conservatory of Music, and at the Zaragoza Conservatory of Music.

After completing her studies, Malumbres began to work as a choir director and to teach music privately. From 1984–87 she taught harmony and analysis at the Music Conservatory of Logroño. She began to compose in 1953, and the next year premiered her String Quartet. She also taught at Pablo Sarasate Conservatory of Music in Pamplona.

Malumbres married and raised a family, then again studied music for 1980-87 with Carmelo Bernaola, Luis de Pablo, Luigi Nono, Pedro Espinosa, Agustín González and Albert Sarda Acilu. Malumbres is a member of the Association of Women in Music, and her works have been performed internationally. Her biography was published in 2009: Ruiz, Blanco, C., The music keys Dolores Malumbres M.

== Works ==
Selected works include:

- Divertimento in D, for Violoncello solo (2007)
- Divertimento in C, for Violoncello solo (2008)
- Dialogues (1988)
- Bubbles, four pieces for guitar (1996)
- Colors (1997)
- Mosaics, four pieces for flute, guitar and cello (2002–03)
- Evocation (2006)
