= Diana Pereira Hay =

Danish pianist and composer (born 1932)

Diana Pereira Hay (born 20 February 1932) is a Danish pianist and composer. Hay was born in Sri Lanka of an Australian father and Sri Lankan mother of part Irish descent. She studied music at the Royal Danish Academy of Music in Copenhagen from 1953–60, learning piano, theory, music history, composition and orchestration. After she completed her studies, she worked as a composer through grants from the National Arts Foundation.

== Works ==
Diana Pereiera Hay composes mainly for piano solo and four-part choir. Selected works include:

- I'm still alive, piano solo (1982)
- Sonata No. 2, piano solo (1979)
- Sonata No. 3, piano solo (1979)
