= Michio Kitazume =

Japanese composer and conductor (born 1948)

- Born: February 12, 1948; Japan Tokyo
- Other name: 北爪 道夫
- Occupations: violinist, composer
- Relatives: father:Risei Kitazume (clarinetist)
- Website: Official site

Michio Kitazume (北爪 道夫 Kitazume Michio, born February 12, 1948, in Tokyo, Japan) is a Japanese composer and conductor.

== Biography ==
Michio Kitazume was born in Tokyo. He studied at Tokyo University of the Arts.

== Works ==
=== Orchestral ===
- Ei-sho (1993), The 42nd Otaka Prize, '95 International Rostrum of Composers Grand Prix
- From the beginning of the sea (1999)
- Scene of the earth (2000), The 49th Otaka Prize
- Song is always there

=== Concerto ===
- Side by side for perc solo and orchestra (1987)
- Clarinet concerto (2002)
- Concerto for orchestra (2003)
- Cello Concerto

=== Chamber music ===
- Oasis for flute, violin and piano (1972)
- Slapping Crossing for bass clarinet and percussion (1976)
- Stream III for percussion ensemble (2007)

=== Solo ===
- Shadows IIIa for percussion (1976)
- Shadows IIIb for percussion (1977)
- Shadows IV for clarinet (1977)
- Side by side (percussion solo version) (1977)
- Renga for clarinet (1996)
- Blue Cosmic Garden I (1984), II (2006) for guitar

=== Piano music ===
- Distances for piano (2006)
- Secret Folk Song for piano (2006)

=== Wind orchestral ===
- Festa (1991)
- Secret Song (2004)
- Fanfare in the Forest (2005)
- Stream II (2007)
- Narabi yuku tomo (2008)
- Kumo no ue no sanpomichi (2009)
- Metamorphosis of Clouds (2009)

=== Mandolin orchestral ===
- Canto (1997)
- Blue Cosmic Garden III

=== Choral music ===
- "Saru" suit (1983)
- The Sea (1999)
- Kaita's Garance (2001)
- Mawaru-Uta (2003)
- Odeon (2004)
- Kotoba-Asobi-Uta-Mata (2004)
- Man'you-no-uta
- Words Play Songs (2001)

=== Tape music ===
- Reincarnation (1982)
