= Susanna Nerantzi =

Greek pianist and composer

Susanna Nerantzi (Greek: Σουζάνα Νεράντζη; fl. 1830–1840) was a Greek pianist and composer, perhaps born in Zakynthos, Greece. She is the earliest recorded modern Greek female composer. She studied piano and composition in Corfu under Nikolaos Mantzaros and composed works which were published by Francesco Lucca of Milan in 1839.

Some of her works are exhibited in the Music Museum of the Philharmonic Society of Corfu.

== Works ==
Selected works include:

- Les souvenirs (op.26)
- Fantasia sulla romanza 'Il lago di Como' (op.27)
- Regret pour la patrie (op.28)
