= Sylvia Pengilly =

British-American musician and music professor (1935–2025)

- Born: March 23, 1935; London, England
- Died: December 11, 2025 (aged 90); Los Angeles, California, U.S.
- Occupations: Composer and professor
- Known for: Electronic music

Sylvia Pengilly (March 23, 1935 – December 11, 2025) was a British-American musician and music professor. She was known for composing music by converting brain waves to electrical data that combines music with graphics. Pengilly continued lecturing and composing after semi-retiring in 1995.

== Career ==
A screenshot of one of Pengilly's compositions

After completing her studies, she taught theory and composition at Western Illinois University for four years. She learned that Lissajous curves could be created with the use of a combined laser and mirror system built by physics professor Richard Peterson. She used the system to compose percussion and electronic music.

Pengilly taught at Loyola University New Orleans from 1980 to 1995 where she was hired to expose students to electronic music. She built a music studio for the students which included a Moog 55, speakers, mixing board, TASCAM tape deck, and a Zenith computer. In 1984, Pengilly added Macintosh computers that ran composition software and included keyboards. She also worked on the integration of graphics with music and herself dancing by using an Amiga computer that was running a software named Mandala. This software allowed her "to create a virtual world, then to have her image enter that world, where it is able to trigger 'events' in realtime by virtually touching previously created icons".

Pengilly worked on the use of brain waves to create compositions in 1983 with an Interactive Brainwave Visual Analyzer. The visual analyzer contains a headband with electrodes that converts brain waves to electrical data. The data is transferred to a computer's receiver through radio frequencies and then converted to MIDI information, later controlling the composition by combining music with graphics that match a performer's brain waves.

== Personal life and death ==
Sylvia Pengilly was born in London on March 23, 1935. Pengilly's childhood memories include gunfire, rockets, and bombings. Her family would travel to rural Sussex whenever the bombings would be at their worst, except for her father who was in the army. She attended music class each week while in Sussex. She learned about English folk music and her teacher would play the piano to accompany the music. Once the war ended, the entire family moved back to London, where her parents taught her how to play the piano. She enjoyed playing so much that she would often need to be forced away from it. At music class in high school, she was first exposed to a fugue by Bach. This led to her first composition, a fugue based on the C minor fugue from Book I of The Well-Tempered Clavier. She attended the Guildhall School of Music and Drama in the 1950s and took a degree in music education.

Pengilly married Brian Pengilly, a research chemist, in 1956 and they moved to Stow, Ohio in 1957 when he received a job offer from Goodyear Research. Pengilly was an elementary school music teacher for a few years until she pursued a composition degree at Kent State University in 1968. Pengilly became aware of electronic music while attending the university when she saw the chairman's Moog 55 and she used it to change how a simple waveform sounds. She graduated with a Master of Arts in composition in 1971 and joined the faculty at Kent State University as a theory instructor. Pengilly divorced her husband in 1973 and attended the University of Cincinnati for a doctoral degree during the same year. The University of Cincinnati's Conservatory of Music had an electronic music studio which included an ARP 2600 and an ElectroComp. She studied how to compose acoustic and electronic music.

Pengilly became semi-retired in 1995 and moved to California. She continued to perform and lecture at multiple universities. Pengilly also attended electronic music conferences. She collaborated with composer Michael Rhoades to create music video works, with Pengilly creating the video and Rhoades composing the music.

Pengilly died on December 11, 2025, at the age of 90.

== Reception ==
A 2005 review in Computer Music Journal states that Pengilly's work Patterns of Organic Energy "demonstrates a wide and inventive range of constantly evolving aqueous and kaleidoscopic forms". A review from the Center for Visual Music, Los Angeles states, "Sylvia Pengilly's Patterns of Organic Energy is a gorgeous work, containing some literal translations of image to music, made using Artmatic Pro and MetaSynth".

A review from the Miami Herald music critic James Roos says, "Sylvia Pengilly's Trio of 1979, though composed in four movements, ranging from Fugue and Lullaby to Scherzo and Epilogue, had a consistently acrid sound and a texture so fragmented it required a conductor to keep violin, viola and piano together, as they pulled in their own directions".
