= Edgar Allan Poe in television and film =

American poet and short story writer Edgar Allan Poe has had significant influence in television and film. Many are adaptations of Poe's work, others merely reference it.

== Film ==
=== Adaptations ===
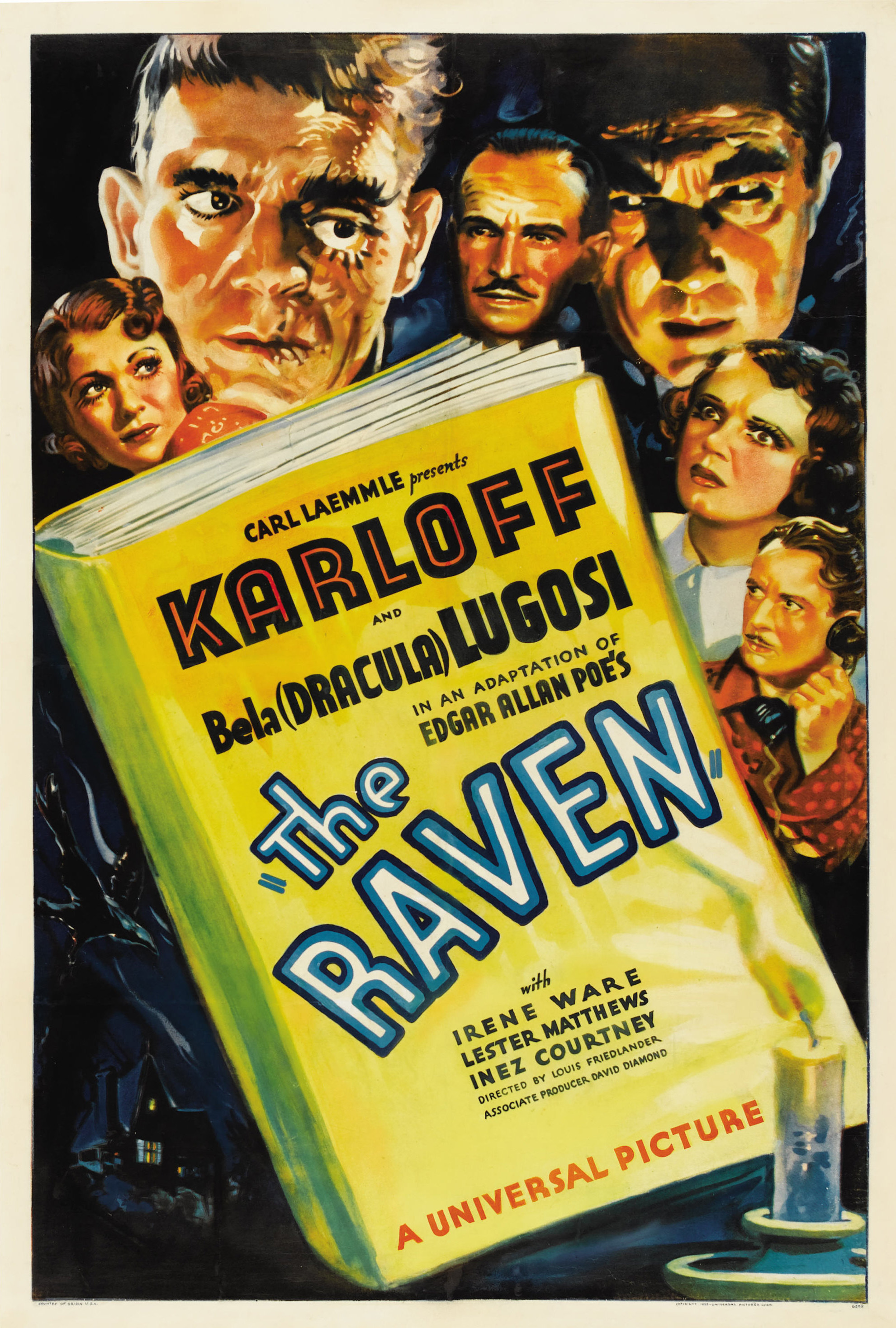
The Raven (1935), starring Boris Karloff and Bela Lugosi

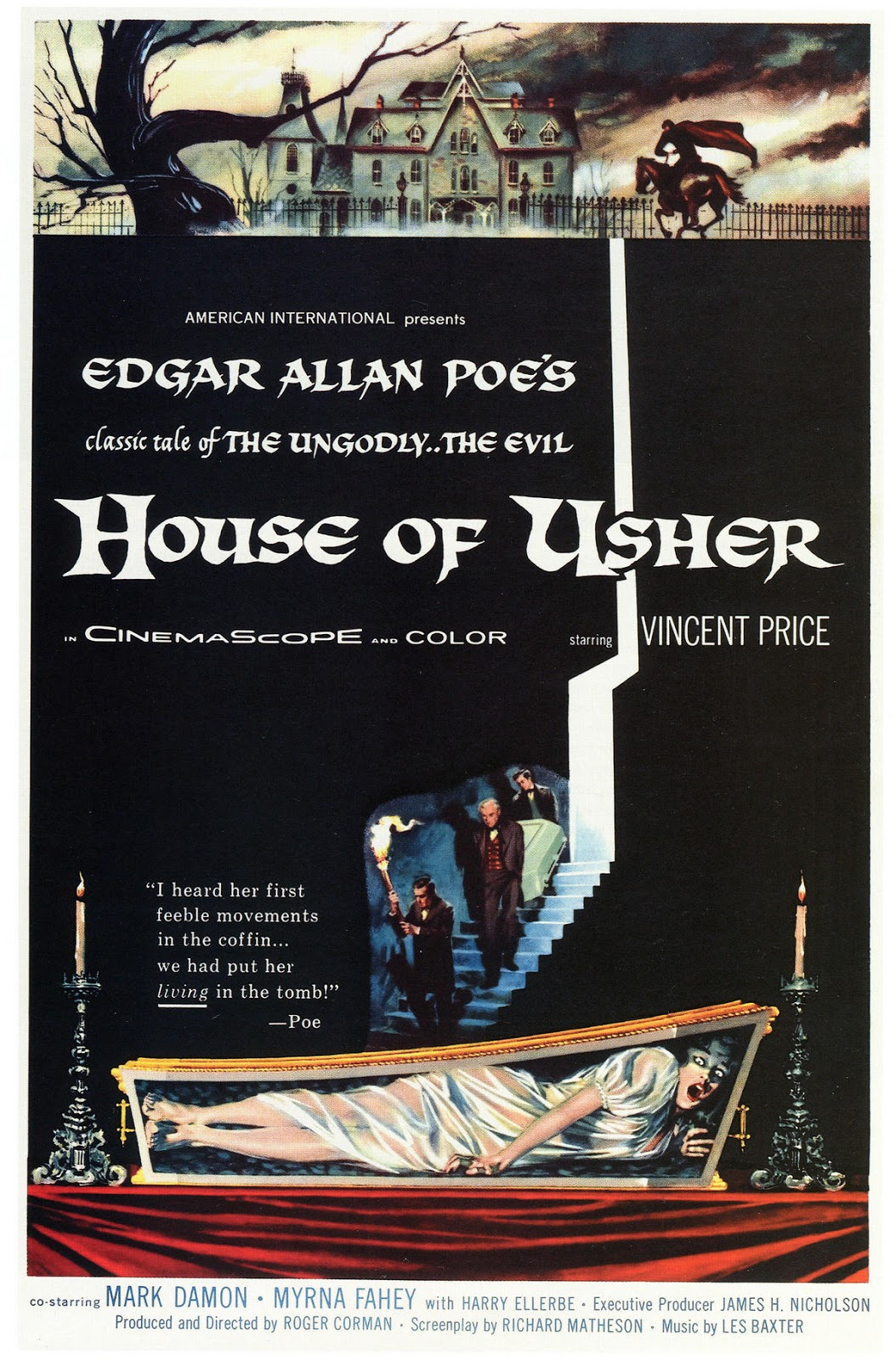
House of Usher (1960), directed by Roger Corman

- In the 1930s and 1940s, Universal Studios adapted several Poe stories—and used others as inspirational jump-off points—primarily starring Bela Lugosi and Boris Karloff. These films are usually treated as forming part of the early Universal Monster films, alongside Karloff's Frankenstein and Lugosi's Dracula et al.
- The educational film The Strange Case of the Cosmic Rays, directed by Frank Capra in 1957, contains a brief scene in which Poe, Fyodor Dostoyevsky, and Charles Dickens appear as marionettes.
- Perhaps most well known are the films directed by Roger Corman and starring Vincent Price such as House of Usher, the first in the series. The following movie, The Pit and the Pendulum (1961), was loosely inspired by the short story of the same name, mostly in the climax. The Premature Burial (1962, starred Ray Milland and Hazel Court, with Price notably absent for the only time in the unofficial "Corman-Poe Cycle". The Haunted Palace (1963) adopts the title of Poe's poem, but is more closely derived from the works of H. P. Lovecraft, in particular The Case of Charles Dexter Ward. Corman hoped to remove himself from Poe adaptations and turned The Raven into a comedic effort. Likewise, the middle segment in Tales of Terror, based on "The Black Cat" and "The Cask of Amontillado", is intended to be humorous. The Masque of the Red Death (1964) was based on both that short story by Poe and "Hop-Frog". The Tomb of Ligeia (1964) closed the cycle out.
- "The Black Cat" was translated to giallo film as Your Vice Is a Locked Room and Only I Have the Key (also known as Eye of the Black Cat).
- In 1973, Mexican director Juan López Moctezuma made The Mansion of Madness, also known as "La Mansión de la Locura", or "Dr. Tarr's Torture Dungeon".
- In 1981, Italian filmmaker Lucio Fulci directed The Black Cat, starring Patrick Magee and Mimsy Farmer.
- In 2005, Lurker Films released an Edgar Allan Poe film collection on DVD, including short film adaptations of "Annabel Lee" by director George Higham, "The Raven" by director Peter Bradley, and "The Tell-Tale Heart" by director Alfonso S. Suarez.
- The 2004 release of Hellboy on DVD contained a special 10-minute adaptation of "The Tell-Tale Heart" in the special features.
- Since 2004 New York animation producer Michael Sporn has been working on Poe, an animated feature about Poe's life and works.
- Independent Animation Artist John Schnall's lengthy short film adaptation The Fall of the House of Usher (1984) is entirely hand-drawn and rendered in wax crayon. The film successfully embodies an entirely Gothic spirit, down to the black rings around the characters' eyes. The adaptation was included on his 2025 Blu-ray collection Death Laughs Among Us: Films by John Schnall released by VHSHitfest.
- Czech Surrealist director and animator Jan Švankmajer has directed several Poe-related adaptations: The Fall of the House of Usher (1983), a short film based on the story of the same name, The Pit, the Pendulum and Hope (1983), another short film based on "The Pit and the Pendulum" by Poe and "A Torture by Hope" by Villiers de l'Isle Adam, and Lunacy (2005), a feature-length film based partially on motifs from "The Premature Burial" and "The System of Doctor Tarr and Professor Fether," as well as the life and writings of the Marquis de Sade.
- 2011 – Edgar Allan Poe's The Cask of Amontillado starring David JM Bielewicz and Frank Tirio, Jr., directed by Thad Ciechanowski, and produced by Joe Serkoch. Production Company DijitMedia, LLC/Orionvega. Winner of a 2013 Emmy Award.
- 2013 – Contos do Edgar (Edgar Tales) – A five-episode miniseries produced for FOX Brasil
- 2014 – "Terroir", starring Keith Carradine, is based on Edgar Allan Poe's "The Cask of Amontillado".
- 2015 – Edgar Allan Poe's The Raven starring David JM Bielewicz, Dave Pettitt and Nicole Beattie. Directed by Thad Ciechanowski, produced by Joe Serkoch. Production Company DijitMedia, LLC/Orionvega. Winner of a 2015 Emmy Award.
- Extraordinary Tales, an animated anthology of five stories adapted from Poe ("The Fall of the House of Usher", "The Tell-Tale Heart", "The Facts in the Case of M. Valdemar", "The Pit and the Pendulum", and "The Masque of the Red Death"), released in October 2015. Each story is narrated by a different actor; the voice cast includes Christopher Lee ("Usher"), Bela Lugosi ("Tell-Tale Heart"), Julian Sands ("Valdemar"), Guillermo del Toro ("Pendulum"), and Roger Corman ("Masque"). Directed by Raul Garcia.
- "Edgar Allan Poe: Buried Alive" is a 90-minute PBS documentary that premiered on October 30, 2017. The film seeks to dispel myths about Poe and describes his actual life and writings, including his Eureka: A Prose Poem (1848), which anticipated the Big Bang theory of the universe.
- Huayi Brothers Media and CKF Pictures in China announced in 2017 plans to produce a film of Akira Kurosawa's posthumous screenplay of "The Mask of the Red Death" for 2020.

=== Inspiration and allusions ===
- In the 1909 novel The Phantom of the Opera, as well as subsequent film and stage adaptations, the title character appears disguised as The Red Death at a ball.
- In Chapter 4 of the 1940 movie serial Drums of Fu Manchu, "The Pendulum of Doom", the hero Allan Parker is trapped in a "Pit and the Pendulum" peril (Fu Manchu actually states that the Poe story inspired this torture device).
- In 1994 film The Crow, Eric Draven (Brandon Lee) quotes an excerpt from "The Raven" while breaking into Gideon's Pawn Shop.
- In the 1966 Batman movie, Bruce Wayne (Adam West) quotes the last stanza from the poem, "To One in Paradise", but mistakes it as the first one.
- In François Truffaut's 1966 film Fahrenheit 451, based on Ray Bradbury's dystopian novel Fahrenheit 451, former fireman Guy Montag is shown choosing to save and memorize a collection titled Tales of Mystery & Imagination.
- Poe's poem "A Dream Within a Dream" is frequently alluded to in the film Picnic at Hanging Rock (1975), directed by Peter Weir.
- In the 1983 film The Dead Zone, the character Chris Stuart reads excerpts from the second and sixteenth stanzas of "The Raven".
- In the 1989 horror film, I, Madman, insane novelist Malcolm Brand is the author of a novel called Much of Madness, More of Sin, a quote from Poe's poem "The Conqueror Worm".
- In the 1990 film The Krays, the schoolyard dominance of Ronnie and Reggie Kray as children is demonstrated in a scene featuring a reading of the poem "Alone".
- In the 1987 vampire film The Lost Boys, the two kid vampire hunters Edgar and Alan Frog, played by Corey Feldman and Jamison Newlander, respectively, have names that are inspired by Edgar Allan Poe.
- The 1993 film The Mummy Lives, starring Tony Curtis with a screenplay by Nelson Gidding, was suggested by Poe's "Some Words with a Mummy" (1845).
- The concept of sealing someone alive behind a brick wall, "a la Poe" in "The Cask of Amontillado", was used in the September 22, 1971, episode of Rod Serling's TV series Night Gallery, titled "The Merciful". The episode included a short segment in which an old woman (Imogene Coca) is apparently sealing her husband (King Donavan), passively seated in an old chair, in the basement behind a brick wall she is building. She assures him it is "really much better this way," that she is "doing this for your own good." When she finishes the wall, the old man gets up and walks upstairs to the main floor of the house. His wife has sealed herself in.
- In the 2004 remake of The Ladykillers, the chief protagonist is a great admirer of Poe and frequently quotes from his poetry; a raven is also featured.
- In the 2008 horror film Saw V, Seth Baxter is placed in a trap which references The Pit and the Pendulum.
- Tell-Tale (2009) is inspired by "The Tell-Tale Heart". Directed by Michael Cuesta and stars Josh Lucas, Lena Headey, and Brian Cox.
- In the animated feature "The Scapegoats" (2013) by Tor E. Steiro, on the wall of Snakebite Dana's bathroom, there is an Edgar Allan Poe poster, with a raven and a quote from the poem, as well as Poe's signature.
- The 2022 supernatural horror film Raven's Hollow, a Shudder original written and directed by Christopher Hatton, tells a fictional tale of five West Point cadets, one of them Edgar Allan Poe, who embark on a training exercise in upstate New York where they encounter a gruesome situation in a forgotten community.
- The 2022 thriller film The Pale Blue Eye features a fictionalized version of Edgar Allan Poe helping to solve a murder mystery.

=== Selected Poe-related films ===
Edgar Allen Poe (1909)

- Edgar Allen Poe [sic] (1909), directed by D. W. Griffith
- The Gold Bug (France, 1910)
- The Pit and the Pendulum (Italy, 1910)
- The Bells (1912)
- The Avenging Conscience or: 'Thou Shalt Not Kill' (1914)
- The Murders in the Rue Morgue (1914)
- The Raven (1915) – this film is more of a Poe biography; however, a brief segment of the film is indeed an abbreviated performance of the namesake poem.
- The Tell Tale Heart (1928)
- The Fall of the House of Usher (US, 1928)
- La Chute de la maison Usher (France, 1928)
- Murders in the Rue Morgue (1932)
- The Black Cat (1934)
- Maniac (1934) – also adapts "The Black Cat"
- The Crime of Dr. Crespi (1935) from "The Premature Burial"
- The Raven (1935)
- The Tell-Tale Heart (1941)
- The Loves of Edgar Allan Poe (1942) (a movie biography of Poe)
- The Mystery of Marie Roget (1942)
- The Raven (1942) - Animated cartoon produced by Fleischer studio.
- The Tell-Tale Heart (1953), Animated cartoon produced by UPA
- Phantom of the Rue Morgue (1953)
- House of Usher (1960)
- The Tell-Tale Heart (1960)
- Pit and the Pendulum (1961)
- Premature Burial (1962)
- Tales of Terror (1962) – adapts "Morella", "The Black Cat", "The Cask of Amontillado" and "The Facts in the Case of M. Valdemar"
- The Raven (1963)
- The Masque of the Red Death (1964)
- Castle of Blood (1964)
- The Pit and the Pendulum (1964)
- The Tomb of Ligeia (1965)
- The Black Cat (1966)
- The Blood Demon (1967)
- Spirits of the Dead (Histoires extraordinaires), three segments: Metzengerstein by Roger Vadim, William Wilson by Louis Malle and Toby Dammit by Federico Fellini (France/Italy, 1968)
- Web of the Spider (1971)
- Murders in the Rue Morgue (1971)
- The Spectre of Edgar Allan Poe (1974) – Directed by Mohy Quandour. With Robert Walker Jr., Cesar Romero, Tom Drake.
- The Gold Bug (1980) – an episode of the TV series ABC Weekend Special, directed by Robert Fuest. With Roberts Blossom, Geoffrey Holder and Anthony Michael Hall.
- Vincent (1982) – a short film by Tim Burton about a boy who is obsessed with Poe and Vincent Price
- Masque of the Red Death (1989) – Directed by Larry Brand and produced by Roger Corman. With Adrian Paul and Patrick Macnee.
- Fool's Fire (1992) – a short film written and directed by Julie Taymor and starring Michael J. Anderson, an adaptation of "Hop-Frog"
- The Raven...Nevermore (1999)
- The Raven (short film – 2003)
- The Death of Poe (2006)
- Nightmares from the Mind of Poe (2006)
- The Light-house (2008)
- Eureka: The Mind Of Edgar Allan Poe (2008)
- Edgar Allan Poe's Ligeia (2008)
- House of Usher (2008), a queer pastiche directed by David DeCoteau
- The Pit and the Pendulum (2009), a contemporary riff directed by David DeCoteau
- William Wilson (2011) – a short film directed by Michael Van Devere
- The Raven (2012) is a fictionalized account of the last days of Poe's life.
- Stonehearst Asylum (2014) is loosely based on "The System of Doctor Tarr and Professor Fether".
- Extraordinary Tales (2015) - An animated anthology film consisting of five segments: "Fall of the House of Usher" narrated by Christopher Lee, "The Telltale Heart" narrated by Bela Lugosi, "The Facts in the Case of M. Valedar" narrated by Julian Sands, "The Pit and the Pendulum" narrated by Guillermo del Toro, and "Masque of the Red Death" featuring Roger Corman as Prince Prospero.

=== Other ===
- Poe's "The Cask of Amontillado" has been animated as a brickfilm by Canadian animator Logan Wright. It can be found online here
- "The Cask of Amontillado" was also made into a live action film, directed by British director and animator, Mario Cavalli and starring Anton Blake as Montresor and Patrick Monckton as Fortunato, in 1998
- Toby Keith's music video to "A Little Too Late" produced by Show Dog National is a modern adaptation of Poe's "Cask of Amontillado" with a twist ending.
- North Hollywood sketch comedy group Dynamite Kablammo visited Edgar Allan Poe's work with an elaborate spoof of "The Cask of Amontillado" where Montressor unwittingly buries Fortunato in the confines of an adjacent dance club. The footage of the short has unfortunately been lost because of a fire in mid-2008.

== Television ==
- The unaired 1995 TV series Edgar Allan Poe's Tales of Mystery & Imagination (based largely on the stories collected under the same name) adapted 11 tales in 12 episodes. Produced by Dark Sky Productions and adapted for the screen by Hugh Whysall, the series was introduced by Christopher Lee.
- An episode of Mr. Peabody & Sherman had the time-travelers visiting Poe. They were shocked to find Poe writing Winnie the Pooh, and Sherman insisted he should write horror stories. "I've tried," Poe tells them. "But all my stories have happy endings!" Sherman suggests taking Poe to a haunted house for inspiration.
- Gothic soap opera Dark Shadows (1966-1971), incorporated four of Poe's stories into its narrative over the course of its five-year run. These were: "The Premature Burial", "The Tell-Tale Heart", "The Cask of Amontillado" and "The Pit and the Pendulum".
- In the Beetleborgs Metallix episode "Poe and the Pendulum", the ghost of Edgar Allan Poe arrives at Hillhust Mansion seeking inspiration for a new book. Throughout the episode he tortures the tenants by subjecting them to the same gruesome fates as the characters in his past stories such as "The Black Cat", "The Pit and the Pendulum", and "The Premature Burial".
- In "Poe Pourri", an episode of the cartoon Beetlejuice, the ghost of Edgar Allan Poe mourns for his lost Lenore, tossing money everywhere as it proves worthless without her; Beetlejuice takes advantage of the situation by offering the writer lodgings at his roadhouse until he finds Lenore, in the process collecting the discarded cash for himself. But as Poe stays with him, Beetlejuice suffers from nightmares based on some of Poe's stories, including "The Raven", "The Masque of the Red Death", "The Pit and the Pendulum", and "The Murders in the Rue Morgue".
- In Boy Meets World, in the season one episode "The Fugitive" Cory hides Shawn in his bedroom because he threw a cherry bomb in a mailbox. In class, Mr. Feeney reads "The Tell-Tale Heart", causing Cory to shout, "I did it!"
- In the CSI: Crime Scene Investigation episode "Up in Smoke" the case is referred to as a Poe story, combining both "The Tell-Tale Heart" and "The Cask of Amontillado".
- The Histeria! episode "Super Writers" featured a caricature of Poe modeled and voiced like Peter Lorre in two different sketches. The first one has Poe pitching "The Raven" to Sammy Melman, becoming frustrated with Melman's suggestions that the narrator be in a happy mood and that the raven be replaced with a bunny; this eventually causes Poe to storm out and publish his poem independently. The other sketch depicts Poe as a villain who, along with the aforementioned raven as his sidekick and Sappho and Basho as his minions, vandalizes all the literature in the Library of Congress; their plans are foiled, however, when Loud Kiddington alerts the Super Writers, who then arrive to stop them.
- The television show Homicide: Life on the Street, set in Baltimore, made reference to Poe and his works in several episodes. Poe figured most prominently in the 1996 episode "Heartbeat", in which a Poe-obsessed killer walls up his victim in the basement of a house to imitate the grisly murder of Fortunato by Montresor in "The Cask of Amontillado". In a disturbing scene near the end of the episode, the killer reads from the works of Poe as a dramatic effect to increase the tension.
- In the Masters of Horror season two episode, "The Black Cat", directed by Stuart Gordon and written by Dennis Paoli and Stuart Gordon, has Poe as played by Jeffrey Combs, out of ideas and short on cash, tormented by a black cat that will either destroy his life or inspire him to write one of his most famous stories.
- Warner Bros. TV, Lin Pictures, and ABC were developing a pilot TV show called Poe, a crime procedural following Edgar Allan Poe (played by Chris Egan), the world's very first detective, as he uses unconventional methods to investigate dark mysteries in 1840s Boston. Poe's girlfriend and muse Sarah is played by Tabrett Bethell. The pilot was filmed in Toronto in March 2011 (March 14 to March 31). The project ultimately did not move forward.
- In the TV series Ruby Gloom, the character Poe, a poet crow, and his brothers Edgar & Allan; if their names are unite, form the name of Edgar Allan Poe; In some occasions, Poe is also fond of claiming, he says be a descendant of Paco, Edgar Allan Poe's pet budgie.
- In the season 4 Sabrina The Teenage Witch episode "The Phantom Menace" (1999), Hilda and Zelda and invite Edgar Allan Poe (played by Edgar Allan Poe IV) to celebrate Halloween with them.

"The Raven" as depicted by The Simpsons

- The Simpsons has made several references to Poe's works. The original "Treehouse of Horror" episode contains a segment in which James Earl Jones reads Poe's poem "The Raven", with Homer playing the narrator, Marge making a brief cameo appearance as Lenore, and Bart as the raven. The poem is presented verbatim, though a few lines are cut, and Poe is credited as te co-writer of the segment (alongside Sam Simon). "Lisa's Rival" features Lisa competing against a girl who recreates a scene from "The Tell-Tale Heart".
- Edgar Allan Poe was featured on the show Time Squad in the episode "Every Poe Has a Silver Lining," first aired on September 21, 2001. The episode shows Poe as a happy, optimistic, and care-free man. This causes his poetry to be extremely joyful, something the main characters find disgusting. The characters attempt to depress Poe by showing him grim images of humanity's struggle for survival. Poe responds to all of these attempts with uplifting comments and jubilant decoration. This frustrates the characters into giving up. Poe bakes them a cake to cheer them up, which the characters Tuddrussell and Larry 3000 criticize very harshly. This causes Poe an immense amount of sorrow and anger, and transforms him into a depressed individual. As he leaves, a raven flies in out of nowhere and perches on his shoulder.
- In the episode "Fallen Arches" of The Venture Bros. television series, the Monarch recites a stanza from "The Pit and the Pendulum" as a prostitute is making her way beneath a row of swinging axes. Poe appears in several scenes in episode 17 "Escape to the House of Mummies Part II". Brock Samson puts Edgar Allan Poe in a headlock, apparently out of amusement over Poe's large head. Just as abruptly, Poe travels to the present day with Hank Venture, Dean Venture, and Brock.
- In the Castle episode "Vampire Weekend", Richard Castle hosts a Halloween party dressed as Poe, with a raven doll on his shoulder. After Kate Beckett plays a trick on him to avenge an earlier insult by Castle (rather than performing the avenging actions described in "The Cask of Amontillado"), Castle hands her the raven, saying, "I'm giving you the bird." In later episode "He's Dead, She's Dead", Castle reveals that his middle name, Edgar, is a reference to Poe (Castle having changed his name from 'Richard Alexander Rodgers' to 'Richard Edgar Castle' when he began his writing career).
- In The Following, an American television series that tells the story of a cult of serial killers, the murders committed reflect the life and works of Poe, due to the cult's obsession with his literature.
- On October 6, 2021, it was announced that Intrepid Pictures would produce an eight-episode limited series titled The Fall of the House of Usher for Netflix based on the works of Edgar Allan Poe. Mike Flanagan and Michael Fimognari would each direct four episodes and executive produce the series. The series premiered on October 12, 2023.

== See also ==
For his influence on other media:

- Edgar Allan Poe and music

For his appearances as a fictional character:

- Edgar Allan Poe in popular culture
