= The Last Mystery of Edgar Allan Poe: The Troy Dossier =

1978 novel by Manny Meyers

- First edition
- Author: Manny Meyers
- Language: English
- Genre: Mystery novel
- Publisher: J.B. Leppencotte Company
- Publication date: 1978
- Publication place: United States
- Media type: Print (Hardback & Paperback)

The Last Mystery of Edgar Allan Poe: The Troy Dossier, is a novel written by Manny Meyers, first published in 1978 by the J.B. Lippencotte Company. It was released as a mass market paperback under the title The Troy Dossier by BMI books in 1986.

The novel concerns Hollis Beckwith, the superintendent of the nascent New York City Police Department (established in 1845) enlisting the aid of Edgar Allan Poe to solve a pair of murders in 1846. The story is filled with sex and violence, and attempts to stay true to the character and known history of Poe. The plot concerns an attempt to overthrow the United States government.

The novel is one of the earliest to engage the historical Edgar Allan Poe as a protagonist in a detective novel. Poe is considered to be the inventor of the classic tropes of detective fiction with his character C. Auguste Dupin, so it is natural that writers would utilize him in their fictions, especially given the recent rise of the historical novel. Many other writers have done this, including Louis Bayard in The Pale Blue Eye and true crime writer Harold Schechter in a series of novels.

== Critical reaction ==
Allen J. Hubin commented that, although the story itself is not impressive, the character of Poe and the "ambiance of mid-nineteenth century New York" are.

Linda Grist Crewe, writing in the Daily Record, thought that while the novel was "readable, and even enjoyable in spots" it ultimately failed to deliver on the promise of its premise.

== See also ==
- Edgar Allan Poe in popular culture - other works with Poe as a fictional character
