= Edgar Allan Poe in popular culture =

Edgar Allan Poe has appeared in popular culture as a character in books, comics, film, and other media. Besides his works, the legend of Poe himself has fascinated people for generations. His appearances in popular culture often envision him as a sort of "mad genius" or "tormented artist", exploiting his personal struggles. Many depictions of Poe interweave elements of his life with his works, in part due to Poe's frequent use of first-person narrators, suggesting an erroneous assumption that Poe and his characters are identical.

Additionally, much of Poe's writings and characters have made appearances in other media.

== Comics ==
There have been over three hundred comic book adaptations of Edgar Allan Poe's works as of 2008, possibly more than that of any other American writer. Since then, the number of Poe adaptations in comics has exceeded that of any other comparable period. In addition to direct adaptations, a number of comics have taken Poe as a central character or as the inspiration for characters.

The list below includes only those comics that feature Poe as a character or the inspiration for a character. It does not include every "cameo" appearance or those comics that use only the image of Poe.

- In Funny Pages v.2 #4 (Ultem Publications, 1937) Poe is featured in a three-page semi-biographical sketch called "Edgar Allan Poe: Man of Letters" by Rafael Astarita.
- Crown Comics #1 (Golfing Inc., 1945) features an adaptation of Poe's "The Oblong Box" in which Poe appears as a passenger aboard the ship on which the story takes place.
- Gang Busters #49 (1948), includes Poe in a story called, "The Mystery that Edgar Allan Poe Solved", which is later reprinted in Detective Comics #417.
- Enchanting Love #2 (Kirby Publishing Co, 1949) includes a story entitled "The Beautiful Annabel Lee", which purports to tell of the historical romance between Poe and Virginia Clemm whose death inspires the famous poem.
- Superboy #110 (DC Comics, January 1964) includes a main story entitled "The Surrender of Superboy" in which Poe is one of several historical figures summoned from the past to humiliate Superboy.
- The Atom #12 (Superman DC National Comics, April–May 1964), includes a story entitled "The Gold Hunters of '49!" in which the Atom travels back in time to 1849 and meets Poe while solving a mysterious gold robbery. In the story, Poe utilizes his fencing skills, which he supposedly learned during his time at West Point. This may be the earliest comic in which Poe appears as a character in an original story not based upon his life or works.
- In the Italian comic book Zagor, Poe is an agent of the American secret service called "Elsewhere", with a codename "Raven".
- Detective Comics #417 (DC Comics, November 1971) includes Poe in a story entitled, "The Mystery that Edgar Allan Poe Solved", a reprint of Gang Busters #49 (1948).
- Ghosts #26 (National Periodical Publications, May 1974) features a story called "Dark Destiny" by Leo Dorfman which includes Poe as a character.
- In Arcade: The Comic Review #7 (The Print Mint, 1976), a three-page story entitled "The Inheritance of Rufus Griswold" by Spain Rodriquez tells the story of Poe's death.
- In Haunted #31 (Charlton Comics, 1977), Poe and Roderick Usher appear as characters in the 9-page story "Subway Stop" by Tom Sutton. The story is reprinted in Haunted #56 (Charlton Comics, 1981)
- Crazy Magazine #73 (Marvel Comics, April 1981) includes a story called "The Tattletale Heart", a satire of Poe's famous story which includes Poe as a character.
- Crazy Magazine #89 (Marvel Comics, August 1982) features a one-page story called "The Raven" in which Poe has writer's block, so his next tale his composed by a raven.
- Alien Encounters #10 (Eclipse Comics, December 1986) includes a science fiction story by Ray Bradbury, "The Exiles," in which Poe appears as a character.
- Jason Asala's Poe v.1 (Cheese Comics, 1996) is a series that ran for six issues between September 1996 and April 1997. It features Poe as a wandering adventurer in search of his lost love, Lenore. In order to save her, he must defeat twelve demons. His adventures become the inspiration for many of his tales and poems, including "The Raven", "The Black Cat", "The System of Dr. Tarr and Professor Feather", and "The Bells"
- Jason Asala's Poe vol. 2 (Sirius Entertainment, 1997) is a continuation of the Cheese Comics series. This one ran irregularly for 24 issues between October 1997 and July 2000. It includes references to "The Fall of the House of Usher," "Von Kempel and His Discover," and "The Balloon Hoax".
- Edgar Allan Poe's The Bells (Tome Press, 1999) offers a humorous look at Poe's tendency to fall in love with unobtainable women.
- Snake 'n' Bacon's Cartoon Cabaret (HarperCollins, 2000) features Poe in a short cartoon, "Two-Fisted Poe", in which he punches a man in the face.
- The Phantom #1282 (Frew Publications, 2001) features a story called "The Baltimore Mystery" detailing a fictional explanation of Poe's death, and the Phantom's role in his last days. This story may have appeared in print earlier, in Fantomen #25 (Hegmont, Dec. 2000).
- The Dreaming #56 (Vertigo/DC Comics, 2001) features a tale entitled "The First Adventure of Miss Catterina Poe" centered around Poe's cat who battles a giant predatory worm in order to save Edgar and Virginia Poe.
- Poe (Boom! Studios, 2009) was a four-issue limited series featuring the Poe brothers, William and Edgar, investigating a murder that leads them to the House of Usher. The series ran from July-Oct. 2009, and was reprinted in 2011.
- The Mystery of Mary Rogers (NBM, 2001) is volume five in the Treasury of Victorian Murder graphic novel series, and features an historical re-telling of the real-life murder case on which Poe based his short story, "The Mystery of Marie Roget". Here, Poe appears briefly as a potential suspect in the murder.
- In the Shadow of Edgar Allan Poe (2002) by Jonathon Scott Fuqua follows a professor who has discovered the last diary of Poe, allegedly written on the author's deathbed. The diary reveals that Poe's artistic inspiration came from selling his soul to demons. As part of the deal, Poe can only write while in Baltimore; his attempts to leave that city have dire consequences. The graphic novel from Vertigo Comics is illustrated using digital illustrations and photography by Steven Park and Stephen John Phillips, respectively.
- Batman: Nevermore (DC Comics, June-Oct. 2003) is an Elseworlds mini-series from DC Comics written by Len Wein, with art by Guy Davis. In the story Batman teams up with Poe to solve a number of murders.
- Jill Thompson's graphic novel Death: At Death's Door (DC Comics, 2003) includes Poe as a guest in Death's house as Lucifer evicts the citizens of Hell. He is shown, comically, to be in love with Death's sister Despair, who serves as his muse in the book.
- Scooby-Doo #80 (DC Comics, March 2004) features a story called "Cravin' the Raven" in which a Poe lookalike helps the gang solve a mystery.
- Ravenous (Speakeasy Comics, 2005) is a graphic novel that adapts several of Poe's stories, but also includes an original story "Ravenous" with a detective character inspired by Poe.
- The Surreal Adventures of Edgar Allan Poo (2007) by Dwight MacPherson, is a webcomic originally published on DrunkDuck, which was collected into a trade paperback by ShadowLine. It follows Poe's adventures after he accidentally gets flushed down an outhouse.
- In Kate Beaton's Hark! A Vagrant (Drawn & Quarterly, 2011), Poe appears in the cartoon story "Come Dream With Me," in which he receives unsettling fan mail from Jules Verne. The book also includes a story called "The Return of Annabel Lee", featuring Poe's famous character.
- In the Ahoy Comics series, Edgar Allan Poe's Snifter of Terror (2018-), Poe appears frequently as a "host" character, commenting on adaptations of his work by a variety of artists and writers. His image also appears as a character in many of these adaptations.

== Fiction ==
- "Revenant" is a short story by Walter de la Mare, first published in The Wind Blows Over in 1936, in which Poe listens to a modern lecture on his life and works, then takes the lecturer to task for making facile judgments.
- "When It Was Moonlight" is a short story by Manly Wade Wellman which appeared in the February 1940 issue of Unknown, has Poe pausing in the composition of "The Premature Burial" to investigate a genuine local case, only to find himself faced with a vampire.
- "The Exiles" (1949) is a short story by Ray Bradbury, included in his collection of short stories, The Illustrated Man (1951), in which Poe is an entity who lives in a refuge on Mars. He is erased from time when his last work is destroyed on Earth.
- "The Gentleman From Paris", a short story by John Dickson Carr, first published in Ellery Queen's Mystery Magazine (April 1950), features an unidentified Poe, sitting in a bar in New York, solving a Dupin–like mystery for the title character. Poe disappears before he can receive a substantial reward six months before his death.
- "Richmond, Late September, 1849", a short story by Fritz Leiber, first published in Fantastic, February 1969, in which Poe meets a woman claiming to be the sister of Charles Baudelaire but who may in fact be Death. Poe died October 7, 1849, in Baltimore.
- "The Man Who Collected Poe" by Robert Bloch in which a fanatical Poe collector proves to have resurrected (collected) the real Poe and has him locked in his back room writing new Poe-esque stories. It was filmed as an episode of the film Torture Garden, which Bloch wrote.
- A Singular Conspiracy (1974) by Barry Perowne; A fictional treatment of the unaccounted period from January to May 1844, in which Poe, under an assumed name, visits Paris in a failed effort to join French volunteer soldiers headed to aid Poland against Russia, instead meeting the young Charles Baudelaire and designing a conspiracy to expose Baudelaire's stepfather to blackmail, to free up Baudelaire's captive patrimony.
- The Alteration (1976) by Kingsley Amis is set in an alternative reality where the Protestant Reformation never occurs due to Martin Luther's reconciliation with the Church and the birth of Stephen II of England. In the 'Schismatic' Republic of New England, Poe was an acclaimed general who died in a blaze of glory after successfully repelling the combined forces of Louisiana and Mexico in the war of 1848–50; the airship RNEA Edgar Allan Poe was named for him.
- Poe Must Die (1978) by Marc Olden is a novel that features the poet joining forces with an aging English boxer to thwart the plans of an evil occultist who is attempting to find the legendary Throne of Solomon which gives its possessor power rivaling that of God.
- The Last Mystery of Edgar Allan Poe: The Troy Dossier (1978) is a novel by Manny Meyers which features Poe aiding the New York City police department in 1846 to solve a pair of murders.
- "In the Sunken Museum", a short story by Gregory Frost, first published in The Twilight Zone Magazine, May 1981. An account of Poe's famous last days and his enigmatic last utterance.
- "The Cabinet of Edgar Allan Poe" (1982) by Angela Carter, a short story first published in Interzone, and later collected in Black Venus, traces, with dark humour, the origins of many of the themes in Poe's later fiction to his very early years living with his theatrical mother.
- "Time and Chance", a 1987 short story by Eric M. Heideman appearing in L. Ron Hubbard's Writers of the Future Volume III, features Poe, now Edgar Allan, in a counterfactual reality in which his gambling paid off, in conversation with Ambrose Bierce.
- "No Spot of Ground", a 1989 short story by Walter Jon Williams, features Poe, having survived his harrowing experience in Baltimore, leading Southern troops during the American Civil War. This is not as odd as it seems at first, since Poe did have West Point experience (though brief), and both sides were desperate for men with that kind of background. In the Battle of Gettysburg segment, Poe replaces General James L. Kemper in Pickett's Charge. Like Kemper, Poe is wounded, but unlike Kemper fights on with Robert E. Lee until near the end of the war.
- The Man Who Was Poe (1989), a juvenile novel by Avi, features a young boy named Edmund befriending C. Auguste Dupin, who is actually Poe himself. Edmund and "Dupin" solve several mysteries in Providence, Rhode Island.
- The Hollow Earth (1990), a novel by Rudy Rucker in which Poe explores the inhabited center of the world
- The Black Throne (1990), a science fiction novel by Roger Zelazny and Fred Saberhagen features Poe as one of the main characters alongside a parallel world alter ego, master sergeant Edgar Perry (Poe's alias when he was in the Army). The novel quotes Poe's poems and uses them as inspiration for the plot; one scene is similar to "The Pit and the Pendulum".
- Route 666 (1993), a satirical cyberpunk novel in the Dark Future series by Kim Newman (writing as Jack Yeovil), features a ramshackle Eddy Poe channeling Cthulhu.
- In a separate work by Kim Newman, The Bloody Red Baron, the second volume of his alternate history Anno Dracula series, Poe plays a major role. In the novel, he is a vampire tasked to ghost write the autobiography of flying ace Manfred von Richthofen in the midst of World War I. In the sequel book taking place in 1959, Dracula Cha Cha Cha, Eddy Poe is mentioned as the screenwriter behind an upcoming film.
- The Lighthouse at the End of the World by Stephen Marlowe (1995) concentrates on Poe's last week alive and has C. Auguste Dupin trying to solve his disappearance
- Nevermore (1995) by William Hjortsberg, features Harry Houdini and Arthur Conan Doyle solving a series of murders, which eerily re-enact the stories of Poe.
- The Murder of Edgar Allan Poe (1997) by George Egon Hatvary, features Poe's fictional detective C. Auguste Dupin befriending the author and subsequently investigating his mysterious death.
- Nevermore (1999), The Hum Bug (2001), The Mask of Red Death (2004), and The Tell-Tale Corpse (2006) novels by Harold Schechter. Nevermore depicts an intelligent, crime-solving Poe teamed up with the adventurous man of action, Davy Crockett.
- Lenore: The Last Narrative of Edgar Allan Poe (2002) is a novel by Frank Lovelock that fictionalizes Poe's final days before his death. The story is presented as a delirious dream Poe has while in the hospital. C. August Dupin makes an appearance along with Lenore, depicted as a woman in love with a runaway slave named Reynolds. Lovelock weaves Poe's own letters and works into the story; direct quotes are acknowledged in bold, italicized text with notes on their origins.
- The American Boy (2003) by Andrew Taylor an historical mystery story featuring Poe as a schoolboy in England.
- Edgar Allan Poe's San Francisco: Terror Tales of the City (2005) by Joseph Covino Jr, a derivative psychological gothic horror suspense thriller perfectly faithful to the style and tradition of Edgar Allan Poe set in contemporary San Francisco.
- The Poe Shadow (2006) by Matthew Pearl, a novel which revisits the strange events surrounding Poe's death.
- A fictionalized younger Poe was a main character in Louis Bayard's The Pale Blue Eye, published in May 2006. Poe investigates a mysterious death during his time at West Point. Bayard emphasizes the young Poe's drinking habits.
- Poe plays an indirect part in the Supernatural spin-off novel Supernatural: Nevermore, in which protagonists Dean and Sam Winchester investigate a series of murders in New York based on Poe's stories; Sam deduces that the killer is attempting a resurrection ritual to bring Poe back to life to learn the truth about his death.
- The Blackest Bird (2007) by Joel Rose featured Poe as a main character. The novel correctly follows some of Poe's history in writing and in his personal life.
- A young Edgar Allan Poe, alongside Gullivar Jones, is the main protagonist of the novel Edgar Allan Poe on Mars (2007) by Jean-Marc Lofficier and Randy Lofficier.
- The Joyce Carol Oates book Wild Nights! (2008) tells fictionalized versions of the last nights of Edgar Allan Poe, Emily Dickinson, Mark Twain, Henry James and Ernest Hemingway.
- Edgar Allan Poe is first mistaken for a vampire and then befriended by Abraham Lincoln in Seth Grahame-Smith's novel Abraham Lincoln, Vampire Hunter (2010).
- The ghost of Edgar Allan Poe is often referred to in Robert Rankin's The Brentford Trilogy books. In The Brentford Triangle, he is summoned to Earth by local postman Small Dave, but he becomes angered by Dave's attempt to control him and by his misinterpretation of C. Auguste Dupin.
- Finding Poe (2012) by Leigh M. Lane is a fictionalized account of Poe's final days, speculating the role his unfinished work "The Light-House" may have played in his mysterious death.
- Nevermore by Brent Monahan (WTF Books, 2012) imagines Allan Pinkerton investigating Poe's death.
- He appears in the manga Bungou Stray Dogs (2012), written by Kafka Asagiri and illustrated by Sango Harukawa. He is portrayed as a detective and a writer who admires the detective Ranpo Edogawa.
- Edgar Allan Poe leads a fellowship of vampire hunters set in the year 1888 in the novel Modern Marvels - Viktoriana (2013) written by Wayne Reinagel. The fellowship includes Mary Shelley, Jules Verne, H.G. Wells, Bram Stoker, Arthur Conan Doyle, Nikola Tesla, Harry Houdini and H. Rider Haggard.
- Edgar Allan Poe and the London Monster (Oneworld Publications/ Pegasus Books, 2016); Edgar Allan Poe and the Jewel of Peru (2018); and Edgar Allan Poe and the Empire of the Dead (2020) by Karen Lee Street are books in a mystery trilogy featuring sleuthing duo Edgar Allan Poe and C. Auguste Dupin.
- The Raven's Tale (2019) by Cat Winters is a Young Adult fictionalization of Poe's teen years, complete with a muse named Lenore.
- His Hideous Heart (2019) ed. by Dahlia Adler is a Young Adult anthology of reimaginings of 13 of Poe's works, and also contains the original stories.

== Nonfiction ==
- Poe for Your Problems: Uncommon Advice from History's Least Likely Self-Help Guru (Running Press/Hachette, 2021), by Catherine Baab-Muguira, a satirical self-help book based on Poe's life and work.

== Film ==
Edgar Allen Poe (1909)

- Edgar Allen Poe [sic] (1909), is a silent film directed by D. W. Griffith.
- The Raven (1915), is a fictionalized biography of Poe (played by Henry B. Walthall). The 57-minute silent film depicts Poe's falling out with the Allan family, his love of his wife Virginia, and a few hallucinations caused by wine, one of which seems to inspire his poem "The Raven". Poe is also depicted as owning a "negro" (as named in the film), despite being in dire poverty.
- In The Raven (1935), the uncredited narrator of the "Spirit of Poe" ballet is clearly made up to resemble Poe.
- The Loves of Edgar Allan Poe (1942); Poe is played by John Shepherd (later known as Shepperd Strudwick).
- The Man with a Cloak (1951), a film in which a hard drinking Poe (Joseph Cotten) masquerades as Dupin in 1848 New York – and helps a young French girl secure her inheritance.
- The Tell-Tale Heart (1960) depicts Poe dreaming the story. Poe is played by Laurence Payne.
- Castle of Blood (1964) horror film directed by Antonio Margheriti; Poe is played by Silvano Tranquilli.
- Torture Garden (1967) horror film directed by Freddie Francis; Poe is played by Hedger Wallace.
- Gas-s-s-s (1971) had Edgar Allan Poe riding a motorcycle.
- Nella stretta morsa del ragno (1971) horror film directed by Antonio Margheriti; Poe is played by Klaus Kinski.
- The Spectre of Edgar Allan Poe (1974); Poe is portrayed by Robert Walker Jr.
- Tale of a Vampire (1992) horror film directed by Shimako Sato; Kenneth Cranham plays "Edgar", Suzanna Hamilton is Virginia and her reincarnation Anne, and Julian Sands is Alex, the vampire who completes the triangle.
- Monkeybone (2001), saw Edgar Allan Poe IV return as his namesake again.
- The film Descendant (2003) features two distant relations of Poe, and an appearance of the ghost of Poe himself.
- The independent film The Death of Poe (2006) focuses on the author's last days. Poe is portrayed as being forgetful, possibly as a result of an illness, and becomes a victim of cooping.
- Twixt (2011) a horror film directed by Francis Ford Coppola features Ben Chaplin as Edgar Allan Poe.
- In the fictional comedy film, Lives and Deaths of the Poets (2011) Poe is portrayed by actor, Greg Coale.
- The Raven (2012) stars John Cusack as Poe, in a story about the last days of Poe's life in which he tries to track down a serial killer whose murders parallel deaths in Poe's stories.
- The Pale Blue Eye (2022) is a film adaptation of the 2003 novel by Louis Bayard featuring Harry Melling as Poe.

== Theatre ==
- An opera, The Voyage of Edgar Allan Poe, by Dominick Argento, was first staged in 1976.
- Norman George performed as Poe in an original one-man play, Poe Alone. George has played the title roles in A&E Network's Biography: The Mystery of Edgar Allan Poe, and other educational films and television and radio documentaries in the United States and Canada.
- Lee Presson of Lee Presson and the Nails has been performing as Poe at the Great Dickens Christmas Fair in San Francisco since 1988.
- In the mid-1990s, The Palm Beach Shakespeare Festival presented Edgar – The Life of Edgar Allan Poe by Jack Yuken at five south Florida venues. Kevin Crawford was Poe. R.A. Smith and Heidi Harris co-starred. Kermit Christman directed.
- Actor John Astin, who performed as Gomez in The Addams Family television series, is an ardent admirer of Poe, whom he resembles. From 1998 to 2004, Astin starred in a one-man play based on Poe's life and works, Edgar Allan Poe: Once Upon a Midnight.
- Edgar Allan POE is a musical by Eric Woolfson, first premiering at the Abbey Road Studio Showcase in 2003.
- The Death of Edgar Allan Poe is a play by playwright P. Shane Mitchell.
- In 2005, a reading of the Broadway-bound musical Poe was announced, with a book by David Kogeas and music and lyrics by David Lenchus, featuring Deven May as Edgar Allan Poe. Plans for a full production have not been announced.
- In early 2007, NYC composer Phill Greenland and book writer/actor Ethan Angelica announced a new Poe stage musical titled Edgar, which uses only Poe's prose and letters as text, and Poe's poems as lyrics.
- The 2008 Japanese/Australian rock musical Once Upon a Midnight takes its title from the beginning of The Raven.
- Nevermore: The Imaginary Life and Mysterious Death of Edgar Allan Poe, a musical written, composed, and directed by Jonathan Christenson. It was originally produced in 2009 at the Catalyst Theatre in Edmonton, Alberta and went on to be performed at theatre festivals and theatres across Canada, and to the Barbican Theater in London, and the New Victory Theatre in NYC. In January 2015, the show returned to New York in an Off-Broadway production at New World Stages.
- Fall of the House, a play by Robert Ford, premiered April 9, 2010 at the Alabama Shakespeare Festival. The play features vignettes from the last week of Poe's life and from the last days of his mother's life, both of which intersect with a modern-day plotline.
- The 2016 musical, The House of Edgar by Thomas F. Arnold, produced by The Argosy Theatre Company at the Edinburgh Fringe 2016, is based on the life and works of Poe.
- American actor David Crawford devised and performed a one-man play entitled Poe's Last Night at the Edinburgh Fringe 2016 and Brighton Fringe 2017 at The Rialto Theatre.
- Another Poe impersonator is Baltimore-native David Keltz, who is notable for often starring in the annual Poe birthday celebration at Westminster Hall and Burying Ground every January.

== Audio theater/Radio theater ==
The 2011 audio play The Poe Toaster Not Cometh, by Washington Audio Theater, explains the mysterious death of Edgar Allan Poe by depicting Poe as a vampire who comes to life in modern times and engages in a killing spree in Baltimore. The play seeks to explain the Poe Toaster mystery by suggesting the Poe Toaster is in fact a contemporary of Poe's, surviving through the centuries via occult means.

== Television ==
- In 1973, Poe (played by Larry "Seymour" Vincent) was the villain opposite Don Adams in a commercial for Aurora's Pendulum Pool.
- Dickens of London (1976), a television miniseries featured Seymour Matthews as Poe.
- Sabrina, the Teenage Witch (1999), where Poe is played by actor Edgar Allan Poe IV in the episode "Episode LXXXI: The Phantom Menace." Edgar Allan Poe IV is the great-great-great-grandnephew of Edgar Allan Poe.
- An episode of the Cartoon Network series Time Squad, about time travelers tasked with setting right errors in history, featured an uncharacteristically happy E.A.Poe, more concerned with happy rainbows and pink bunnies, than matters of the Macabre. History was returned to normal by introducing this erroneous Poe to a morose state of misery and depression, finally appreciating the horrors and misery of the world around him.
- An episode of Mr. Peabody & Sherman features the titular time-travelers visiting Poe. Sherman was shocked to find Poe writing Winnie the Pooh, and insisted that Poe should write horror stories. "I tried," Poe answered. "But all my stories have happy endings!" Sherman suggests taking Poe to a haunted house for inspiration.
- In the episode "Escape to the House of Mummies Part II" (2006) of The Venture Bros., Brock Samson, Hank, and Dean, team up with Edgar Allan Poe, as well as Caligula, Brock Samson (past), and Sigmund Freud.
- The 2007 Masters of Horror episode "The Black Cat" wove elements of Poe's life in with the story of the same name. Poe was played by Jeffrey Combs, a horror movie veteran who has worked closely on a number of Stuart Gordon's (the director) previous projects.
- The 2013 South Park episode "Goth Kids 3: Dawn of the Posers" used Poe as a central character to bring the plot forward.
- In the second season of Witches of East End, portrayed by Daniel DiTomasso, Poe is seen in the episode "Poe Way Out" (2014) in a relationship with a former self of one of the main characters, Freya.
- In 2017 Poe was the subject of the PBS American Masters film Edgar Allan Poe: Buried Alive.
- The 2018 Netflix cyberpunk series Altered Carbon features an AI character whose image is based on Poe, and called Edgar Poe, who runs a hotel called The Raven.
- The 2022 Netflix series Wednesday incorporates references to Poe, particularly through the show's themes and depictions. Poe is stated to have been a student at Nevermore Academy, the series' primary setting.
- The 2023 Netflix miniseries The Fall of the House of Usher directed by Mike Flanagan is loosely adapted from several of Poe's works, as well as featuring homages to the writer.

== Music ==
The influence of Edgar Allan Poe on the art of music has been considerable and long-standing, with the works, life and image of the horror fiction writer and poet inspiring composers and musicians from diverse genres for more than a century.

Leon Botstein, conductor of the American Symphony Orchestra—which presented a program of "Tales From Edgar Allan Poe" in 1999—noted that in the realm of classical music, as in literature, Poe's influence was felt more deeply in Europe than in America.

- In 1907, American composer Grace Chadbourne set Poe's text to music with her "Hymn for Solo Voice: At Morn, at Noon, at Twilight Dim."
- The Beatles' album Sgt. Pepper's Lonely Hearts Club Band (1967) includes Poe as one of the people in the crowd on the front cover. Poe is also referenced in their song "I Am the Walrus".
- The Finnish composer Einojuhani Rautavaara based his 1997 choral fantasy "On the Last Frontier" on the final two paragraphs of Poe's novel The Narrative of Arthur Gordon Pym of Nantucket.
- Lou Reed's 2003 concept album The Raven consists of interpretations of Poe's stories and poems, selected and arranged by Reed and performed by him and a number of guest vocalists.
- The British and American composer Tarik O'Regan uses portions of Poe's poem Israfel as the basis of his 2006 composition The Ecstasies Above for voices and string quartet.
- Composer Adam Stern led the world premiere of his “Spirits of the Dead” for narrator and orchestra with narrator Edmond Stone and the Seattle Philharmonic Orchestra in October 2014.
- In 2017, French pop/celtic singer Nolwenn Leroy has set Poe's poems "A Dream" and "The Lake" to music, released on her album Gemme.
- In May 2023 singers Teya and Salena represented Austria in the Eurovision Song Contest 2023 in Liverpool, United Kingdom, with the song "Who the Hell Is Edgar?". The song title being a reference Poe and the song a satire of the music industry and the difficulties of being a lyricist, who are usually paid very little.
- In 2024, The Vaccines released a song titled “The Dreamer” which references Poe: “We were weaving in and out of Edgar Allen Poe".
- "A Dream of Poe" is a gothic doom metal band that is heavily inspired by Poe's work.
- In 2025 mojan released a song titled "The Raven", taken from Edgar Allan Poe's poem of the same name. This song is in the gothic rock and heavy metal music genre and is song in both Persian and English language.

== Video games ==
- Edgar Allan Poe and his works are mentioned in the 2009 Nancy Drew computer game Warnings at Waverly Academy. The plot of the game is loosely based on the Nancy Drew book Curse of the Black Cat.
- The Dark Eye follows the Poe stories "The Cask of Amontillado", "The Tell-Tale Heart", and "Berenice" from the point of view of an unnamed narrator.
- Fallout 4 features Fort Independence after a nuclear war. In the basement, a skeleton can be found entombed in a wall as a reference to "The Cask of Amontillado." Nearby is a case of Amontillado wine, with the label reading Montressor and being bottled by P. Edgar.

== Online ==
- In the web series Epic Rap Battles of History, Poe appears in rap conflict with Stephen King, in which he (Poe) is portrayed by George Watsky.
- The production company Shipwrecked Comedy has featured Edgar Allan Poe in several of their web series. He is portrayed by Sean Persaud. He first appeared in the 2013 series A Tell Tale Vlog in which he is being haunted by Lenore the Ghost. The same character reappears in episode 4 of their series Kissing in the Rain, released in 2014. In 2016, they Shipwrecked Comedy released Edgar Allan Poe's Murder Mystery Dinner Party, which features Poe inviting several famous authors to his home for a dinner party. A Christmas short titled Edgar Allan Poe's A Cryptmas Carol was released in 2018.

== See also ==
Poe's work has had extensive influence on culture:

- Edgar Allan Poe in television and film
- Allusions to Poe's "The Raven"
