= Joseph Winterbotham =

American Entrepreneur

- Born: 1852; Columbus, Ohio, US
- Died: 1925 (aged 72–73)
- Occupation(s): Businessman and art patron
- Spouse: Genevieve Baldwin
- Children: 4, including Rue Winterbotham Carpenter
- Relatives: John Alden Carpenter (son-in-law)

Joseph Humphrey Winterbotham (1852-1925), was a Chicago manufacturer, bank director and Chicago Art Institute benefactor.

== Early life ==
Joseph Humphrey Winterbotham was born in Columbus, Ohio, in 1852.

== Career ==
Winterbotham "organized no fewer than eleven corporations, including cooperage manufacture, moving and transfer, and mortgage financing".

== Personal life ==
He married Genevieve Baldwin (1853-1906) of New Haven, Connecticut, and they had four children, including Rue Winterbotham Carpenter.

Their sons John and Joseph, Jr. were educated at Yale University, and their daughters, Rue and Genevieve, travelled to Europe.
