= Rue Winterbotham Carpenter =

American art collector and philanthropist

- Born: Luritia Winterbotham; 1876
- Died: 1931 (aged 54–55); Chicago, Illinois, US
- Occupations: Art collector and philanthropist
- Known for: Co-founded the Arts Club of Chicago
- Title: President, Arts Club of Chicago
- Term: 1918–1931
- Predecessor: Mrs. Robert McGann
- Successor: Elizabeth "Bobsy" Goodspeed
- Spouse: John Alden Carpenter
- Children: 1
- Parents: Joseph Humphrey Winterbotham (father); Genevieve Winterbotham (nee Baldwin) (mother)

Luritia "Rue" Winterbotham Carpenter (1876–1931), was an American art collector and philanthropist, who co-founded the Arts Club of Chicago.

== Early life ==
She was born Rue Winterbotham, the daughter of Joseph Humphrey Winterbotham (1852–1925), a Chicago manufacturer, bank director, Chicago Art Institute benefactor and Michigan state senator, and his wife Genevieve Winterbotham, née Baldwin (1853–1906).

== Career ==
Carpenter was a designer and an interior decorator. Carpenter was one of the founders of the Arts Club of Chicago in 1916 and was its president from 1918 until her death in 1931. Her niece Rue Winterbotham Shaw became president in 1940.

== Personal life ==
In 1901, Carpenter married the composer John Alden Carpenter. They had one daughter Genevieve Baldwin Carpenter, later Genevieve Carpenter Hill.

In 1929, they lived at 942 Lake Shore Drive, Chicago.

On December 7, 1931, Carpenter died in Chicago, Illinois.

=== Legacy ===
Carpenter's 1920 portrait, which was painted by Arthur Ambrose McEvoy, is held in the Art Institute of Chicago. It was gifted to them by Genevieve Carpenter Hill.
