= Grace Chadbourne =

American composer, pianist and singer

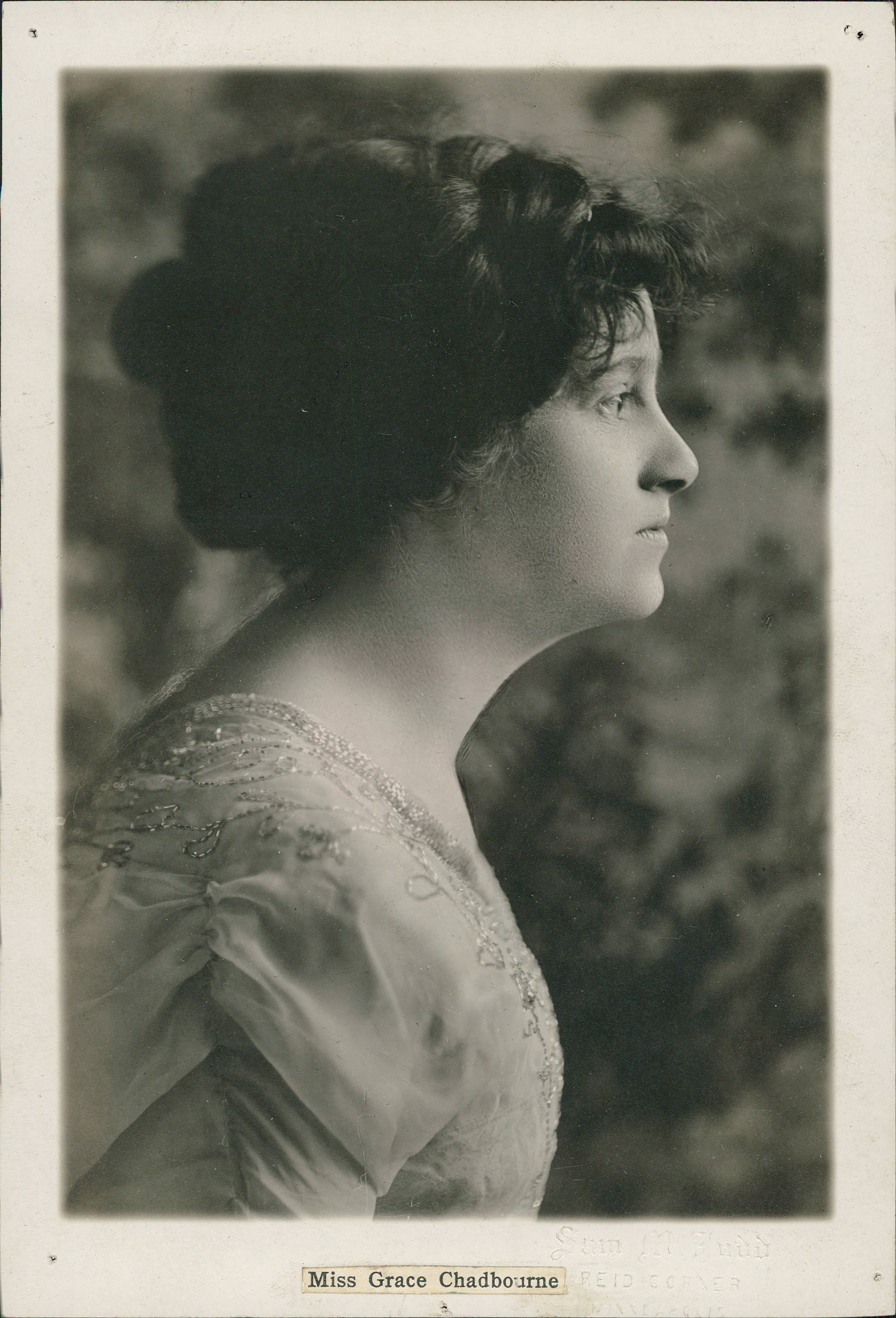

Background information
- Also known as: Grace Wassall
- Born: Grace Runnion; 1870
- Died: June 9, 1919 (aged 48–49)
- Occupations: Composer, musician
- Instruments: Piano, singer
- Spouses: Joseph Wassall (m. 1890, divorced); Thomas Chadbourne (m. 1906)

Grace Runnion Wassall Chadbourne (1870 – Jun 9, 1919) was an American composer, pianist, and singer.

She married Joseph William Wassall in 1890 and they had two children, Ellen and LeRoy. After divorcing Wassall, she married Thomas Lincoln Chadbourne in 1906. The Chadbournes lived in London, Minnesota, and New York.

Chadbourne studied music at the Minneapolis School of Music, Oratory and Dramatic Art and with Frank Bibb and Bernhard Ziehn. She also attended Oscar Seagle's Summer Music Colony in Schroon Lake, New York, and performed as an accompanist, a solo singer, and in a vocal quartet.

Chadbourne experienced what she described as a "nervous breakdown" in February 1909 and at the suggestion of a friend, turned to Christian Science, which she believed healed her. In September 1909, her first husband Joseph Wassall drowned in a yacht accident on Lake Michigan. Their daughter Ellen had lived with Wassall, and when he died, she petitioned the court to transfer guardianship to their housekeeper rather than her mother. Chadbourne's second husband, Thomas Chadbourne, adopted her son LeRoy.

Chadbourne's works were published by the John Church Company under "Wassall" and "Chadbourne," and sung by Johanna Gadski and David Bispham, among others. Her compositions, all for voice, include:

- "Busy Child"
- "Cakes and Ale"
- "Concerning Love"
- "Doll's Calendar" (text by Nora Archibald Smith)
- "Feast of the Doll" (text by Nora Archibald Smith)
- "February and November"
- "Green Singing Book" (text by Josephine Preston Peabody)
- "Hymn for Solo Voice: At Morn, at Noon, at Twilight Dim" (text by Edgar Allan Poe)
- "Journey"
- "Masterpiece"
- Shakespeare Song Cycle (text by William Shakespeare)
- "Source" (text by Josephine Preston Peabody)
- "Window Pane Songs" (text by Josephine Preston Peabody)
- "Windy Nights: (text by Robert Louis Stevenson)
