= Thomas Chadbourne =

American lawyer (1871–1938)

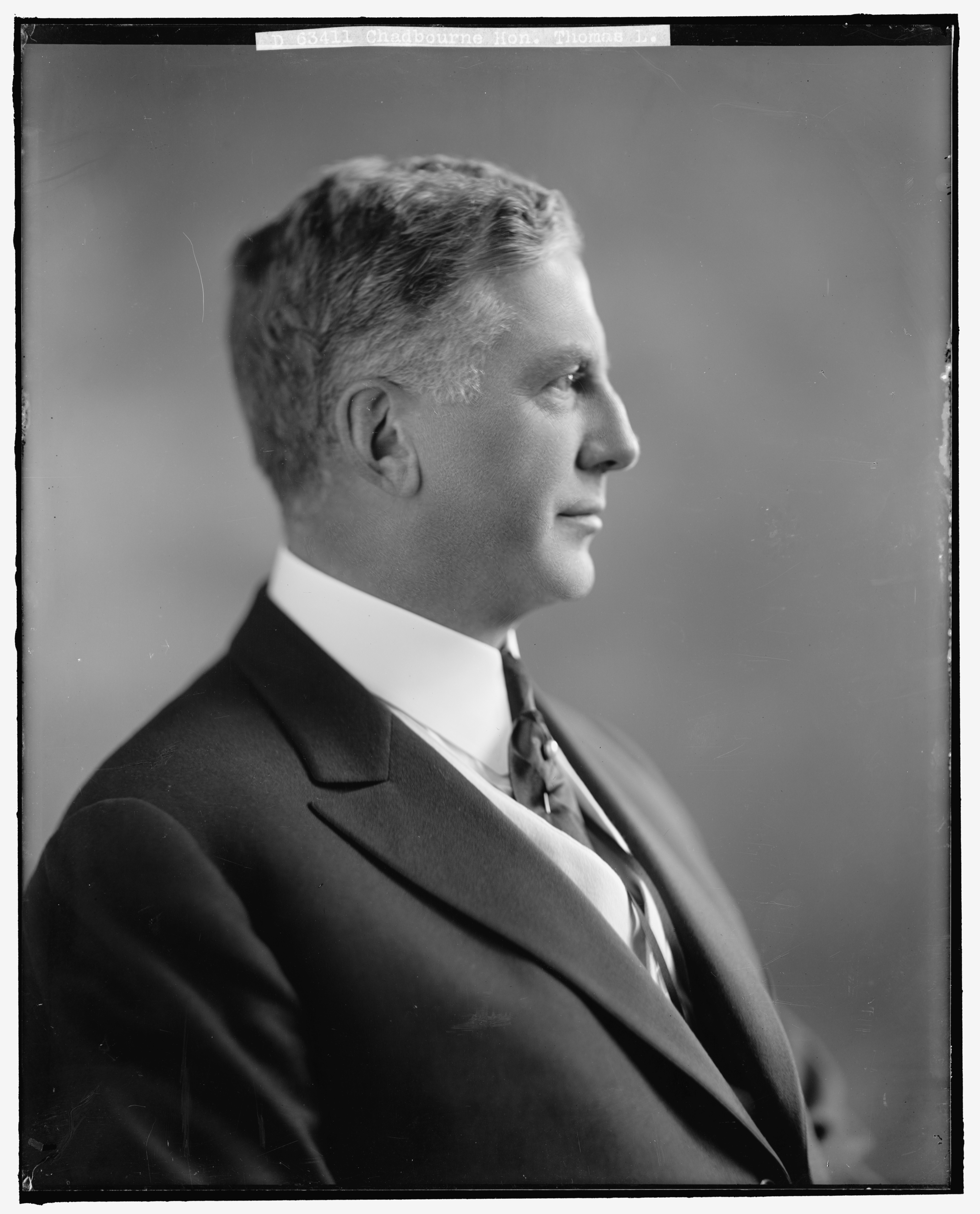
- Born: March 21, 1871; Houghton, Michigan, U.S.
- Died: June 15, 1938 (aged 67); New York City, U.S.
- Occupation: Lawyer
- Spouses: Emily Crane Chadbourne (m. 1896; div. 1906) Grace Chadbourne (m. 1906; died 1919) Marjorie Curtis Chadbourne (m. 1921)
- Children: 3 (2 biological, 1 adopted)
- Parent(s): Thomas Lincoln Chadbourne Jr. Georgina Kay Chadbourne

Thomas Lincoln Chadbourne (March 21, 1871 – June 15, 1938) was an American lawyer who played a key role in the establishment of multinational corporations during the 1920s and undertook efforts to restore commodity prices, particularly in the sugar industry, after their collapses during the Great Depression.

Chadbourne was the founder of the law firm known as Chadbourne & Parke. Established in New York City in 1902 as Chadbourne, Babbitt & Wallace, the firm underwent a 1924 merger to become Chadbourne, Stanchfield, & Levy before it took on its current name. Chadbourne & Parke is consistently ranked among the top 100 law firms in the world. At the time of his death, Chadbourne served as board chairman of the International Mining Corporation and was a director of some 20 corporations. He had amassed a fortune and was regarded by some contemporaries as a "radical capitalist" for his views on profit sharing and recognition of collective bargaining rights.

== Early life and career ==
Chadbourne was born March 21, 1871, in Houghton, Michigan, to Thomas Lincoln Chadbourne Sr., a lawyer and Harvard graduate, and Georgina Kay Chadbourne. He describes himself in his autobiography as having been a "twelve pound baby." He is described as a rambunctious youth who ran away from home at age three before he was expelled from a series of schools throughout his young life as a "bad influence." "By the time I was twelve," Chadbourne states, "I had become a crack pool player – the infallible sign of worthlessness."

At age six, Chadbourne witnessed the death of his sister Eliza, called "Leila." She was a toddler aged three, and died after running through two panes of glass and sustaining severe cuts. He described the event as a graphic and horrific experience.

At age 19, Chadbourne was turned out of the house by his parents. His father left him at the train station bound for Chicago with $150 and the advice that he was "not fitted for a profession or any other work in life that calls for mental effort" and should go into manual labor.

Chadbourne took a series of night jobs, including one as a police officer, before he was hired by Judge Russell Wing at the law firm Wing and Carter. Despite never attending law school, Chadbourne's training under Judge Wing left him well prepared for the state bar exam, which he passed with a ranking of two out of 35. Chadbourne founded the law firm Eschweiler and Chadbourne with a cousin in Milwaukee before going on to found the prestigious Chadbourne, Babbitt & Wallace, which survives today as Chadbourne and Parke.

== Family ==
Chadbourne married his first wife, Emily Crane Chadbourne November 1896. The two separated in 1899 and formally divorced seven years later.

He then married his second wife, composer Grace Chadbourne, in November 1906. Chadbourne regarded Grace as the love of his life and the two traveled extensively. Chadbourne adopted her son LeRoy. Grace suffered from cancer in 1918 and died in May 1919.

He took a third wife, Marjorie Curtis Chadbourne, on January 15, 1921. The couple had two daughters: Marjorie and Leila, who was named after Chadbourne's deceased sister.

== Great Depression ==
Chadbourne represented some of the largest firms in the world in a period of globalization during the 1920s during which multi-national corporations began to be established in significant numbers. Following the 1929 crash, he summed up his own responsibility thus: "The capitalistic system is on trial. If we think the people who are running the industries of this world can by reason of greed bring about such a depression as this and not take steps to mend it, no matter what sacrifice may be to individuals, we are mistaken. We can't get away with it."

Representing a consortium of sugar producers in an attempt to stabilize world sugar prices during the Great Depression, the Chadbourne Committee, meeting in Brussels under Chadbourne's leadership, secured an agreement between several nations to reduce production and establish export quotas. (Yale) Signatories included Cuba, Java, Hungary, Poland, Czechoslovakia and an initially reluctant Germany. Production was to be curtailed by 15% and held at that level over a five-year period. Chadbourne planned additional negotiations with countries that consumed but produced little to no sugar in an attempt to stop them from entering the market, including the United Kingdom, France, Yugoslavia, Argentina, and Japan. When the agreement was reached, in May 1931, the worldwide sugar surplus had reached an estimated 3.5 million tons. Prices had fallen from a pre-Depression level of 7 cents per pound to just 1.5 cents per pound. Low prices of commodities, including sugar, depressed wages within the US and perpetuated crises in Caribbean single-commodity producing nations. The situation is cited as a key factor inciting the revolution in Cuba that would ultimately result in the ouster of the Machado government. To alleviate misgivings from impoverished consumers in his native United States, Chadbourne stressed that the maneuver would serve to restore prices paid by refineries to sugar producers but would not affect retail prices. Some contemporaries took exception at that claim. Among these, some observers recognized a need to restore prices even at the expense of consumers, but others condemned the practice as protecting domestic business profits and exacerbating public hardship. Concerns were expressed that farm yields were failing to cover production costs, and farm foreclosures were pervasive during that period. However, despite successfully limiting production among signatories, Chadbourne was unable to effect a return to pre-Depression prices because US producers increased cultivation and continued to flood the market. At the same time, India doubled its sugar exports from some 3,000,000 tons in 1930 to 6,000,000 tons in 1935. Neither the United States nor the United Kingdom participated in the Chadbourne Committee discussions. Citing inadequate means to compel other farmers to adhere to quotas, US producers had already refused to accept production caps proposed by Chadbourne. Congress and the Franklin Roosevelt administration would respond to the ongoing crisis by adopting such compulsory measures, along with subsidies for farmers leaving land uncultivated, under the Agricultural Adjustment Act of 1933 and Jones–Costigan amendment of 1934.

Chadbourne argued for the creation of a "silver reserve system" wherein all countries would agree to hold a reserve stock (a bullion) of silver and to produce coinage using a consistent portion of silver. The plan was conceived in response to silver devaluation, which Chadbourne attributed to countries "dumping" large amounts of silver on the world market, by reducing the amount of silver they used in coins. Chadbourne estimated that half of the world's population held its wealth in silver. Those individuals saw their wealth steadily eroded with the growing worldwide silver surplus. The proposed system would work much in the same way as the Federal Reserve uses monetary policy. To stem inflation, Chadbourne asserted, nations could release stock of silver into the market from their reserves. The concept differs from Federal Reserve tools primarily in that a "bullion" is a stock measured in volume, rather than monetary value. Chadbourne hoped to change the trend whereby silver had become a commodity, rather than a store of value.

== Politics ==
Responding to the crisis of the Great Depression, Chadbourne asserted that the capitalist system itself was "on trial" (see above) and argued for the need for intervention by industrialists to curb the downturn. Chadbourne was an early champion of both collective bargaining rights and profit-sharing for workers.

Chadbourne was very active in the Democratic Party and was a major supporter of Alfred E. Smith, the Governor of New York. Chadbourne donated $30,000 to Smith's campaign officially and allegedly provided over $400,000 of cash and stock options to Smith secretly.

Chadbourne carried on a correspondence with President Woodrow Wilson over the course of 1917 to 1921, much of which is reprinted in Chadbourne's autobiography. Chadbourne sat on the War Trade Board from which he resigned, despite urgings from the president to stay, to attend his ailing wife.

Chadbourne is listed as a top contributor to the "Graphic Founders Fund," which gave financial support to the monthly publication Survey Graphic, an offshoot of The Survey magazine. Survey Graphic published articles on fascism and anti-Semitism and is perhaps best known for its role in the Harlem Renaissance.

== Globalization ==
An early adherent of modern globalization, Chadbourne criticized isolationists and emphasized the necessity of world trade in establishing and sustaining American affluence: "Only the blind can fail to see that distance has been annihilated, geographical barriers smashed down, and that it is now an interlocked and absolutely interdependent world in which we live. [T]he prosperity of the United States is dependent upon world trade. Our production, farm and factory, has been developed to a point where it is from ten to twenty per cent in excess of domestic demand, and any failure to find foreign markets for this surplus means the dislocation of our whole industrial establishment."

=== Trade barriers ===
Chadbourne railed against the Smoot–Hawley Tariff: "How have we gone about the business of protecting and promoting the world trade so vital to our prosperity? We pass the highest tariff bill in history...and with what result? Already some forty-five nations have raised tariff walls of their own in direct retaliation."

=== Dangers of financial crisis and war ===
Calling for a moratorium of European debt repayments from World War I, Chadbourne issued a prescient warning that war would follow the financial crisis.

== Later life ==
Chadbourne died June 15, 1938 in Manhattan after he suffered a heart attack on his yacht.

Chadbourne's law partner, Louis S. Levy, was disbarred in 1939 for arranging a bribe of almost $250,000 to Federal Judge Martin T. Manton.
