= Theodora Sturkow-Ryder =

American musician (1876–1958)

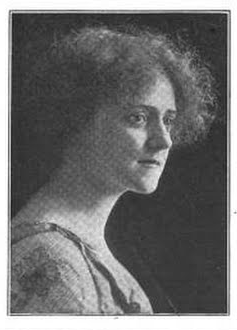
- Theodora Sturkow-Ryder, from a 1915 publication.

Background information
- Born: Theodora Sturkow; August 11, 1876; Philadelphia, Pennsylvania
- Died: August 3, 1958 (aged 81)
- Instrument: piano
- Formerly of: Chicago Symphony Orchestra

Theodora Sturkow-Ryder (August 11, 1876 – August 3, 1958) was an American concert pianist, composer, music critic and piano teacher, based in Chicago.

== Early life ==
Theodora Sturkow was born in Philadelphia, Pennsylvania, and raised in Chicago, the daughter of Ferdinand Louis Wilhelm Sturckow and Elizabeth Symington Sturckow. Her father was a baker and an amateur violinist who encouraged her musical interests. Her mother was a writer who used the pseudonym "Elizabeth Creighton". Her sister was actress Elsie Esmond. Frederick Grant Gleason and Regina Watson were among her teachers and mentors.

== Career ==
She was a soloist with the Chicago Symphony Orchestra in 1920, when one reviewer admired her as having "the strongest sort of rhythmic sense", adding that "her search for beautiful quality and fineness of interpretation is constant, and she never allows for one moment either harshness or uncertainty to creep into her playing."

She was a music critic for the Pittsburgh Dispatch newspaper, toured as a concert pianist, and taught at the American Academy of Music in Chicago. She was a member of the National Guild of Piano Teachers, the National League of American Pen Women, the Chicago Woman's Musical Club, and the San Francisco Musical Club. Her performing schedule was busy enough to involve flying between cities in 1922, still a novelty at the time. Later in her career, she represented a radio manufacturer, giving concerts and demonstrations and promoting radio as a tool for music education. From 1912 onwards, she was a pioneer in recording hand-played player piano rolls, and her playing is preserved on many hundreds of these rolls, recorded for the QRS, Ampico, and Aeolian companies.

Works composed by Sturkow-Ryder included The Great Lakes and From the Family Album (both symphonic suites), songs for piano and voice, and "twelve dances for violin and piano". She also co-wrote the music for a musical farce, Stockyards Sally (1922). She may have used the androgynous pseudonym "Dorian Welch" on some compositions and piano rolls. In 1935 she attended the American Women Composers' Conference in Chautauqua, New York.

== Personal life ==
Theodora Sturkow married twice. Her first husband was Benjamin Hudson Ryder, an electrical engineer from Pittsburgh; they married in 1906 and he died in 1925. Her second husband was Frank J. Snite. Theodora Sturkow-Ryder Snite died in 1958, aged 82 years, in Oakland, California. Sturkow-Ryder's papers are archived in the Newberry Library.
