= Compass Inn =

United States inn and tavern

- U.S. National Register of Historic Places
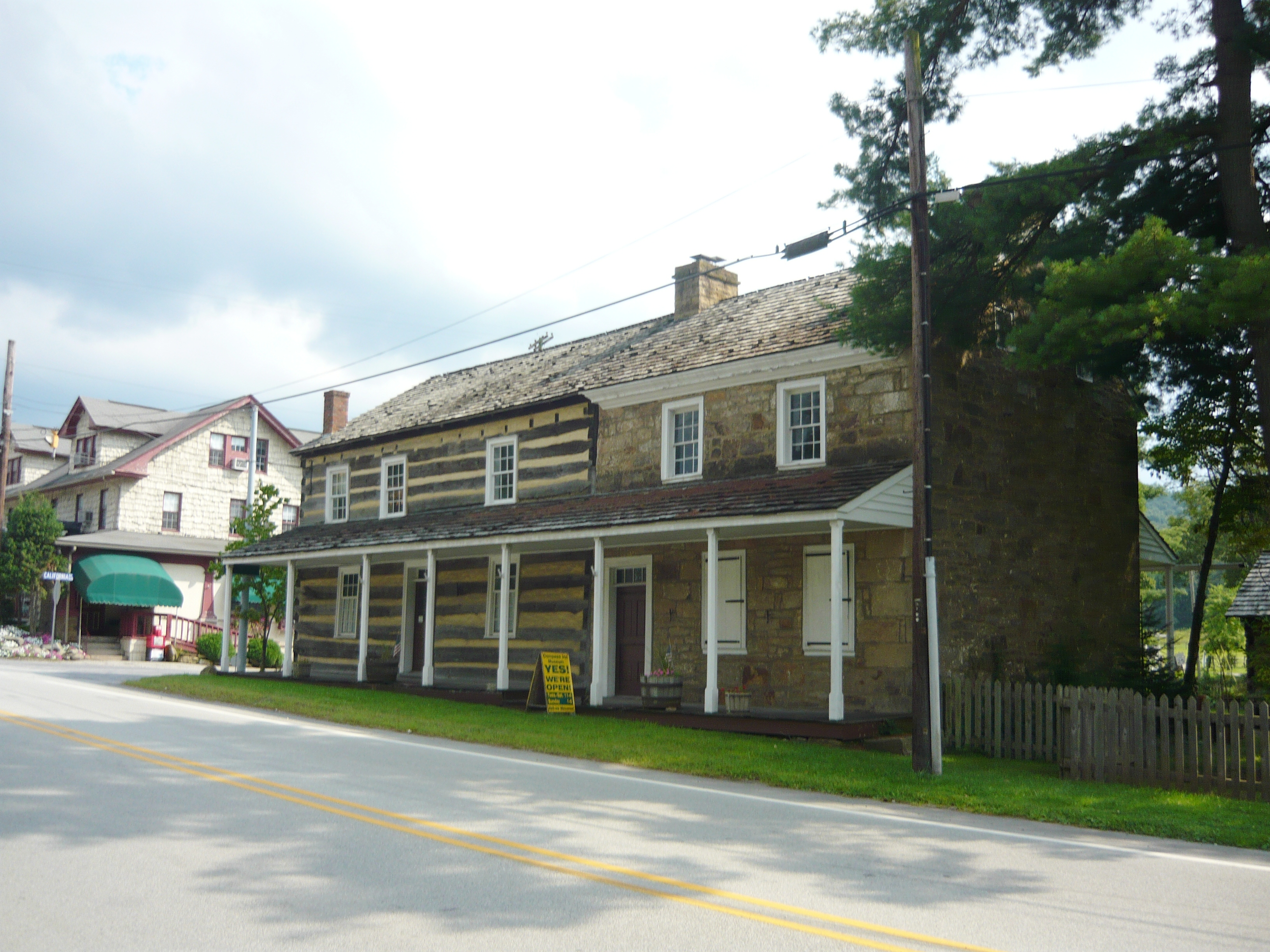
- Compass Inn, August 2011

- Location within Pennsylvania Location within the United States
- Location: Jct. of US 30 (Lincoln Hwy.) and California Ave., Ligonier Township, Pennsylvania
- Coordinates: 40°12′43″N 79°11′57″W
- Area: less than one acre
- Built: 1799, c. 1825
- NRHP reference No.: 95000124
- Added to NRHP: February 24, 1995

Compass Inn is a historic inn, tavern, and stagecoach stop located in Laughlintown, Ligonier Township, Westmoreland County, Pennsylvania. It is a 2 1/2-storey, five bay log and stone building in a vernacular Georgian style. The original section was built in 1799, and it is three bays wide. The two bay stone section was added in the 1820s. A clapboarded frame section was added in 1862. It was restored in 1970, and operated as a local history museum. The property includes a rebuilt barn and blacksmith shop.

Compass Inn was added to the National Register of Historic Places on February 24, 1995. It is notable for representing the history of highway inns, travel, and commerce in southwestern Pennsylvania from 1799 to 1862.

Portions of the film The Pale Blue Eye were shot at Compass Inn in 2021.
