= Gold Cup Steeplechase =

The International Gold Cup was first held in 1930 at Grasslands Downs, Tennessee.

== Overview ==
Two years later it was moved to the Rolling Rock Club course in Pennsylvania. For the next fifty-two years the meet was held at this private country club located in the Ligonier Valley about fifty miles outside Pittsburgh. Proceeds from the annual Rolling Rock Hunt Race Meeting went to the Home for Crippled Children.

The Rolling Rock Hunt Meet ended in 1983 and the following year the International Gold Cup relocated to Virginia, where a stunning trophy, donated by the King of Spain, is still awarded each fall to the winner.
