= Arts Club of Chicago =

Private club in Chicago, Illinois, US

The Arts Club of Chicago
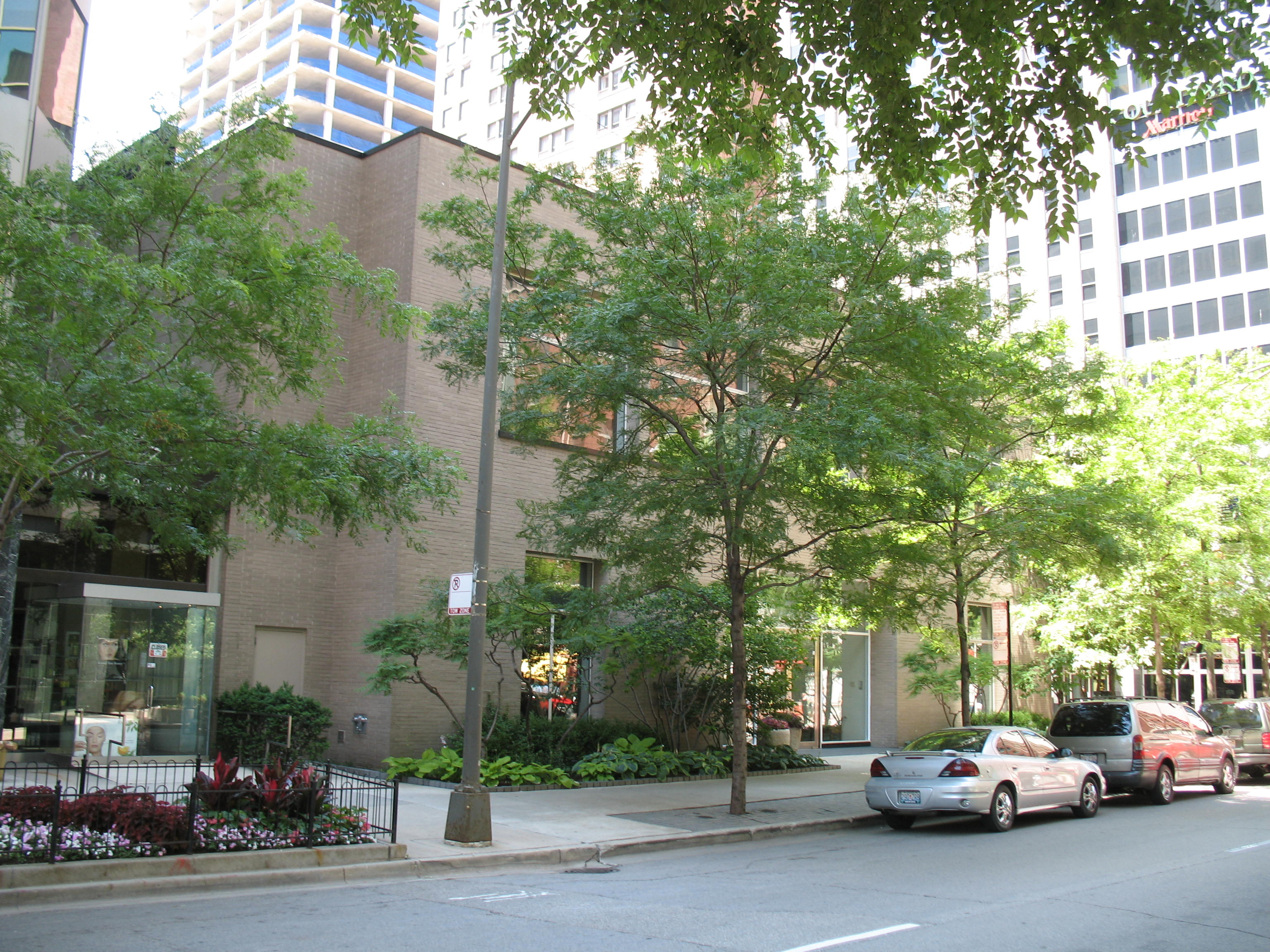

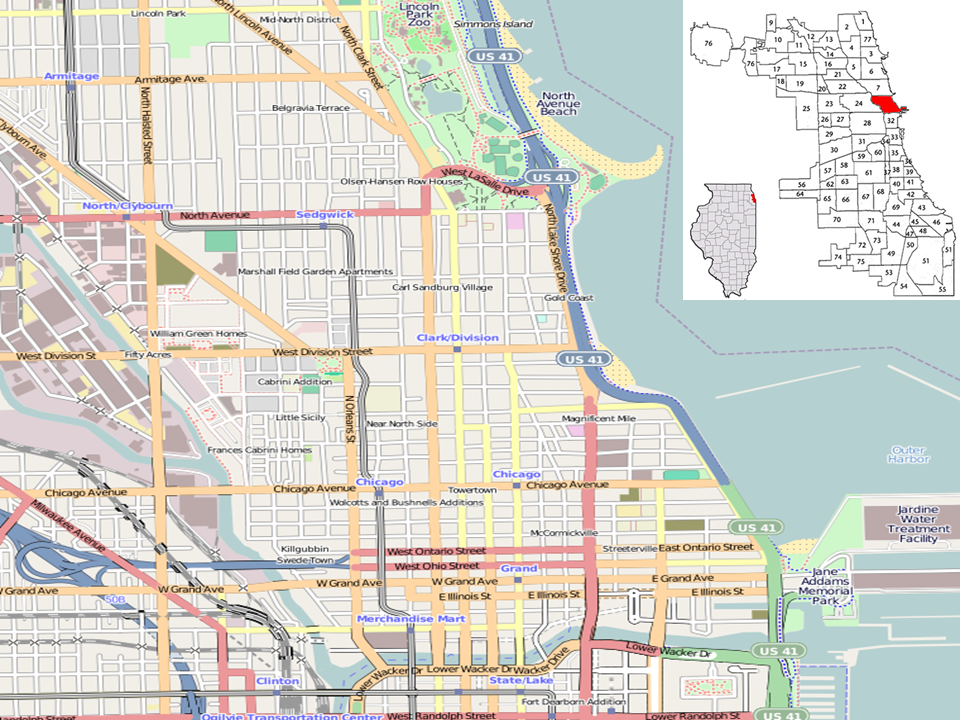
- Location within Chicago's Near North Side community area
- Established: 1916 (current location since April 4, 1997)
- Location: 201 E. Ontario Street, Chicago, Illinois 60611; United States
- Coordinates: 41.8931°N 87.6224°W
- Director: Janine Mileaf
- Website: www.artsclubchicago.org

Arts Club of Chicago is a private club and public exhibition space located in the Near North Side community area of Chicago, a block east of the Magnificent Mile, that exhibits international contemporary art. It was founded in 1916, inspired by the success of the Art Institute of Chicago's handling of the Armory Show. Its founding was viewed as a statement that art had become an important component of civilized urban life. The Arts Club is said to have been pro-Modernist from its founding. The Club strove to break new ground with its shows, rather than collect the works of established artists as the Art Institute does.

The club presented Pablo Picasso's first United States showing. In addition, the 1951 exhibition by Jean Dubuffet and his "Anticultural Positions" lecture at the Arts Club were tremendous influences on what would become the mid-1960s Imagist movement. Another important presentation in the history of the Arts Club was the Fernand Léger showing of Le Ballet Mecanique.

The club's move in 1997 to its current location at 201 E. Ontario Street was not without controversy because the club demolished its former interior space designed by Ludwig Mies van der Rohe and moved only the central staircase to the new gallery space. However, the new space is 19,000 square feet (1,800 m^{2}), which is 7,000 square feet (650 m^{2}) larger than the old space.

== Mission and purpose ==
The inaugural mission of the club was "to encourage higher standards of art, maintain galleries for that purpose, and to promote the mutual acquaintance of art lovers and art workers." The Arts Club of Chicago was founded by artists and patrons in the wake of The Armory Show, which was on view at the Art Institute of Chicago in 1913. The club's founders—made aware of the exhibition's negative reception by the many Chicagoans who did not understand or accept what they saw—aimed to expose the city to new images, sounds and ideas.

Conceived as an exhibition and social space that would cultivate sophisticated conversations around a range of media, The Arts Club has maintained its core interest in presenting culture "in the making," serving as a key venue in Chicago for the presentation of work by the national and international avant-garde.

The club does not generally show traveling exhibitions curated by others. Instead, it curates its own exhibits, often with very original works. This places emphasis on cutting edge and avant-garde art.

== History ==
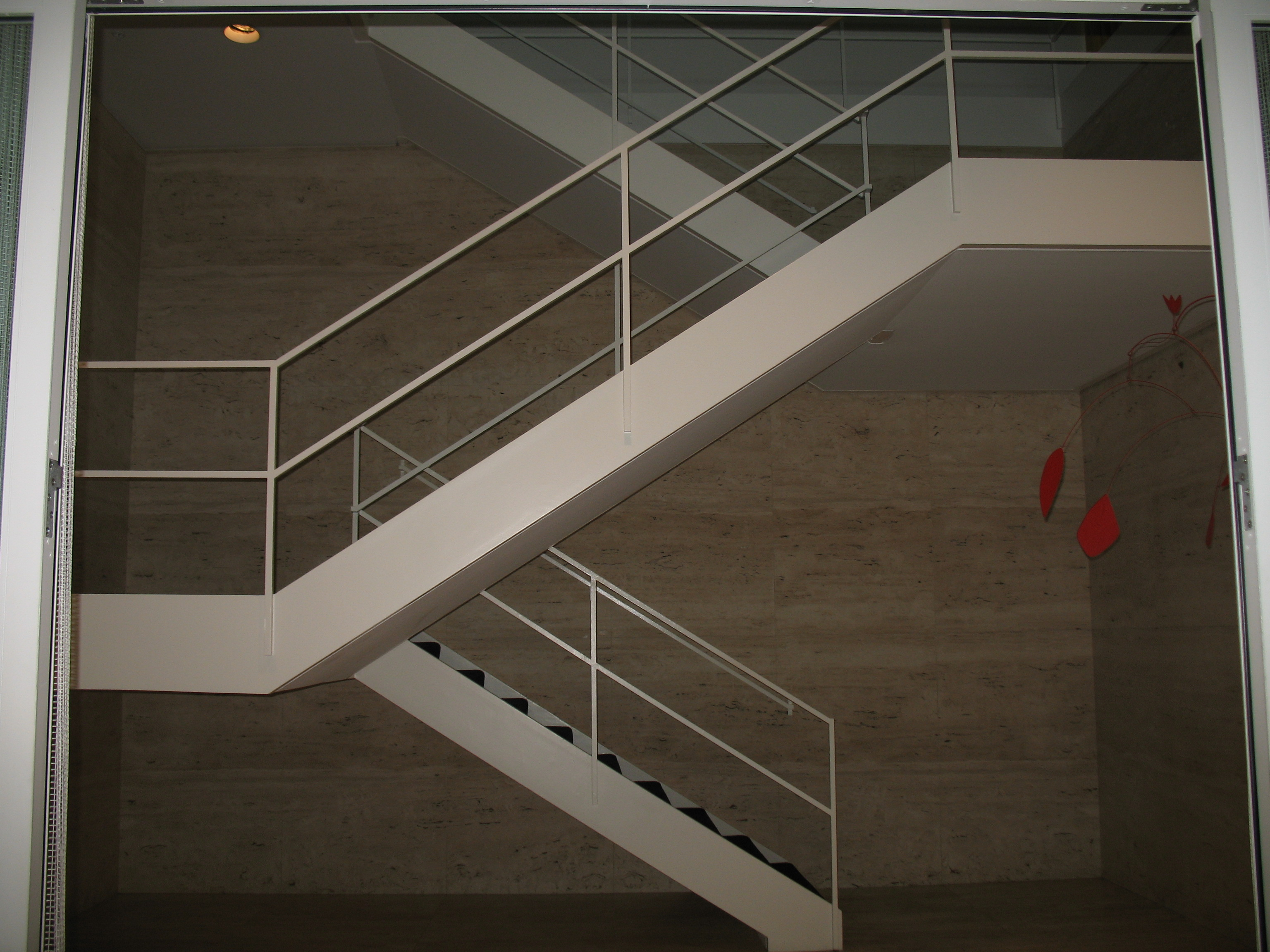
Mies van der Rohe staircase and Alexander Calder mobile

The club was founded in 1916 and experienced its first coverage in the Chicago Tribune on March 16, 1916. It had office space in the Fine Arts Building that became too limiting to serve the club's mission. In 1918, the club elected Rue Winterbotham Carpenter to replace Mrs. Robert McGann as president. She moved the club to 610 South Michigan Avenue. The first exhibition included portraits by Whistler, Renoir, Cassatt, Augustus John and others. By 1922, the club had outgrown its quarters and sponsored supplementary space at the Art Institute of Chicago until 1927 when the cost of doing so became prohibitive. In 1924, the club moved to the north tower of the Wrigley Building. Among its first exhibitions at the Wrigley building was the first major United States show (seventeen sculptures, nineteen drawings and a painting) of Brâncuși. The show was installed by Marcel Duchamp. Rue Carpenter died on December 7, 1931, and Mrs. Charles Goodspeed was elected president in 1932. The club moved to more spacious accommodations at the Wrigley Building in 1936. "Bobsy" Goodspeed served as president until 1940. Then, Rue Winterbotham Carpenter's niece Rue Winterbotham Shaw was elected president. In 1947, the club scaled down its operations for four years after losing its Wrigley Building lease. In 1951, it moved to 109 East Ontario in quarters built to specification that were designed by Ludwig Mies van der Rohe. Using Arts Club furniture, he designed a gallery, dining room, and lecture hall in a pre-existing building. The gallery was built around Constantin Brâncuși's The Golden Bird and the stairway was renowned for its simple elegance. Shaw died in January 1979 and James Phinney Baxter was elected to serve until 1981 when Stanley Freehling was elected.

=== 1990s: new building ===
In the 1990s, the club was located west of Michigan Avenue and behind the 620 building which was home to many of Chicago's finest art dealers including Richard Gray and Richard L. Feigen & Co. The Arts club did not own the land upon which their famous Mies clubhouse was built; instead, the club held the land in a longterm leasehold. In 1990, the owner of 620 N. Michigan and the Arts Club land decided to sell. At first the Arts Club hoped to raise the money to purchase its land along with the 620 N. Michigan Avenue property in an effort spearheaded by Richard Gray, but it quickly became apparent that the club would lose a bidding war over this valuable land. A developer bought the property and demolished the entire block to make way for a movie complex and shopping center.

With the prospect of losing its home, the Arts Club opted to sell one of the most valuable items in its collection to finance the purchase of new land. The club decided to sell Brâncuși's Bird to the Art Institute of Chicago. To finance the purchase, the Art Institute sold several second tier works from its famous Impressionist collection at Sotheby's in guaranteed lots which was a new concept in the auction world in 1990. While without permanent home, the club continued to meet regularly in space loaned by the Casino, another famous Near North Side club.

The 19,000 square feet (1,800 m^{2}) John Vinci designed building is a two-story structure that cost $9 million for the land, building, landscaping, and interior design. The exterior facade is buff brick with black granite windowsills and thresholds and white-painted steel windows. The building features furniture dating back to the club's founding as well as Mies van der Rohe designs. Several elements of the new building's design are considered homages to Mies. The fact that the building was so Miesian thirty years after his death while the club focused on avant-garde art was a bit of a controversy. The building's atrium that allows filtered light into the central galleries and dining areas is its primary feature. Another focal point of the building is the restored Mies van der Rohe steel staircase that provides access to the second floor. The design includes white-painted steel, travertine marble, floor-to-ceiling curtains, dark-stained wood floors, and large areas of glass. The color palette of saffron, black, gray, scarlet, and white is consistent with the former building. Also notable are the veil of north side metal screens. The building also has a 1,600 square feet (150 m^{2}) outdoor landscaped garden. The building accommodates a 200-person audience seating.

== Collection ==
The Arts Club's collection is a combination of acquisitions from its exhibitions and donations from both members and artists. It includes works by Georges Braque, Alexander Calder, Natalia Goncharova, Paul Klee, Henri Matisse, Joan Miró, Henry Moore, Isamu Noguchi, Francis Picabia, and Pablo Picasso. The club has made recent acquisitions of contemporary works by Malcolm Morley, Alex Katz, and Peter Doig. The club maintains a document collection, mostly of correspondence with its artists, at the Newberry Library. Further information on the club collection can be found in The Arts Club of Chicago: The Collection 1916–1996 by Sophia Shaw, granddaughter of the club's dynamic past president Rue Winterbotham Shaw.

=== Highlights ===
Notable works in the club's private collection include:

- Red Petals, plate steel, steel wire, sheet aluminum, soft-iron bolts, and aluminum paint, 1942, by Alexander Calder
- Main Staircase for The Arts Club of Chicago, steel, travertine marble, 1948–1951, by Ludwig Mies van der Rohe
- Untitled, charcoal on ivory laid paper, 1922, by Henri Matisse
- Untitled, black crayon on paper mounted to Masonite, 1932, by Isamu Noguchi
- Personage and Birds in Front of the Sun (Personnage et oiseaux devant le soleil), ink and gouache on paper, 1942, by Joan Miró
- This Thing is Made to Perpetuate My Memory (Cette Chose est faite pour perpetuer mon souvenir), ink, gouache or watercolor, and silver and bronze paint on board, 1915, by Francis Picabia
- Head of a Woman (Tete de femme), red and black chalk with chalk wash on tan laid paper, laid down on lightweight Japanese paper, 1922, by Pablo Picasso

== Exhibitions, performances and lectures ==
Until the Museum of Modern Art was founded in 1929, Chicago and The Arts Club in particular was the most receptive exhibitor of modern art in the United States. At that time, no institution in the United States, especially none in Manhattan, would exhibit European modernism. By renting space at the Art Institute of Chicago's Building the Arts Club was able to arrange showings in Chicago's most prestigious museum.

The club has exhibited an impressive number of well-known 20th century visual artists. Many of the century's most controversial artists made their United States or midwest solo exhibition debuts at the club including: Alexander Calder, Marc Chagall, Salvador Dalí, Jean Dubuffet, Pablo Picasso, Jackson Pollock, Auguste Rodin, Georges Seurat, and Henri Toulouse-Lautrec. In addition, many artists have given lectures at the club, including Martha Graham, Kathleen Battle, Leonard Bernstein, Kenneth Branagh and Robert Altman. Aside from visual artists, the club also has hosted lectures and performances from such prominent musicians as John Cage, Philip Glass, Ramsey Lewis and Igor Stravinsky, and poets W. H. Auden, Gertrude Stein and William Butler Yeats. Most notable among these exhibitions was Picasso's first United States solo exhibition, Original Drawings by Pablo Picasso from March 20 to April 22, 1923, by the Arts Club at its installation at the Art Institute of Chicago. (Picasso's work had first been shown the US in a group show in New York curated by Edward Steichen in 1911.) In the 1930s, when Isamu Noguchi was still known as a sculptor, they hosted him. In 1970 when Varujan Boghosian was a timely sculptor known for depicting the legend of Orpheus, The Arts Club hosted a showing.

== Locations ==
The current location is the club's seventh location. However, this is the first building owned by the club. The location history is listed below.

The first home at the Fine Arts Building had no exhibition space. The club was not able to put on its first exhibition until December 18 when it moved to a location with exhibition space. The club's early gallery spaces were not sufficient to achieve the club's goals and it agreed to assume cost and selection responsibilities for works in a series of shows at The Arts Club Exhibition Room at the Art Institute of Chicago from 1922 to 1927.

Name	Street Address	Years	Architect/Interior Designer
Fine Arts Building	401 S. Michigan Avenue	1916–18	Arthur Heun/Rue Winterbotham Carpenter
	610 S. Michigan Avenue	1918–24	Arthur Heun/Rue Winterbotham Carpenter
Wrigley Building (north tower)	410 N. Michigan Avenue	1924–36	Arthur Heun/Rue Winterbotham Carpenter
Wrigley Building (south tower)	410 N. Michigan Avenue	1936–47	Arthur Heun/Elizabeth "Bobsy" Goodspeed Chapman
	109 E. Ontario Street	1951–95	Ludwig Mies van der Rohe
	222 W. Superior Street	1995–97	
	201 E. Ontario Street	1997–	Vinci/Hamp Architects, Inc.

== Leadership ==
The club has had eleven presidents:

Name	Years
Mrs. Robert McGann	1916–1918
Rue Winterbotham Carpenter	1918–1931
Elizabeth "Bobsy" Goodspeed	1932–1940
Mrs. William B. Hale	1940
Rue Winterbotham Shaw	1940–1979
Mrs. Roger Barnett	1979
James Phinney Baxter IV	1979–1981
Stanley M. Freehling	1981–2005
Marilynn B. Alsdorf	2006–2011
Sophia Shaw	2011–2013
Helyn Goldenberg	2013–2017
Dale Pinkert	2017–2020
Laura Washington	2020–2023
Charles (Chip) Mottier	2023–

== Dues ==
A two-tiered dues system, established at The Arts Club's inception, is maintained to this day: professional members pay lower dues than patrons, ensuring that fine and performing artists remain a vital component of The Arts Club membership.
