= Bernhard Ziehn =

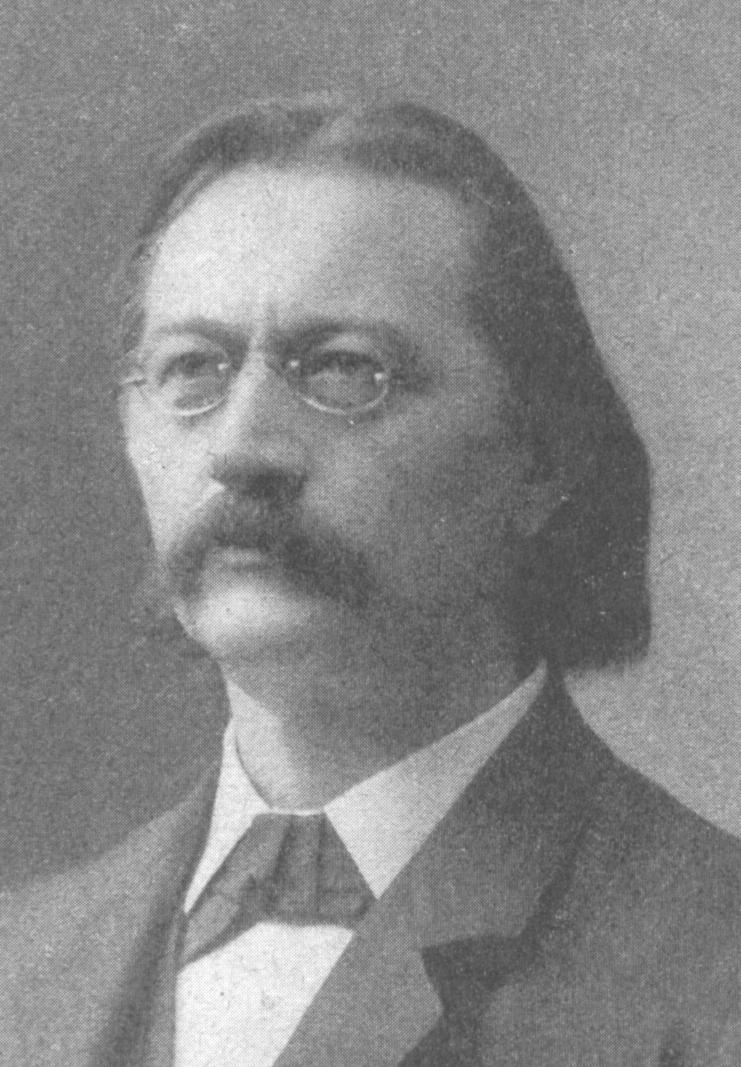
- Bernhard in 1907
- Born: January 20, 1845; Erfurt, Germany
- Died: September 8, 1912 (aged 67); Chicago, Illinois

Bernhard Ziehn (January 20, 1845 – September 8, 1912) was a German-American music theorist and music teacher.

== Biography ==
Ziehn was born in Erfurt, Germany. As he was trained to be a schoolteacher, music education played only a small part in his upbringing. Initially he taught briefly at Mühlhausen before emigrating.

He arrived in Chicago in 1868, teaching mathematics, German, history, and music at the German Lutheran School from 1868 through 1871. After a stint as an organist for a synagogue, he became a private teacher, publishing an extensive number of musical and theoretical articles. His first theoretical works were published in 1881.

His students included John Alden Carpenter, Wilhelm Middelschulte, Hugo Kaun, Fannie Bloomfield Zeisler, Eleanor Everest Freer, Glenn Dillard Gunn, Julius Gold, Grace Chadbourne, Regina Watson, and Otto Wolf. See: List of music students by teacher: T to Z#Bernhard Ziehn.

Ziehn died in Chicago, Illinois.

== Theories ==
Ziehn refused to use Helmholtz's theory of harmonic structure based on physical phenomena. Rather, his ideas were based not on natural science, but on music itself. This was in contradistinction to Hugo Riemann who sought to base his rationales on "scientific" reasoning (not entirely consistently).

He praised Anton Bruckner while condemning Hugo Riemann, Eduard Hanslick and Phillipp Spitta. His ideas were admired by Hans von Bülow, Hugo Kaun, Leopold Godowsky, Ferruccio Busoni, George P. Upton and others. Theodore Thomas reportedly changed details of his interpretations based on discussions with Ziehn. Kyle Gann, a fan of Ziehn's music and theories, says both that he, "had a considerable influence on the pre-war Chicago scene," and that, "his obsessive musical mind has been forgotten because he lived in Chicago, wrote in German, and was just too far ahead of his time."

== Writings ==
- System der Uebungen für Clavierspieler und ein Lehrgang für den ersten Unterricht/System of Exercises for Pianoforte and a New Method of Instruction for Beginners (Hamburg, 1881) [bilingual edn]
- Harmonie- und Modulationslehre (Berlin, 1887).

Manual of Harmony (Milwaukee, 1907).

- Five- and Six-part Harmonies/Fünf- und Sechsstimmige Harmonien (Milwaukee and Berlin, 1911) [bilingual edn]
- Canonical Studies: a New Technic in Composition/Canonische Studien: eine neue Compositions-Technik. (Milwaukee and Berlin, 1912 [bilingual edn]; abridged in Eng. as Canonic Studies, London, 1976);
- ed. J. Goebel: 'Gesammelte Aufsätze zur Geschichte und Theorie der Musik von Bernhard Ziehn', Jahrbuch der Deutsch-Amerikanischen Historischen Gesellschaft von Illinois, xxvi–xxvii (1926–7) [double issue devoted chiefly to a collection of Ziehn's articles, with introduction by J. Goebel and 2 essays by T. Otterstrom
