= Rolling Rock Club =

Private country club in Laughlintown, Pennsylvania

Rolling Rock Club is a private country club located on 25,000 acres (10,000 ha) along U.S. Route 30 about 50 miles (80 km) SE of Pittsburgh, in Laughlintown, Pennsylvania, Ligonier Valley.

== History ==
Rolling Rock Club was originally 12,000 acres (4,900 ha) of land owned by Judge Thomas Mellon, who left it to his son Richard Beatty Mellon, brother of Andrew Mellon and onetime president of Mellon Bank. Richard Beatty Mellon turned Rolling Rock into a rural retreat for his friends and family to hunt, fish, and ride. From this, it steadily developed into an establishment that, in addition to the usual country club necessities — swimming pool and golf course — also boasted stocked trout streams, duck ponds, game birds, and shooting ranges. The club also kept a pack of English fox hounds, raised pheasants, and ran the Gold Cup Steeplechase (from 1933 until 1983). R.B. Mellon left the estate to his son, Richard King Mellon, when he died in 1933. In the middle of the twentieth century, Rolling Rock Club hunted over 75,000 acres (30,000 ha), mostly owned by 240 farmers whose acres surround the Mellon 18,000 acres.

== Golf course ==
Rolling Rock Golf Course
- Interactive map of Rolling Rock Golf Course
- 40°12′24.41″N 79°12′31.49″W

Club information
- Location: Laughlintown, Pennsylvania, Ligonier Valley
- Established: 1917
- Type: Private
- Tota holes: 18
- Fairways: Bent grass

Rolling Rock
- Designed by: Donald Ross (1917), Brian M. Silva (1997)
- Par: 70
- Length: 6,176
- Course rating: 69.7
- Slope rating: 122

The golf course at Rolling Rock Club in Laughlintown, Pennsylvania, was designed by Donald Ross and was built as a nine-hole course in 1917. The club opened nine new holes, designed by Brian Silva, in May 1997. The course totals 6,176 yards from the back tees. With only two water hazards in the form of environmentally sensitive areas, there are plenty of sand bunkers. The greens are undulating, and the fairways are tree-lined.

== The Hunt Stables ==
The Hunt Stables were designed by Pittsburgh architect Benno Janssen and originally built in 1921 to house 28 stalls, a tack room, a veterinarian's area, grooms' quarters, food storage, equipment rooms, and a great round room where trophies and ribbons were displayed. With an intent to preserve the landmark of its heritage, in 1984, the building was converted into private condominiums, preserving as much of the existing architecture as possible. Every unit has its own entrance and individual identity and is autonomous with respect to neighboring units. Vestibules and fenestrated entrance hall additions were designed to increase the area to an average of 2,400 square feet (220 m^{2}) per unit. The private resort also features overnight accommodations.
