= Regina Watson =

German-American pianist and composer (1845–1913)

Regina Cohn Watson (April 23, 1845 – July 31, 1913) was a composer, pianist, and teacher who was born in Germany. Her family later moved to America, first to Detroit, then to Chicago, where Regina lived for the rest of her life. In 1873, she married Lewis H. Watson, a Civil War veteran who had fought with an infantry unit from Maine.

Regina Watson studied music with Franz Liszt and Karl Tausig in Europe, and with Bernhard Ziehn, probably in Chicago. After she moved to America, she gave lecture recitals on topics such as medieval French music, Italian music, and folk songs. She performed as a piano soloist in recitals and with orchestras. She belonged to the American Society of Composers, Authors and Publishers (ASCAP) and helped found the Musical Art Society of Chicago.

Watson is best remembered today as a piano teacher. Her students included Teresa Carreno, Elizabeth Sprague Coolidge, Phyllis Fergus Hoyt, Peter Lutkin, Veronica Murphy, and Theodora Sturkow-Ryder.

Elizabeth Sprague Coolidge organized an effort in 1916 to build and name a studio at the MacDowell Colony in Watson's memory. Composer Amy Beach used the Regina Watson Studio during her residency at the Colony. It was renovated in 1993 and became the MacDowell Colony's first barrier-free studio that was accessible to everyone.

Watson's music was published by the Clayton F. Summy Company. Her compositions include:

== Piano ==
- Arabian Night
- Bourree la Gigue
- Cradle Song
- Dansons la Gigue
- Mazourka Etude
- Mignon, a Portrait
- Scherzino

== Vocal ==
- "Aus Drang und Lieb fuer Dich"
- "Countess Laura" (text by George Henry Boker)
- "Cupid's Blunder"
- "Explanation"
- "Lune Blanche"
