= Laughlintown, Pennsylvania =

Unincorporated community in Pennsylvania, US

- Unincorporated community
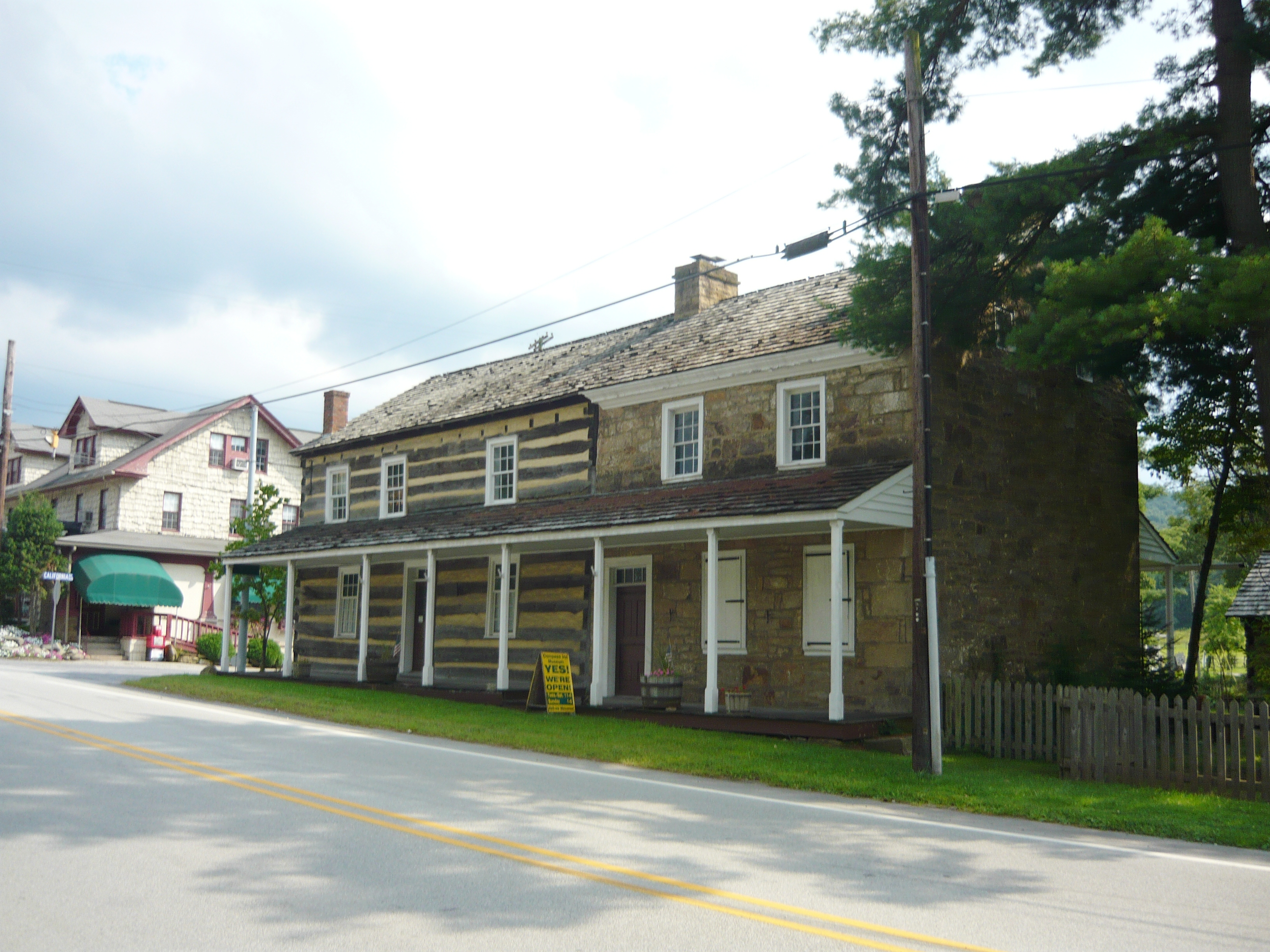
- The Compass Inn in Laughlintown

- Location within Pennsylvania
- Coordinates: 40°12′43″N 79°11′52″W
- Country: United States
- State: Pennsylvania
- County: Westmoreland
- Elevation: 1,289 ft (393 m)
- Time zone: UTC-5 (Eastern (EST))
  - Summer (DST): UTC-4 (EDT)
- ZIP code: 15655
- Area code: 724
- GNIS feature ID: 1178918

Laughlintown is an unincorporated community that is located in Ligonier Township, Westmoreland County, Pennsylvania, United States. It is located on U.S. Route 30, 3 miles (4.8 km) southeast of Ligonier.

The town is named after a person named Robert Laughlin.

== History and demographics ==
Laughlintown has a post office with ZIP code 15655, which opened on May 16, 1825.

It presently has a population of roughly 332, according to the most recent U.S. census, which was completed in 2020.

== Notable features ==
The Compass Inn, which is listed on the National Register of Historic Places, is located in Laughlintown, as are the Rolling Rock Club and The Washington Furnace Inn.
