= The Pale Blue Eye (novel) =

2006 novel by American writer Louis Bayard

- Author: Louis Bayard
- Genre: Mystery
- Published: 2006

The Pale Blue Eye is a 2006 novel by American writer Louis Bayard. The book is a murder mystery set at West Point in 1830, where the young Edgar Allan Poe was a cadet. The novel was nominated for both an Edgar and a Dagger. It was adapted into a film by writer-director Scott Cooper and stars Christian Bale and Harry Melling.
