= The Pale Blue Eye =

2022 American film directed by Scott Cooper

- Release poster
- Directed by: Scott Cooper
- Screenplay by: Scott Cooper
- Based on: The Pale Blue Eye by Louis Bayard
- Produced by: Scott Cooper; Christian Bale; John Lesher; Tyler Thompson
- Starring: Christian Bale; Harry Melling; Gillian Anderson; Lucy Boynton; Robert Duvall
- Cinematography: Masanobu Takayanagi
- Edited by: Dylan Tichenor
- Music by: Howard Shore
- Production companies: Cross Creek Pictures; Streamline Global Group; Le Grisbi Productions
- Distributed by: Netflix
- Release dates: December 23, 2022 (United States); January 6, 2023 (Netflix)
- Running time: 130 minutes
- Country: United States
- Language: English
- Budget: $72 million

The Pale Blue Eye is a 2022 American period mystery gothic thriller film written and directed by Scott Cooper, adapted from the 2006 novel by Louis Bayard. Set in 1830, the film stars Christian Bale as veteran detective Augustus Landor as he investigates a series of murders at the West Point Military Academy with the aid of Edgar Allan Poe (Harry Melling), a young military cadet. The ensemble cast also features Gillian Anderson, Lucy Boynton, Charlotte Gainsbourg, Toby Jones, Harry Lawtey, Simon McBurney, Timothy Spall, and Robert Duvall in his last movie before his death in 2026.

The Pale Blue Eye was released in select theaters on December 23, 2022, before its streaming release on January 6, 2023, by Netflix. The film received mixed reviews.

== Plot ==
In October 1830, alcoholic retired detective Augustus Landor is asked by the military to investigate the hanging of Cadet Leroy Fry at the United States Military Academy. Landor is a widower whose daughter Mattie ran off two years before.

After Fry was hanged, his heart had been removed from his body. Examining the corpse, Landor finds a small fragment of a note in Fry's hand. Dr. Daniel Marquis, the examining physician, suggest that he did not hang himself but was murdered. Landor secretly enlists the help of Edgar Allan Poe, another cadet at the academy. Poe and Landor deduce that the note was summoning Fry to a secret meeting. After a cow and a sheep are found butchered with their hearts removed, it is suspected that the murder could be linked to black magic rituals.

Another cadet, Ballinger, is found hanged with his heart and genitals removed. A third cadet, Stoddard, disappears; Landor tells the authorities that he presumes Stoddard had reason to believe he was next in line to be killed. Landor and Poe suspect the family of Dr. Daniel Marquis, who performed the autopsy on Fry. Particular suspicion is on his son Artemus and his daughter Lea, who suffers from random seizures. Landor confronts Dr. Marquis, who admits that he resorted to black magic to cure Lea of her seizures.

Poe is drugged and finds Artemus and Lea about to cut out his heart in accordance with the ritual. Landor rescues Poe, but the building catches fire and Lea and Artemus die. Thinking that the case is solved, the military thanks Landor for his service. However, Poe confronts Landor with his realization that the handwriting on the note fragment in Fry's hand matches that of Landor. It becomes apparent that Landor was the killer of the cadets.

Two years earlier, Landor's daughter Mattie was raped by Fry, Ballinger, and Stoddard after attending her first ball. Traumatized, she killed herself by jumping off a cliff. Landor pretended that she ran away. Distraught, he set out to avenge his daughter. He left the note for Fry, luring him to a lonely spot before getting the other two's names out of him and hanging him. A patrol happened to walk by so he was forced to leave the body there. Lea and Artemus stole Fry's heart for their ritual. After killing Ballinger, Landor mutilated his corpse to make it appear that the cadet had been murdered by the same "madman" who desecrated Fry's body, whilst he hopes that - though he has been unable to kill Stoddard - the rape will remain on his conscience for the rest of his life.

Poe tells Landor he has two notes with handwriting samples that link Landor directly to the murders, but burns them instead. Landor later stands at the cliff where his daughter leapt to her death. He lets her hair ribbon float away in the wind, saying "Rest, my love".

== Cast ==
- Christian Bale as Augustus Landor
- Harry Melling as Cadet Edgar Allan Poe
- Gillian Anderson as Mrs. Julia Marquis
- Lucy Boynton as Lea Marquis
- Charlotte Gainsbourg as Patsy
- Toby Jones as Dr. Daniel Marquis
- Harry Lawtey as Cadet Artemus Marquis
- Simon McBurney as Captain Hitchcock
- Hadley Robinson as Mattie Landor
- Timothy Spall as Superintendent Thayer
- Robert Duvall as Jean Pepe
- Joey Brooks as Cadet Stoddard
- Brennan Keel Cook as Cadet Huntoon
- Gideon Glick as Cadet Haratio Cochrane
- Fred Hechinger as Cadet Randolph Ballinger
- Matt Helm as Cadet Llewellyn Lee
- Jack Irving as Cadet Hamilton
- Mathias Goldstein as Lieutenant Locke
- Steven Maier as Cadet Fry
- Charlie Tahan as Cadet Loughborough

In addition, John Fetterman and Gisele Barreto Fetterman, then Lieutenant Governor and Second Lady of Pennsylvania, appear as a couple in an uncredited cameo.

== Production ==
In 2011, Scott Cooper signed on to write and direct an adaptation of Louis Bayard's novel of the same name for Fox 2000.

A decade later, in early 2021, it was announced that Christian Bale would star in the film, to be produced by Cross Creek Pictures. It was to be Bale and Cooper's third film together, after Out of the Furnace and Hostiles. Bale and Cooper were also set to produce with John Lesher and Tyler Thompson. Netflix acquired rights to the film for around US$55 million at the European Film Market. In June 2021, it was reported that Harry Melling would co-star as Edgar Allan Poe.

Filming began on November 29, 2021 at the historic Compass Inn in Laughlintown, Pennsylvania. In December, filming took place at Westminster College in New Wilmington, Pennsylvania. That month, additional cast members were announced, including Gillian Anderson, Lucy Boynton, Timothy Spall, Fred Hechinger, and Robert Duvall.

Sitting US Senator John Fetterman and his wife Gisele Barreto Fetterman are extras in a scene in the film. They became friendly with Bale and Cooper in 2013 while they were filming Out of the Furnace in Braddock, Pennsylvania, where Fetterman was mayor at the time. Bale stated, "John's got this fantastic face, hulking figure... So I said to Scott, 'We've got to have him in the tavern... That's a face that fits in the 1830s.'"

== Release ==
The Pale Blue Eye was released in select theaters on December 23, 2022, before its streaming release on January 6, 2023, by Netflix.

== Reception ==
On the review aggregator website Rotten Tomatoes, 63% of 182 critics' reviews are positive, with an average rating of 6/10. The website's consensus reads: "The Pale Blue Eye lacks its source material's piercing gaze, but this well-cast mystery is just intriguing enough to investigate." Metacritic, which uses a weighted average, assigned the film a score of 56 out of 100, based on 40 critics, indicating "mixed or average" reviews.

Matthew Monagle of The Austin Chronicle wrote, "The Pale Blue Eye holds together remarkably as a gothic piece of horror... right up to the point that it doesn't," and that it "seems to lose its nerve in its final minutes, when Cooper's script reverts to a procedural story and reshuffles our relationships to both main characters, relying too heavily on red herrings – and ugly tropes of sexual violence – to bring the narrative home. Indeed, the entire film damn near falls apart."

James Verniere of the Boston Herald called it an "over-acted, badly written, murder mystery dud." Peter Travers of ABC News wrote: "Even when the murderer kills again and characters start daubing their faces with blood and howling at the moon or whatever's handy, the film keeps circling its convoluted plot without finding a satisfying place to land."

=== Accolades ===
The film was nominated for Outstanding Supporting Visual Effects in a Photoreal Feature at the 21st Visual Effects Society Awards.

== See also ==
- Edgar Allan Poe bibliography
- Edgar Allan Poe in popular culture
- The Raven
