= Dynamite Kablammo =

Dynamite Kablammo (also referred to as DK) is a sketch comedy group based in the San Fernando Valley, established in 2006 by Greg Kaczynski, Matt DeNoto, and Candida Rodriguez. Dana DeRuyck, Dane Biren and Meredith Rensa are also members. DeNoto and Kaczynski write the shows with DeRuyck occasionally contributing.

DK's shows have a heavy technical side, requiring many visual and audio cues, and so they also maintain an audio/visual technician in the group, initially John Nobori, but replaced by Adam Neubauer in August 2007.

== Style and influences ==
Their style takes typical sketch comedy basics and keeps the time of each sketch down to a minimum. Sketches will run as short as 30 seconds to occasionally as long as four minutes, with an average of 20+ sketches being produced in an hour-long show, often showcasing "premises that splinter off in clever and unexpected directions.". Their writing style precludes any and all topical humor, striving instead for absurdity, literary sketches, and cleverness. Every show contains at least one song written and composed by DeNoto.

Among their influences, the members cite Monty Python, The Kids in the Hall, The State, The Simpsons, and Arrested Development.

== History and Acclaim ==
Their first show premiered at Zombie Joe's Underground in North Hollywood on August 17, 2006. Even though Rodriguez is no longer with the group, as of August 2008, Dynamite Kablammo has put up 5 original shows, several "Best Of" shows, participated in the North Hollywood Arts festival, and attended the Rogue Festival in Fresno, CA. These shows have been critically acclaimed from such notable news outlets as the LA Weekly and Back Stage West.

That initial show was nominated for three Artistic Director Achievement Awards in the North Hollywood arts district including Best Director, Best Ensemble (comedy), and Best Production (comedy). The original song from the first show, "Everybody Hates", was featured on the Huffington Post.

The second show, which opened January 18, 2007, was extended because of sold-out crowds.

Before the third show was finished, Candida Rodriguez left the group and the acting industry behind completely. The following two shows were run with the remaining four members.

In January 2008, the fourth show was mounted with a title, something Dynamite Kablammo had not done before. It was called "Are You Delicious?", received critical praise, and decent box office.

In March 2008, Dynamite Kablammo went to the Rogue Festival in Fresno where they had a 6-show sold-out run. The show was also a critical success receiving glowing reviews

In July 2008, they returned to having five members by recruiting Meredith Rensa. They also debuted their fifth original show, "You Will Most Likely Die", which also received critical acclaim from the Los Angeles press.

After five acclaimed shows, Dynamite Kablammo hung up their pens and costumes and officially disbanded on January 1, 2009. Internal disagreements over funds and vision were central to the split accompanied by burn-out. Since the split, members have gone on to do remarkable solo work. Greg Kaczynski continues to work in theater around Los Angeles, he writes and teaches full-time. Matt DeNoto continues to write, working on screenplays and creating short comedic videos under the moniker Furious Molecules while still active with his band, Hollywood Trash. Candi Rodriguez has returned to acting and is very active in Los Angeles theater, working on solo projects; in the fall of 2008, she and Kaczynski collaborated on a critically acclaimed and financially successful clown show, "Nose Tales". Dana DeRuyck is very active in theater and film in the Los Angeles area, never having a moment to rest. Dane Biren is very active in Los Angeles theater, hoping to break into Broadway. After a period of being very active in local theater, Meredith Rensa is now raising a family. She intends on returning to acting when settled.

In the spring of 2010, Matt DeNoto finished the lengthy project of compiling, editing, and organizing DVDs of the group's five original shows. On Saturday, March 27, 2010, he gathered - for the first time ever - every single member of the Dynamite Kablammo creative team (including Neubauer and Nobori) to record a commentary track for the DVD set.

There are no current plans for Dynamite Kablammo to reunite.

== Other media ==
Over the years, they have also produced several shorts which have garnered hundreds of thousands of viewers on sites like YouTube. In addition, the group is currently posting classic sketches taped during the live shows every week on their dedicated DK YouTube channel.
