= John Alden Carpenter =

American composer (1876–1951)

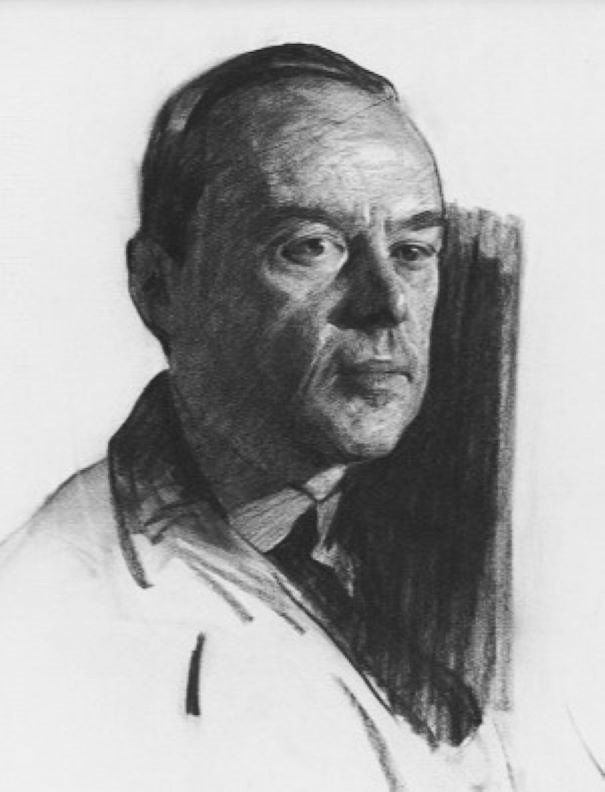
- Detail from an unfinished portrait of Carpenter, c. 1921
- Born: February 28, 1876; Park Ridge, Illinois, U.S.
- Died: April 26, 1951 (aged 75); Chicago, Illinois, U.S.
- Occupations: Composer; pianist
- Spouses: Rue Winterbotham (m. 1901; died 1931) Ellen Borden (m. 1931)
- Children: 1

John Alden Carpenter (February 28, 1876 – April 26, 1951) was an American composer. Carpenter's compositional style was considered to be mainly "mildly modernistic and impressionistic"; many of his works strive to encompass the spirit of America, including the patriotic The Home Road and several other jazz-inspired works. He was among the first classical composers to incorporate elements of jazz and ragtime in their pieces.

== Biography ==
Carpenter was born in Park Ridge, Illinois on February 28, 1876 as a son of an American industrialist, and raised in a musical household. He was educated at Harvard University, where he studied under John Knowles Paine, and was president of the Glee Club, also writing music for the Hasty-Pudding Club. Showing great promise as a composer, he had a few lessons with Edward Elgar during a trip to Rome in 1906. later returning to the United States to study under Bernhard Ziehn in Chicago through 1912. It was there he earned a comfortable living as vice-president of the family business, a shipping supply company, from 1909 to his retirement in 1936. After his retirement, he spent much of his time composing. Carpenter served as Chairman of the Board of Children's Home Society of Illinois and a life trustee of the Children's Home Society of Illinois Foundation. He died in Chicago on April 26, 1951.

== Works ==
Carpenter composed three ballets: Krazy Kat: A Jazz Pantomime, based on the Krazy Kat comics, was premiered at the New York Town Hall on 20 January 1922, and was the first work by a concert composer to use the word 'jazz' in its title; possibly his best-known is Skyscrapers (1926), set in New York (it premiered at the Metropolitan Opera), but equally inspired by his native Chicago.

One of his most famous works was 1914's impressionistic orchestral suite Adventures in a Perambulator. It was recorded in stereo in 1956 by Howard Hanson and the Eastman-Rochester Orchestra for Mercury Records, which initially released it on LP; Philips later reissued the recording on CD. In 1932, Carpenter completed Song of Faith for the George Washington bicentennial. His first symphony (Symphony No. 1, in C) was premiered in Norfolk Connecticut in 1917 and revised for the 50th anniversary of the Chicago Symphony Orchestra, who performed it on October 24, 1940. Bruno Walter premiered his second symphony with the New York Philharmonic in 1942. He also wrote many piano pieces and songs, including the song cycle Gitanjali, with poems by Rabindranath Tagore.

His piano works include a Sonata, a Nocturne, a Polonaise, an Impromptu clearly inspired by Debussy, a Minuet and several other shorts pieces recorded in 1986 by Denver Oldham for New World Records.

== Recordings ==
Carpenter made two published commercial sound recordings. In December 1927, he joined the mezzo-soprano Mina Hager to record the voice and piano version of his set of Water-Colors (settings of four ancient Chinese poems in English translations) for a small subscription label, the Chicago Gramophone Society. In April 1932, Carpenter recorded the spoken narration in his Song of Faith with the Chicago A Cappella Choir, the Philadelphia Orchestra and conductor Noble Cain, for Victor. Carpenter made at least one private, non-commercial recording; it is possible that one or more private or off-air recordings of his performances also survive, for instance among the Mina Hager papers in Chicago.

== Honors ==
Carpenter was the recipient of many honors during his lifetime:

- He was a member of Phi Mu Alpha Sinfonia music fraternity
- He was made a Chevalier of the French Legion of Honor in 1921
- He received an honorary M.A. from Harvard in 1922
- He received an honorary Mus. Doc. from the University of Wisconsin in 1933
- He was elected a Fellow of the American Academy of Arts and Sciences in 1933.
- He was awarded the Gold Medal of the National Institute of Arts and Letters in 1947

== Personal life ==
In 1901, Carpenter married Rue Winterbotham, and they had one daughter, Genevieve Baldwin Carpenter, later Genevieve Carpenter Hill. After his wife's death in 1931, he married Ellen Borden.
