= Louis Bayard =

American author

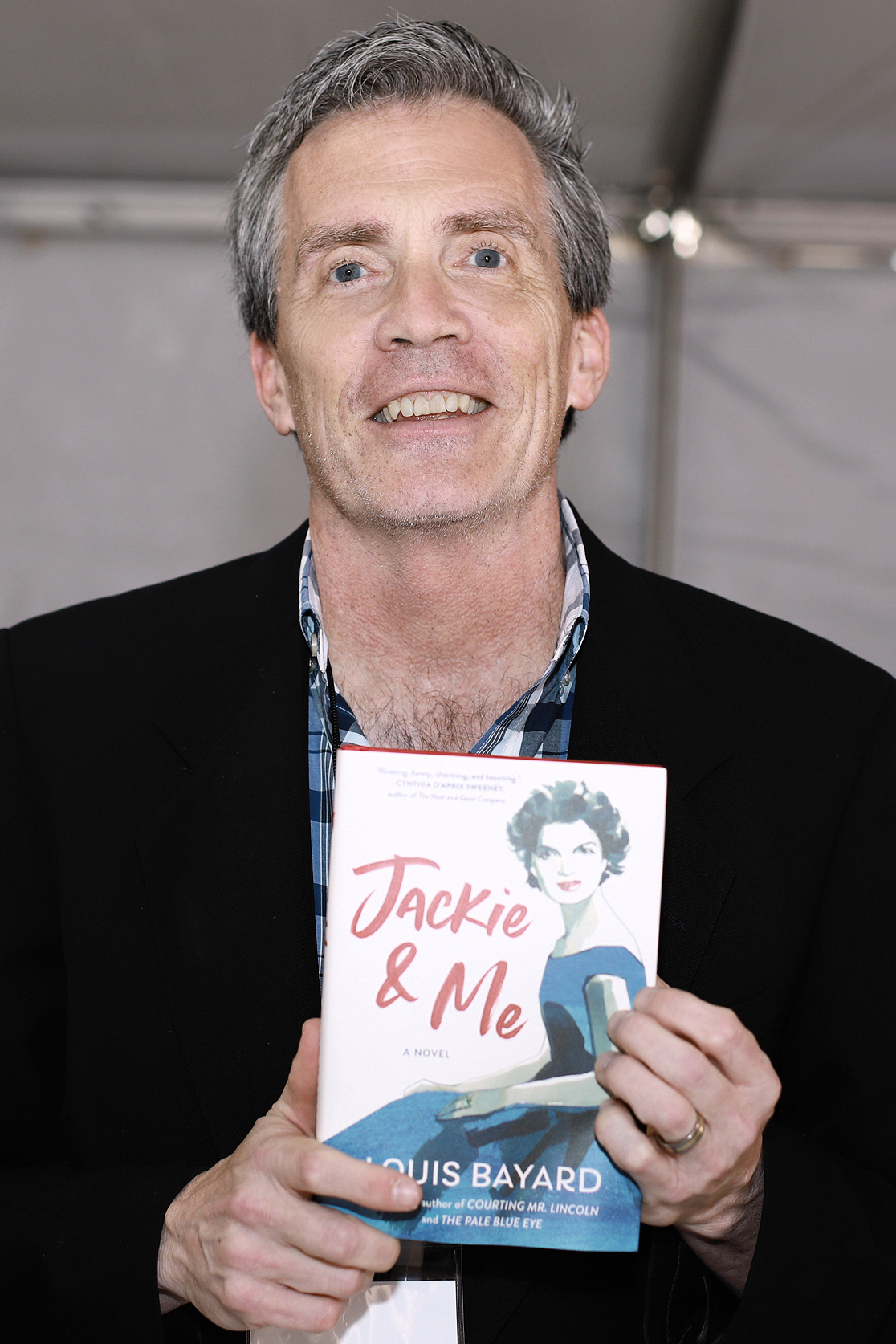
- Bayard at the 2022 Texas Book Festival
- Born: November 30, 1963 (age 62); Albuquerque, New Mexico, U.S.
- Education: Princeton University, B.A. Northwestern University, M.A.
- Occupations: Journalist; novelist
- Spouse: Don Montuori (c. 1988–present)
- Children: 2
- Website: louisbayard.com

Louis Bayard (born November 30, 1963) is an American author. His historical mysteries include The Pale Blue Eye, Mr. Timothy, The Black Tower, The School of Night, and Roosevelt's Beast, and they have been translated into 11 languages.

His novel The Pale Blue Eye was adapted into a film of the same name, and released in January 2023.

== Biography ==
Bayard was born on November 30, 1963, in Albuquerque, New Mexico, and grew up in Northern Virginia. He graduated from Princeton University and received a master's degree in journalism from Northwestern University. He lives in Washington, D.C., and teaches fiction writing at George Washington University.

He was a staffer at the U.S. House of Representatives, working for Delegate Eleanor Holmes Norton (D-D.C.) and as press secretary for then Representative Phil Sharp (D-Indiana).

== Career ==
Bayard's first two novels, Fool's Errand (1999) and Endangered Species (2001), were romantic comedies with modern settings. His third novel, Mr. Timothy, published by HarperCollins, was a Victorian thriller featuring a grown-up Tiny Tim from Dickens' A Christmas Carol. Bayard's novel was a New York Times Notable book and was chosen one of the 10 best books of the year by People magazine. His 2006 novel The Pale Blue Eye is a murder mystery set at West Point in 1830, where the young Edgar Allan Poe was a cadet. The book was nominated for an Edgar (2007) and a Dagger. It was optioned for a film adaptation by writer-director Scott Cooper. Bayard's fifth novel, The Black Tower (Morrow), set in Paris in 1818, follows the real-life detective Eugène François Vidocq as he investigates the mystery surrounding Marie Antoinette's son. His novel The School of Night (2010) shuttles between modern-day Washington, D.C., and Elizabethan England, where a group of scholars including Walter Ralegh, Christopher Marlowe, and the scientist Thomas Harriot explore dangerous questions. Roosevelt's Beast was published on March 18, 2014. It tells of an action adventure involving Theodore Roosevelt and his son, Kermit, through Brazil's Da Dúvida River circa 1914.

Bayard has also written book reviews and essays for The Washington Post, The New York Times, Salon and Nerve. He has appeared at the National Book Festival, and he has written the New York Times recaps for Downton Abbey and Wolf Hall. He was the keynote speaker for 1455 StoryFest (2022).

== Novels ==
- Fool's Errand (1st ed.). Los Angeles: Alyson Books. 1999. ISBN 1-55583-494-9. LCCN 98055139.
- Endangered Species: A Novel (1st ed.). Los Angeles: Alyson Books. 2001. ISBN 1-55583-641-0. LCCN 2001022614.
- Mr. Timothy: A Novel (1st ed.). New York: HarperCollins. 2003. ISBN 0-06-053421-4. LCCN 2003042327.
- The Pale Blue Eye: A Novel (1st ed.). New York: HarperCollins. 2006. ISBN 0-06-073397-7. LCCN 2005044741.
- The Black Tower (1st ed.). New York: William Morrow. 2008. ISBN 978-0-06-117350-9. LCCN 2008005059.
- The School of Night: A Novel (1st ed.). New York: Henry Holt and Co. 2010. ISBN 978-0-8050-9069-7. LCCN 2010024961.
- Roosevelt's Beast: A Novel (First ed.). New York: Henry Holt and Co. 2014. ISBN 978-0-8050-9070-3. LCCN 2013028721.
- Lucky Strikes (1st ed.). New York City: Henry Holt and Co. 2016. ISBN 978-1-62779-390-2.
- Courting Mr. Lincoln (1st ed.). New York City: Henry Holt and Co. 2019. ISBN 978-1-61620-847-9.
- Jackie & Me (1st ed.). New York City: Algonquin Books. 2022. ISBN 978-1-64375-035-4.
