= List of compositions by Margaret Bonds =

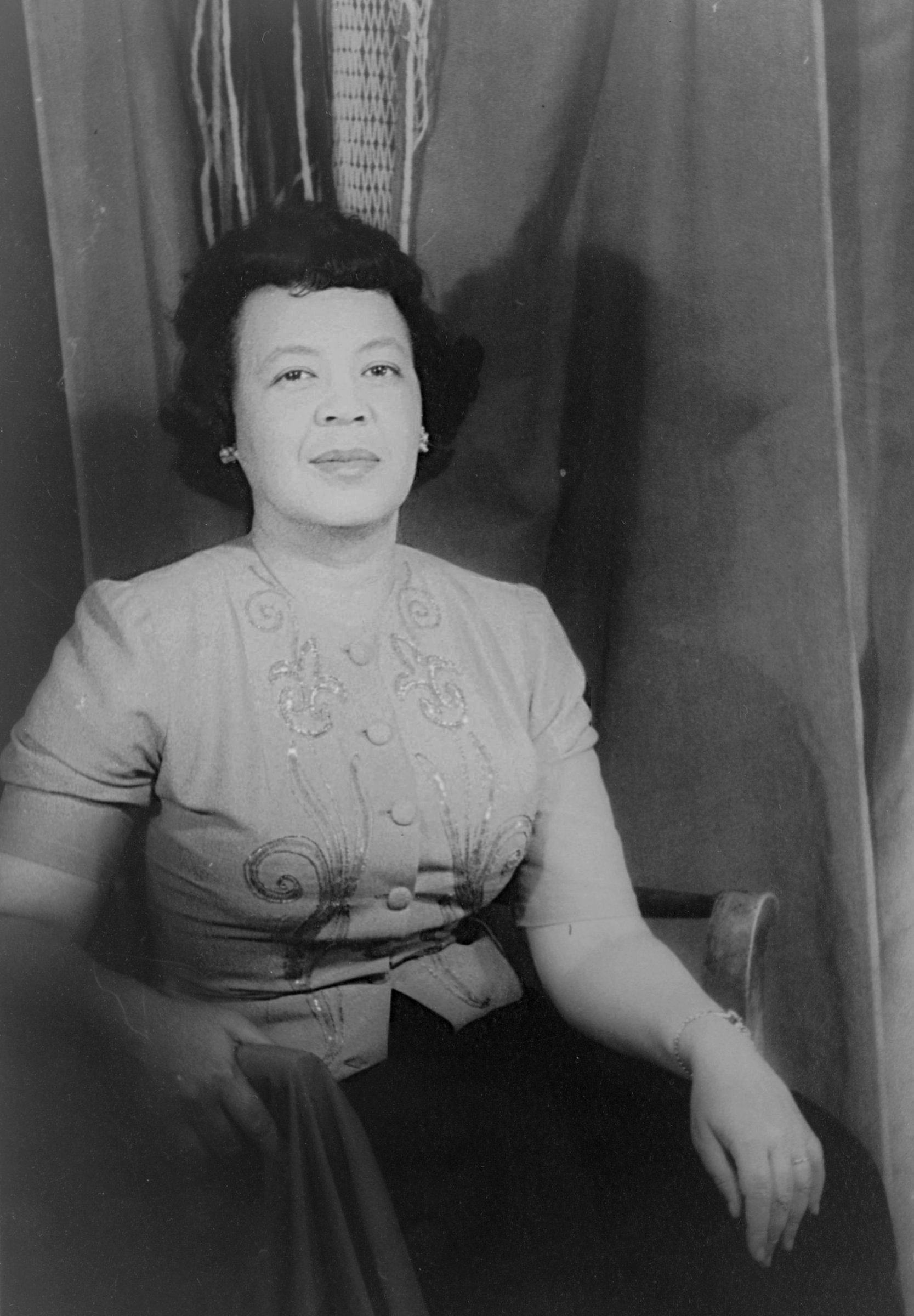
Bonds in 1956

This is a list of compositions by Margaret Bonds (1913–1972).

== By genre ==
=== Orchestral works (including with voice) ===
- Spirituals five for high voice and orchestra (1942)
- Joshua Fit De Battle of Jericho, voice and orchestra (1959)
- Montgomery Variations (1964)
- Nile Fantasy for piano and orchestra (1967)
- Scripture reading for narrator and orchestra (1971)

=== Pieces for piano ===
- Lillian M. Bowles: For the piano
- Troubled water (1967)
- Two Piano Pieces
1. "Tangamerican"
2. "Fugal Dance
- Spiritual Suite
- Waltz from the notebook of a ballet accompanist

=== Other instrumental works ===
- Quintet for Piano and Strings (1933)
- I want Jesus to walk with me for Cello and Piano (1964)

=== Choral pieces ===
- The Ballad of the Brown King (SATB, tenor solo), Text: Langston Hughes (1954)
- Children's sleep (SATB), Text: Vernon Glasser
- Credo (soprano solo, baritone solo, SATB chorus, piano) (1966), Text: W. E. B. Du Bois
- Credo (soprano solo, baritone solo, SATB chorus, orchestra) (1967), text: W. E. B. Du Bois
- Touch the Hem of His Garment (S solo, SATB chorus, piano) (1968). Text: Janice Lovoos. (see also under "Pieces for Solo Voice")
- No Man Has Seen His Face (S or T solo, SATB chorus, piano) (1968). Text: Janice Lovoos. (see also under "Pieces for Solo Voice")
- Ezek'el saw de wheel
- Go tell it on the mountain
- Hold on
- I shall pass through this world (a capella)
- Mary had a little baby (SSAA)
- The Negro speaks of rivers (1962), Text: Langston Hughes
- You can tell the world (SSA)
- You can tell the world (TTBB)
- Fields of Wonder, song cycle, male chorus, Text: Langston Hughes (1963)
- Mass in D minor, chorus and organ, (only Kyrie is extant) (1959)
- This Little light of mine, spiritual, for soprano, chorus, and orchestra
- Touch the Hem of His Garment (Lovoos), for soprano, chorus, and piano
- Standin' in the need of prayer, spiritual, for soprano and chorus
- No man has seen his face, Chorus (1970)
- Praise the Lord für gemischten, Chor (1965)
- Simon bore the cross für gemischten choir, organ or piano
- I wish I knew how it would feel to be free, spiritual, for soprano, chorus, and orchestra
- Sinner, please don't let this harvest pass, spiritual, for soprano and mixed chorus
1. I'm gonna do a song and dance, Chor, Text: Bill Cairo
2. If you're not there for Choir, Text: Andy Razaf (1939)
- St. Francis' prayer for mixed choir
- Standing in the need of prayer for soprano and mixed choir (1970)
- Supplication for eight-part choir, Text: Roger Chaney
- The night shall be filled with music for mixed choir, Text: Henry Wadsworth Longfellow (1965

=== Pieces for stage ===
- Shakespeare in Harlem, music-theater work (1959), Text: Langston Hughes
- Romey and Julie, Text: R. Dunmore
- U.S.A., music-theater work, Text by John Dos Passos
- The Migration, ballet
- Wings over Broadway, ballet (1940)
- Midtown affair, musical, Text: Roger Chaney (1958)
- Burlesque is alive, musical
- Clandestine in the morning line, music for drama by Josh Greenfield, UA (1961)
- Tropics after dark, musical (1940)
- Winter night's dream, children's operetta, Text: Robert Dunsmore (1956)

=== Pieces for solo voice and piano ===
- Sleep Song (Kilmer) (1927 or before 3 March 1928), ed. John Michael Cooper in Margaret Bonds: Three Early Songs (Worcester, Massachusertts: Hildegard Publishing, 2025)
- We're All for Hoover Today (Majors) (1928) (self-published Chicago, 1928)
- Sunset (Dunbar) (ca. 1934), ed. John Michael Cooper in Margaret Bonds: Three Early Songs (Worcester, Massachusetts: Hildegard Publishing, 2025)
- Be a little savage with me, Text: Langston Hughes
- Chocolate Carmencita, Text: Langston Hughes
- Cowboy from South Parkway, Text: Langston Hughes
- Didn't it rain!, Spiritual
- Empty Interlude, Text: Roger Chaney and Andy Razaf
- Ezekiel saw de wheel
- Five Creek-Freedmen spirituals (1946)
1. "Dry Bones"
- Ev'ry Time I Feel the Spirit (1968), ed. John Michael Cooper and Louise Toppin in Margaret Bonds: Five Spiritual Songs (Ann Arbor: Videmus, 2024).
1. "Sit down servant"
2. "Lord, I just can't keep from crying"
3. "You can tell the world"
4. "I'll reach to heaven"
- Nebuchadnezzar (Rucker) (1940), ed. John Michael Cooper and Louise Toppin in Margaret Bonds: Five Spiritual Songs (Ann Arbor: Videmus, 2024)
- Georgia (1939), in collaboration with A. Razaf, and J. Davis
- Go tell it on the mountain for voice and piano
- Hand Me Down (probably before 1955), ed. John Michael Cooper and Louise Toppin in Margaret Bonds: Five Spiritual Songs (Ann Arbor: Videmus, 2024)
- He's got the whole world in His hands for high voice and piano (1963)
- Hold on
- I got a home in that rock
- I shall pass through the world
- I'll make you savvy
- Just a no good man, Text: Langston Hughes
- Let's make a dream come true
- Lonely little maiden by the sea, Text: Langston Hughes
- Market day in Martinique, Text: Langston Hughes
- Mary had a little baby
- The Negro speaks of rivers (1936), Text: Langston Hughes
- No good man
- Peachtree street
- Pretty flower of the tropics, Text: Langston Hughes and Arna Bontemps
- Rainbow gold, Text: Roger Cheney
- Sing aho, Spiritual
- Six Songs on Poems by Edna St. Vincent Millay
1. "Women Have Loved Before as I Love Now"
2. "Hyacinth"
3. "Even in the Moment"
4. "Feast"
5. "I Know My Mind"
6. "What Lips My Lips Have Kissed"
- Songs of the Seasons, Text: Langston Hughes
1. "Poem d'automne"
2. "Winter-moon"
3. "Young love in spring"
4. "Summer storm"
- Spring will be so sad when she comes this year (1940), in collaboration with H. Dickinson
- Sweet nothings in Spanish, Text: Langston Hughes and Arna Bontemps
- Three Sacred Songs
1. "No Man Has Seen His Face"
2. "Touch the Hem of His Garment"
3. "Faith in Thee"
- Tain't no need, Text: Roger Cheney
- Three dream portraits for voice and piano (1932)
- To a brown girl dead, Text: Countee Cullen
- The way we dance in Chicago/Harlem, Text: Langston Hughes
- When the dove enters in, Text: Langston Hughes (1960)
- When the sun goes down in rhumba land, Text: Langston Hughes and Arna Bontemps
- The Pasture (1959), Text: R. Frost
- Stopping by the Woods on a Snowy Evening (1963), Text: R. Frost
- I'm so in love, Text: Margaret Bonds and Leonard Reed (1927)
- Spring delight
- That sweet silent love, Text: Langston Hughes
- The singin' mouse, Text: Henry Douté (1937)
- Voo doo man, Text: Langston Hughes
- African dance for soprano baritone and piano (1953)
- April rain song for voice and piano
- Available Jones for voice and piano
- Be a little savage with me for voice and piano, Text: Langston Hughes (1949)
- Beyond the end of the trail for voice and piano, Text: Roger Chaney
- Birth for voice and piano, Text: Langston Hughes
- Bound for voice and piano, 1939
- Bright star ffor voice and piano, Text: Janice Lovoos (1968)
- Cowboy from South Parkway for voice and piano, Text: Langston Hughes
- 5 Creek-freedmen spirituals for voice and piano (1942)
- Diary of a divorcee for voice and piano, Text: Janice Lovoos (1968)
- Didn't it rain? for high voice and piano, 1967
- Don't speak for voice and piano, Text: Janice Lovoos (1968)
- Don't you want to be free?, Musical, Text: Langston Hughes (1938)
- Down South in Dixie for voice and piano (1933)
- Dry bones for voice and piano (1946)
- Empty interlude for voice and piano, Text: Roger Chaney and Andy Razaf (1941)
- Every time I feel the spirit for voice and piano (1970)
- Ezek'el saw the wheel for medium voice and piano (1959)
- Fantasy in purple for voice and piano (1937)
- Feast for voice and piano (1965)
- Fields of wonder for male voices, Text: Langston Hughes (1963)
- Footprints on my heart for voice and piano, Text: Marjorie May
- Freedom land for voice and piano, Text: Langston Hughes (1964)
- Georgia for voice and piano, Text: Andy Razaf, Margaret Bonds and Joe Davis (1939)
- Hold on for high voice and piano (1962)
- Hold the wind for voice and piano (1970)
- Hyacinth for voice and piano Text: Edna St. Vincent Millay
- I got a home in that rock for voice and piano (1959)
- I shall pass through the world for voice and piano (1966)
- I want to be ready for voice and piano
- I'll make you savvy for voice and piano, Text: Langston Hughes
- I'm going to Reno for voice and piano
- Joshua fit de battle of Jericho for medium voice and piano (1967)
- Joy for voice and piano, Text: Langston Hughes (1936)
- Lady by the moon I vow for voice and piano, Text: Robert Dunsmore (1939)
- Let's make a dream come true for voice and piano, Text: Roger Chaney
- Let's meet tonight in a dream for voice and piano, Text: Roger Chaney
- Little Davd, play on your harp for voice and piano, premiere 1956
- Lord, I just can't keep from cryin' for voice and piano (1946)
- Love ain't what it used to be for voice and piano (1935)
- Love's runnin' riot for voice and piano, Text: Langston Hughes (1946)
- My kind of man for voice and piano, Text: Roger Chaney (1953)
- Night time for voice and piano, Text: Langston Hughes (1937)
- No good man for voice and piano, Text: Langston Hughes (1937)
- Note on the commercial theater for voice and piano, Text: Langston Hughes (1960)
- Park bench for voice and piano, Text: Langston Hughes (1936)
- Peachtree Street for voice and piano, Text: Andy Razaf, Margaret Bonds and Joe Davis
- Peter, go ring dem bells for voice and piano or orchestra
- Playing with fire for voice and piano, Text: Langston Hughes
- Pot pourri for voice and piano (1968)
- Radio ballroom for voice and piano, Text: Andy Razaf (1957)
- Rainbow gold for voice and piano, Text: Roger Chaney(1956)
- Romey and Julie, music for Play by Robert Dunsmore
- Run, sinner, run for voice and piano (1970)
- Sea ghost for voice and piano (1932)
- Silent love; that sweet silent love for voice and piano, Text: Langston Hughes (1937)
- Sing aho for medium voice and piano (1960)
- Sinner, please don't let this harvest pass (1964), ed. John Michael Cooper and Louise Toppin in Margaret Bonds: Five Spiritual Songs (Ann Arbor: Videmus, 2024)
- Sleep song for voice and piano, Text: Joyce Kilmer (1932)
- Songs of the seasons for high voice and piano (1955)
- Stopping by the woods on a snowy evening for voice and piano, Text: Robert Frost ( 1960)
- Swing low, sweet chariot for voice and piano (1952)
- T'ain't no need for voice and piano, Text: Roger Chaney (1942)
- The blues I'm playing for voice and piano, Text: Langston Hughes (1941)
- The little sugar I had last night for voice and piano (1961)
- The migration, musical (1964)
- The moon winked twice for voice and piano, Texts: Margaret Bonds, Dan Burkley and Dorothy Sachs (1941)
- The Negro speaks of rivers; I've known rivers for medium voice and piano, Text: Langston Hughes (1935)
- The New York blues for voice and piano, Text: Malone Dickerson (1938)
- The pasture for voice and piano, Text: Robert Frost (1958)
- The price of a love affair for voice and piano, Text:Ernest Richman
- The way we dance in Chicago for voice and piano, Text: Langston Hughes
- This little light of mine for voice and piano (1970)
- Three sheep in a pasture for piano (1940)
- To a brown girl, voice and piano, Text: Countee Cullen (1933, 1956)
- Trampin' for voice and piano (1931)
- West Coast blues for voice and piano (1938)
- What lips my lips have kissed for voice and piano, Text: Edna St. Vincent Millay (1956)
- You're pretty special for voice and piano, Text: Dorothy Sachs (1941)

List includes works compiled in John Michael Cooper, Margaret Bonds, as well as in a monograph published by the Center for Black Music Research at Columbia College Chicago.
