= Mary Howe =

American composer and patron

Mary Howe (née Carlisle) (April 4, 1882 – September 14, 1964) was an American composer and pianist.

== Early life and education ==
Mary Wortham Carlisle was born on April 4, 1882, in Richmond, Virginia, at her maternal grandparents' home. Her father, Calderon Carlisle Esq., was a well-known and successful international lawyer as well as legal counsel for the Spanish, British, and Italian legations in Washington, D.C., directly descended from the Earls of Buchan, Macleod Chiefs of Scotland, and a colorful tapestry of European nobility. Her mother, Katherine Cornick Thomas, came from an old Richmond, Virginia family descended from the First Families of Virginia; her father, James B. Thomas Jr. being a prominent philanthropist. Carlisle was raised in Washington, D.C. and later lived in Newport, Rhode Island with her husband, Walter Bruce Howe Esq. (law partner of her brother, James Mandeville Carlisle Esq.), at their home, Berry Hill, on Ocean Drive, designed by Mckim, Mead, and White.

Her early lessons were with the noted pianist Herminie Seron. By age 18, Carlisle was performing publicly and was accepted into Baltimore's Peabody Institute. Before attending Peabody, she studied form and analysis with Howard Thatcher, a Peabody alumnus. At Peabody, she studied piano with Richard Burmeister, achieving notable proficiency. She also studied composition with Gustav Strube, Ernest Hutcheson, and Harold Randolph. At the age of 40, she returned to Peabody to study composition and graduated with an Artist Diploma in Composition in 1922. In 1933, Howe traveled to Paris to study with Nadia Boulanger, a renowned French pianist and composer. Paris also offered opportunities of cultural experiences and art education for her daughter Molly. Howe met Nadia at a concert and later over tea.

Howe was a frequent composer-in-residence at MacDowell and spent almost every summer between 1926 and 1952 in the Schelling studio (previously the Bark studio).

== Performing career ==
As early as 1911, Howe started performing with her friend Anne Hull, with one of their most notable performances being of Mozart's Concerto for Two Pianos. After giving birth to her three children, Howe toured internationally with Hull, giving performances with major orchestras such as the Baltimore Symphony, the Cleveland Orchestra, the Russian Symphony, and others.

Although it was not permitted for women of Howe's social standing to perform music in public, she was a frequent pianist in private salons, parties, and music clubs, including at the White House during both the Taft and Roosevelt administrations. Howe was also friendly with fellow composer Amy Beach, and the pair performed the Washington, D.C. premiere of Beach's Suite for Two Pianos in a benefit concert for MacDowell.

Howe and her three children also formed a singing group known as the 4 Howes, and performed madrigals and early music together.

== Composition career ==
Although Howe had developed a robust performing career, she much preferred composition. Her early compositions were almost exclusively for piano. At only nine years old, she composed The Mariposa Waltz for piano in 1891. She notably emulated Neo-romanticism, with an unusually open mind for modernism.

She began to develop an interest in themes in nature and American themes, paving the way for some of her most famous orchestral works (which include Sand, Stars, Rock, Three Pieces after Emily Dickinson and "Chain Gang Song" for orchestra and chorus). Her Chain Gang Song was especially praised for its lack of femininity; after its first performance, once the chorus and orchestra called her up to bow, a man from the audience praised the conductor for the piece and asked why a woman was bowing with the ensemble. Reflecting on this premiere at a later point in her life, Howe stated,

"The first time I heard a piece of my own orchestral writing played, I got a real kick out of it. I finally began to rate respectably as pianist and composer... This was the public rehearsal at Worcester, 1925, of my Chain Gang Song for chorus and orchestra, with about 275 voices and the New York Symphony [under Albert Stoessel], and there it was out of my hands and about to come to life."

Howe later developed a passion for composing for the voice, writing many art songs. In support of her country during World War II, she composed vigorous pieces in support of the troops which incorporated the texts of William Blake, also written for voice.

Howe was a highly prolific composer and wrote over 200 compositions during her lifetime.

== Philanthropic Work ==
In 1931, Mary Howe co-founded the National Symphony Orchestra at the request of its first director, conductor and cellist Hans Kindler. Kindler asked for Howe's help to raise $40,000 for a new orchestra based in Washington, D.C. Thanks to her connections and force of personality, she was able to raise the funds.

Howe also later co-founded the Chamber Music Society of Washington in tandem with philantrhopist Elizabeth Sprague Coolidge as well as the Society of American Women Composers. Howe's involvement spread across numerous groups such as the National Federation of Music Clubs, the League of Composers, the National Association of American Composers and Conductors, the MacDowell Colony, the Huntington Hartford Foundation, and on the board of the National Cultural Center (the Kennedy Center for the Performing Arts). Howe was also a member of the League of American Pen Women alongside other composers such as Amy Beach, Gena Branscombe, and Phyllis Fergus.

Howe died in 1964 at the age of 82, ten years after the death of her husband, Walter Bruce Howe. They were survived by their three children, Bruce, Calderon, and Molly.

== Works ==
All pieces published unless otherwise noted.

=== Choral works ===
- Catalina (1924)
- Chain Gang Song (1925)
- Cavaliers (1927, unpublished)
- Laud for Christmas (1936)
- Robin Hood's Heart (1936, unpublished)
- Spring Pastoral (1936)
- Christmas Song (1939)
- Song of Palms (1939)
- Song of Ruth (1939)
- Williamsburg Sunday (1940)
- Prophecy (1943)
- A Devotion (1944)
- Great Land of Mine (1953)
- Poem in Praise (1955, unpublished)
- The Pavilion of the Lord (1957, unpublished)
- Benedictus es Domine (1960, unpublished)
- We Praise thee O God (1962, unpublished)

=== Songs ===
- Old English Lullaby (1913)
- Somewhere in France (1918)
- Cossack Cradle Song (1922)
- Berceuse (1925)
- Chanson Souvenir (1925)
- O Mistress Mine (1925)
- The Prinkin' Leddie (1925)
- Reach (1925)
- Red Fields of France (1925)
- Ma douleur (1929)
- Ripe Apples (1929)
- There has Fallen a Splendid Tear (1930)
- Der Einsame (1931)
- Liebeslied (1931)
- Mailied (1931)
- Schlafied (1931)
- Abendlied (1932, unpublished)
- Avalon (1932)
- The Little Rose (1932)
- The Rag Picker (1932)
- The Lake Isle of Innisfree (1933)
- Fair Annet's Song (1934)
- Herbsttag (1934)
- Little Elegy (1934)
- Fragment (1935)
- Now goes the light (1935)
- Velvet Shoes (1935)
- Go down Death (1936)
- A Strange Story (1936)
- Départ (1938, unpublished)
- Soit (1938)
- Viennese Waltz (1938)
- Irish Lullaby (1939, unpublished)
- You (1939)
- Am Flusse (1940)
- Die Götter (1940)
- Heute geh' ich (1940)
- Die Jahre (1940)
- Ich denke dein (1940)
- Trocknet nicht (1940, unpublished)
- Zweiful (1940)
- The Bird's Nest (1941)
- General Store (1941)
- Horses of Magic (1941)
- Song at Dusk (1941)
- Traveling (1941, unpublished)
- Were I to Die (1941, unpublished)
- L'amant des roses (1942)
- Mein Herz (1942)
- Men (1942)
- Nicht mit Engeln (1942)
- Hymne (1943)
- In Tauris (1944)
- Look on this horizon (1944, unpublished)
- To the Unknown Soldier (1944)
- Lullaby for a Forester's Child (1945)
- Rêve (1945)
- O Proserpina (1946)
- Spring Come not too Soon (1947)
- The Christmas Story (1948)
- The Bailey and the Bell (1950)
- Einfaches Lied (1955, unpublished)
- My Lady Comes (1957)
- Three Hokku (1958)

=== Orchestral works ===
- Poema (1922)
- Stars (1927; New York, 1963)
- Sand (1928; New York, 1963)
- Castellana, 2 pianos, orchestra (1930)
- Dirge (1931)
- Axiom (1932)
- American Piece (1933)
- Coulennes (1936)
- Potomac River (1940)
- Paean (1941)
- Agreeable Overture (1948)
- Rock (1954; New York, 1963)
- The Holy Baby of the Madonna (1958)

=== Chamber music ===
- Fugue, string quartet (1922)
- Violin Sonata, D (1922; New York, 1962)
- Ballade Fantasque (1927)
- 3 Restaurant Pieces (1927)
- Little Suite, string quartet (1928)
- Piano Quartet (1928)
- Suite mélancholique (1931)
- Patria (1932)
- Quatuor, string quartet (1939)
- 3 Pieces After Emily Dickinson, string quartet (1941)
- Interlude between 2 Pieces, flute, piano (1942)
- Wind Quintet (1957)

=== Piano music ===
- Andante douloureux (1910)
- Nocturne (1913; New York, 1925)
- Prelude (1920)
- Valse dansante, 2 pianos (1922, unpublished)
- Berceuse (1924; New York, 1925)
- Estudia brillante (1925, unpublished)
- 3 Spanish Folk Tunes, 2 pianos (1925; New York, 1926)
- Whimsy (1931)
- Stars (1934)
- Trifle (1933, unpublished)
- Cards, ballet for 2 pianos (1936, unpublished)
- Le jongleur de Notre Dame, ballet for 2 pianos (1959, unpublished)

=== Organ music ===
- Elegy (1939)
- For a Wedding (1940, unpublished)

Also transcriptions of works by J. S. Bach for 1 and 2 pianos.

== Discography ==
- Music by Mary Howe (1998) – performed by John Martin, Mary Howe, William Strickland, and Catholic University of America Chamber Arts Society, Performed by Tokyo Imperial Philharmonic Orchestra and Vienna Philharmonic
- Love's Seasons: Songs of Mary Howe and Robert Ward (2004) by Sandra McClain and Margo Garrett
- Stars (1927) – Hans Kindler and the National Symphony Orchestra of Washington, D.C., on 29 January 1941 for RCA Victor (78 rpm: 11-8608) and reissued on CD in 1999 (Biddulph WHL 063).
- Songs and Duets (2021) – Courtney Maina (soprano), Christopher Leach (tenor), Mary Dibbern (piano), Toccata Classics TOCC0634
- Between Us: Music for Two by Mary Howe (2022) – includes the Violin Sonata (1922), and Ballade Fantastique, Three Restaurant Pieces, Partita, Merles de Coulenne, Interlude between Two Pieces, various performers, Navona NV6432

== Sources ==
- Goss, Madeleine (1952). Modern Music-Makers: Contemporary American Composers. New York: E. P. Dutton & Co.
- Indenbaum, Dorothy (1993). Mary Howe: Composer, Pianist and Music Activist (PhD thesis). New York University. ProQuest 304073289.
- Indenbuam, Dorothy; Oja, Carol J. (20 January 2001). "Howe, Mary". Grove Music Online. doi:10.1093/gmo/9781561592630.article.49205.
- McClain, Sandra Clemmons (4 May 1992). The Solo Vocal Repertoire of Mary Carlisle Howe with Stylistic and Interpretive Analyses of Selected Works (EdD thesis). Columbia University. ProQuest 303975612.
