= Mary Salter =

Mary Salter may refer to:

- Mary Jo Salter (born 1954), American poet
- Mary Elizabeth Turner Salter (1856–1938), American soprano and composer
