= Phyllis Fergus =

American Composer and Reciter

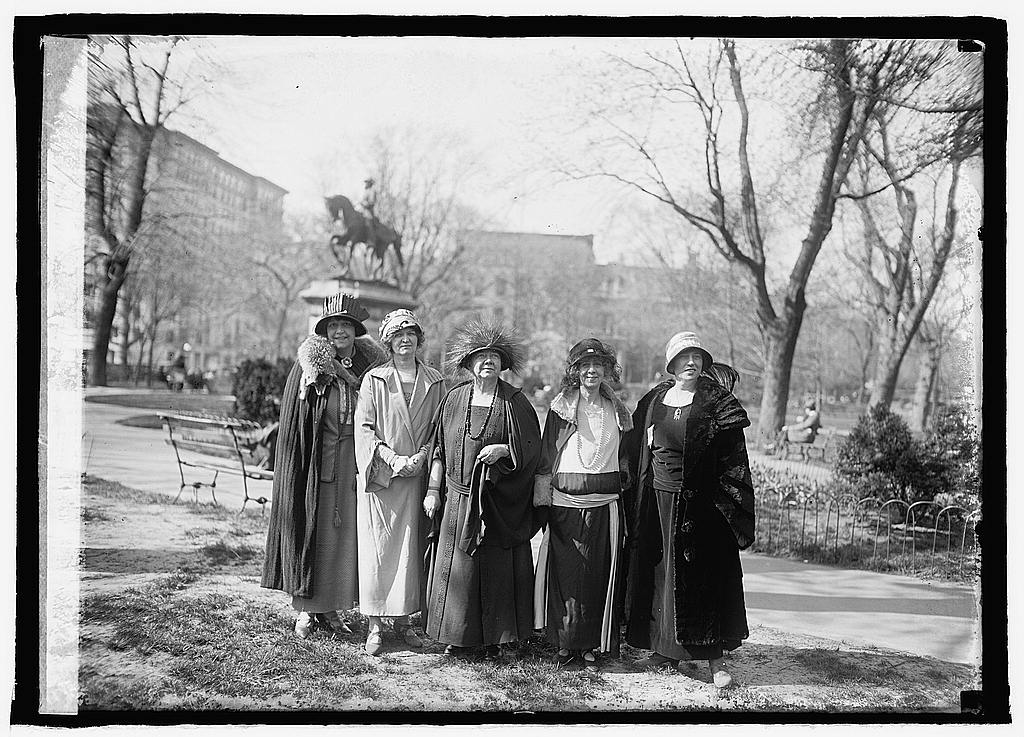
- Phyllis Fergus, Ethel Glenn Hier, Amy Beach, Harriet Ware and Gena Branscombe in 1924
- Born: October 2, 1887; Chicago
- Died: December 2, 1964 (aged 77)
- Spouse: Thatcher Hoyt

Phyllis Fergus Hoyt (October 2, 1887 – December 2, 1964) was a composer, reciter, pianist, and advocate for music by women composers.

== Life ==
Phyllis Fergus was born in Chicago, where she attended a variety of cultural events, including musical concerts. Beginning in her twenties, she attended Smith College, where she studied composition with Henry Dike Sleeper and was a member of student composer group known as the Clef Club. She also earned a Masters of Arts in composition from the American Conservatory in Chicago in 1918, where she studied with Adolf Weidig.

== National League of American Pen Women ==
Fergus served as the president of the National League of American Pen Women from 1936 to 1938, and was the first musician to hold the position.

Her first major event with the League was in 1933 in Chicago, which featured conductor Ebba Sundstrom and the Women's Symphony playing music from 13 women composers including Gena Branscombe and Mary Carr Moore. In 1934, Fergus organized a "Golden Jubilee" concerto to honor Amy Beach's 50 years of composing. The festival included ten events over six days, culminating in a concert held in the East Room of the White House.

Fergus, president of the Illinoiss Federation of Music Clubs Narcissa Elizabeth Yager, and composer Radie Britain organized another concert at the Chicago World's Fair which took place on October 13, 1934 as a tribute to "Mrs. H.H.A. Beach, Dean of American Women Composers." The event included a performance by renowned concert pianist and composer Theodora Sturkow-Ryder, and was hosted at the Illinois Host House.

== Selected works list and compositional style ==
Fergus specialized in a type of composition known as "story poems", a work written for spoken word performed with piano accompaniment, although she also wrote works for orchestra, operettas, songs, chamber music, and choral works. Her story poems were often humorous in nature, and featured topics like families, marriage, and courtship.

=== Orchestral Works ===
- The Highwayman: A Dramatic Reading for Speaking Voice and Orchestra

=== Story Poems ===
- "The Usual Way" (1942)
- "My Mother's Ma: A Modern Grandmother" (1918)
- "Apples" (1921)
- "When I ain't got you" (1916)
- "Why?" (1916)
- "Soap: The Oppressor" (1915)
