= Mary Elizabeth Turner Salter =

American soprano and composer

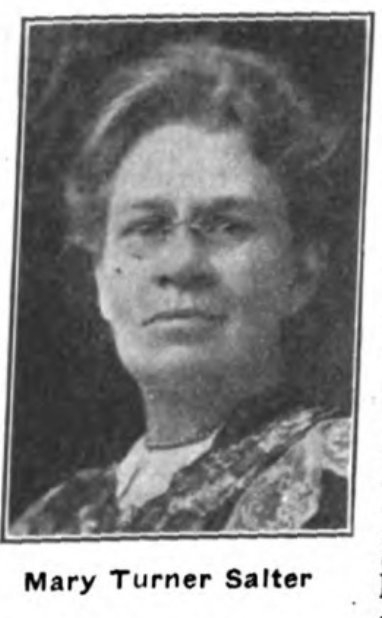
- ca. 1919
- Born: March 15, 1856; Peoria, Illinois
- Died: September 12, 1938 (aged 82); Orangeburg, New York

Mary Elizabeth Turner Salter (15 March 1856 – 12 September 1938) was an American soprano and composer.

== Life ==
=== Early life and education ===
Mary Elizabeth Turner was born in Peoria, Illinois, the daughter of Jonathan and Mary E. Hinds Turner, who had just moved to the midwest from Maine. After her birth, the Turners moved to Oquwakwa. Turner learned music from both of her parents, who were musically inclined, but it was her mother who gave her initial piano lessons. Turner graduated from Burlington High School in Burlington, Iowa and took voice lessons with Alfred Arthur. She gave her first public performance in 1870 when she was fourteen years old by singing the "Inflammatus" from Giachino Rossini's Stabat Mater in Burlington. Turner then moved to New York City, where she began lessons with Gustav Schilling before moving once again, this time to Boston. She enrolled at the New England Conservatory to study voice with John O'Neill and Lillian Nordica. She also studied with compsoer Hermine Küchenmeister-Rudersdorf.

=== Career ===
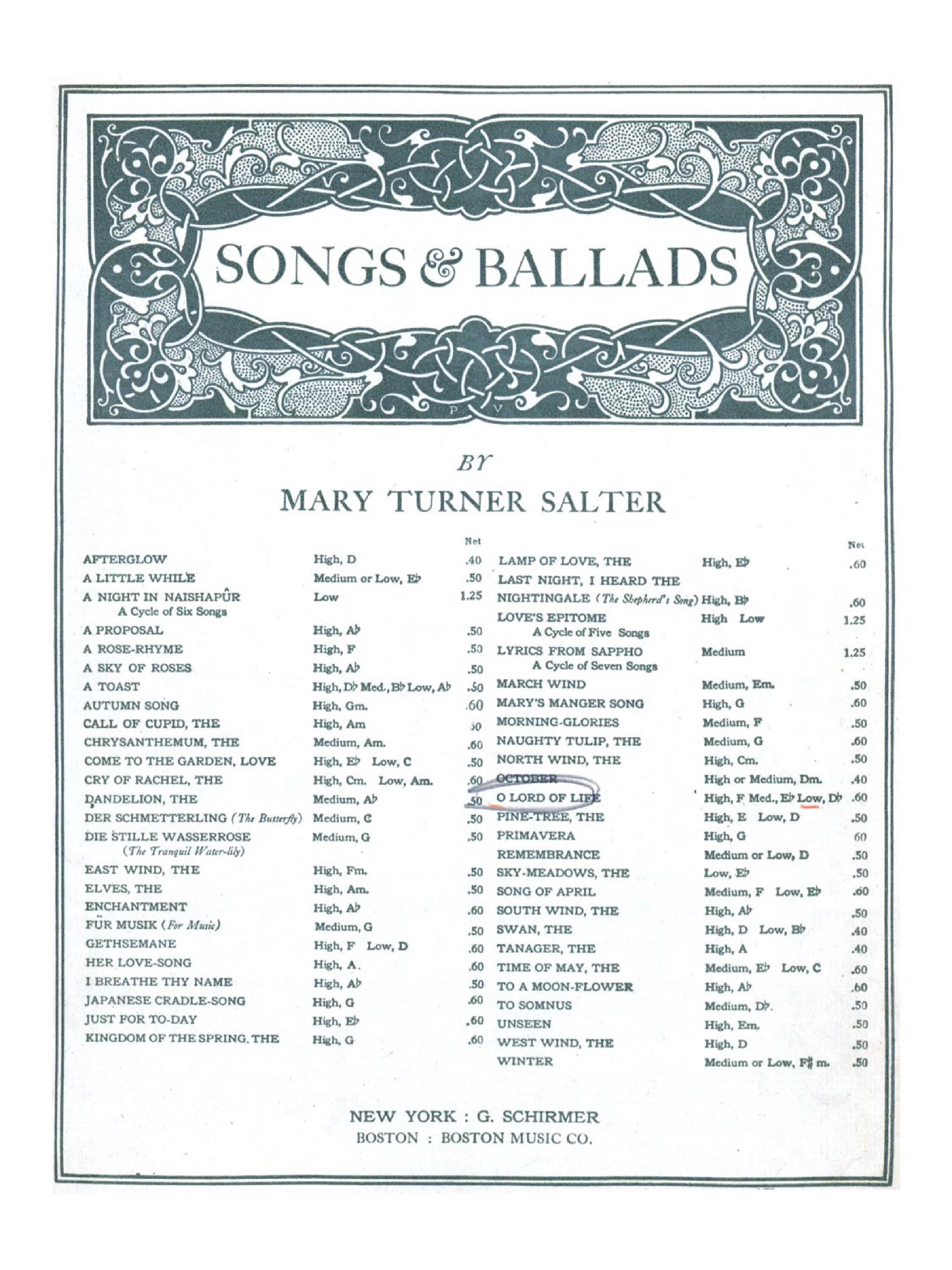
List of Songs and Ballads by Mary Turner Salter, 1906

Turner worked as a voice teacher at Wellesley College and performed in churches in Boston. In 1881, she married Sumner Salter. She was one of the founding members of the American Society of Women Composers. Turner Salter was also a member of the League of American Pen Women alongside such composers as Amy Beach, Gena Branscombe, and Phyllis Fergus.

== Reception and legacy ==
A 1907 review of tenor John Braun's recital in The New York Times described three of her songs as showing "cleverness and brilliancy." A 1930 issue of The Musical Courier noted that Turner Salter was "frequently called one of the foremost song composers of America." Her music was described by D.A. Clippinger, singer and author from Chicago, as being of the highest quality, stating,

I often wondered what manner of person it was that had this peculiar gift for vocal writing, who could write songs without dreary spots in them, with no padding, with no evidence that inspiration had run low and mere intellect was at work; songs that had unity and a due sense of proportion, that were a combination of a lovely poem and a fine melody, with just enough accompaniment but never overloaded. One day I discovered the secret—the writer of these songs was a singer.

Turner Salter died in Orangeburg, New York in 1938.

== Works ==
Turner wrote about 130 songs. Selected works include:

- The Cry of Rachel
- Song of April
- A Der Schmetterling (from Three German Songs) (Text: Heinrich Heine)
- Love's Epitome (a cycle of five songs)
- Foreign Lands (text: Robert Louis Stevenson)
- Life (from Five Songs) (Text: Paul Laurence Dunbar)
- The High Song (text: Humbert Wolfe)
- Wandrers Nachtlied (text: Johann Wolfgang von Goethe)
