= Welge =

Welge is a surname of German origin. Notable people with the surname include:

- Andree Welge (born 1972), German darts player
- Gladys Welge (1902–1976), American violinist and conductor
