= William J. McCoy (composer) =

American composer

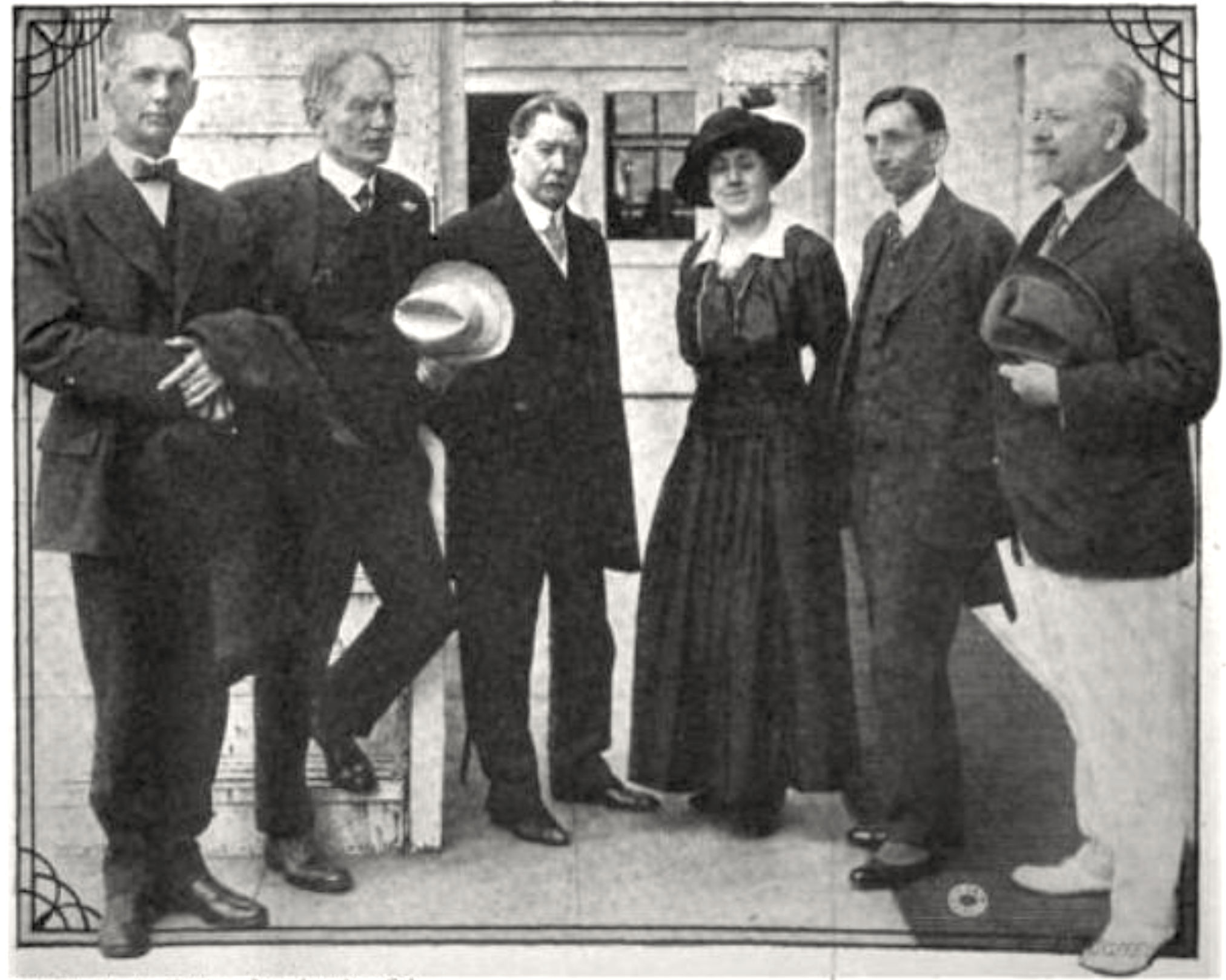
From left to right are composers Arne Oldberg, William J. McCoy, George W. Chadwick, Mabel Daniels, Charles Wakefield Cadman, and Carl Busch at the 1915 American Music Congress.

William J. McCoy (March 15, 1848 – 1926) was an American composer, music theorist, and music educator. Primarily active as composer and teacher of music in California, he was trained as a musician in New York City and at the Leipzig Conservatory (now the University of Music and Theatre Leipzig). He was for many years the head of the composition and harmony departments at Mills College.

== Life and career ==
Born in Crestline, Ohio, McCoy grew up in California where he moved with his family at a young age. He started composing music at the age of 12, and later began his formal training as a composer with William Mason in New York City. He pursued further studies at the Leipzig Conservatory where he was a pupil of Carl Reinecke and Moritz Hauptmann. Reinecke conducted the premiere of his Symphony in F in Leipzig in 1872.

In addition to his symphony, McCoy wrote chamber music, some pieces for orchestra, an opera, incidental music for plays, and choral works including a mass in D minor. His opera Egyppt was given its premiere at the Berkley Music Festival in 1921; a work which was awarded the Bispham Medal by the American Opera Society of Chicago. He was active for a time in San Francisco, California and contributed music to events of the Bohemian Club. He was head of the composition and harmony departments at Mills College in Oakland, California; resigning from that post in 1925. He was the author of the music theory textbook Cumulative Harmony.

McCoy died in Oakland, California on October 15, 1926.
