= Mabel Daniels =

American classical composer

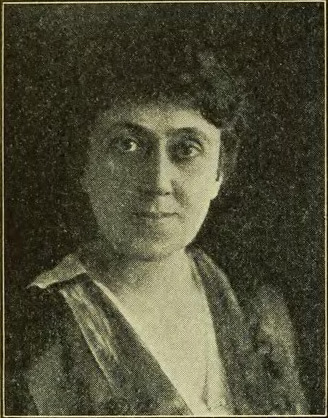
- Born: November 27, 1877; Swampscott
- Died: March 10, 1971; Cambridge, Boston
- Occupation: Composer

Mabel Daniels, also known as Mabel Wheeler Daniels, (November 27, 1877 in Swampscott, Massachusetts – March 10, 1971 in Boston) was an American composer, conductor, and teacher. She attended Radcliffe College and studied with George Whitefield Chadwick before traveling to Germany for further study with Ludwig Thuille in Munich. Upon her return to the United States she became head of the music department at Simmons College, serving there until 1918. She continued working until late in her life, and was given honorary degrees by both Boston University and Tufts University. Much of her output was choral, though she wrote a handful of operettas and some orchestral and chamber works.

== Biography ==
=== Background and early life ===
On November 27, 1877, Mabel Wheeler Daniels was born in Swampscott, Massachusetts. Music took early influence in Daniels' career. She was born in a musically prominent family, both her parents sang in Boston's Handel and Haydn Society.

In her early years, Daniels studied the piano and by age 10 she began writing her own compositions, including her first piece for piano, Fairy Charm Waltz. She attended Radcliffe College where she sang soprano. There she participated in the glee club as well as performing lead for numerous operettas. Along with her performance credentials, Daniels continued her composition writing and conducting two student operettas. In 1900, Daniels graduated from Radcliffe magna cum laude. Daniels studied with George Chadwick at the New England Conservatory of Music, there Chadwick encouraged Daniels to enroll in the Munich Conservatory to study under one of his old students, Ludwig Thuille. Travelling to Munich, Daniels boldly insisted on auditioning for Bernhard Stavenhagen’s score-reading class. Up until that point no woman had successfully gained admittance to the class. Daniels recalls her experience auditioning for this position in front of a class of 30 males:

"You could have heard a pin drop, the place was so still. . . . Just as I took my seat before the keyboard, I heard one of the men smother a laugh. That settled it! I was bound to do or die, and with a calmness quite unnatural I played the bars set before me without a mistake. Nobody laughed when I had finished."

=== Career and later life ===
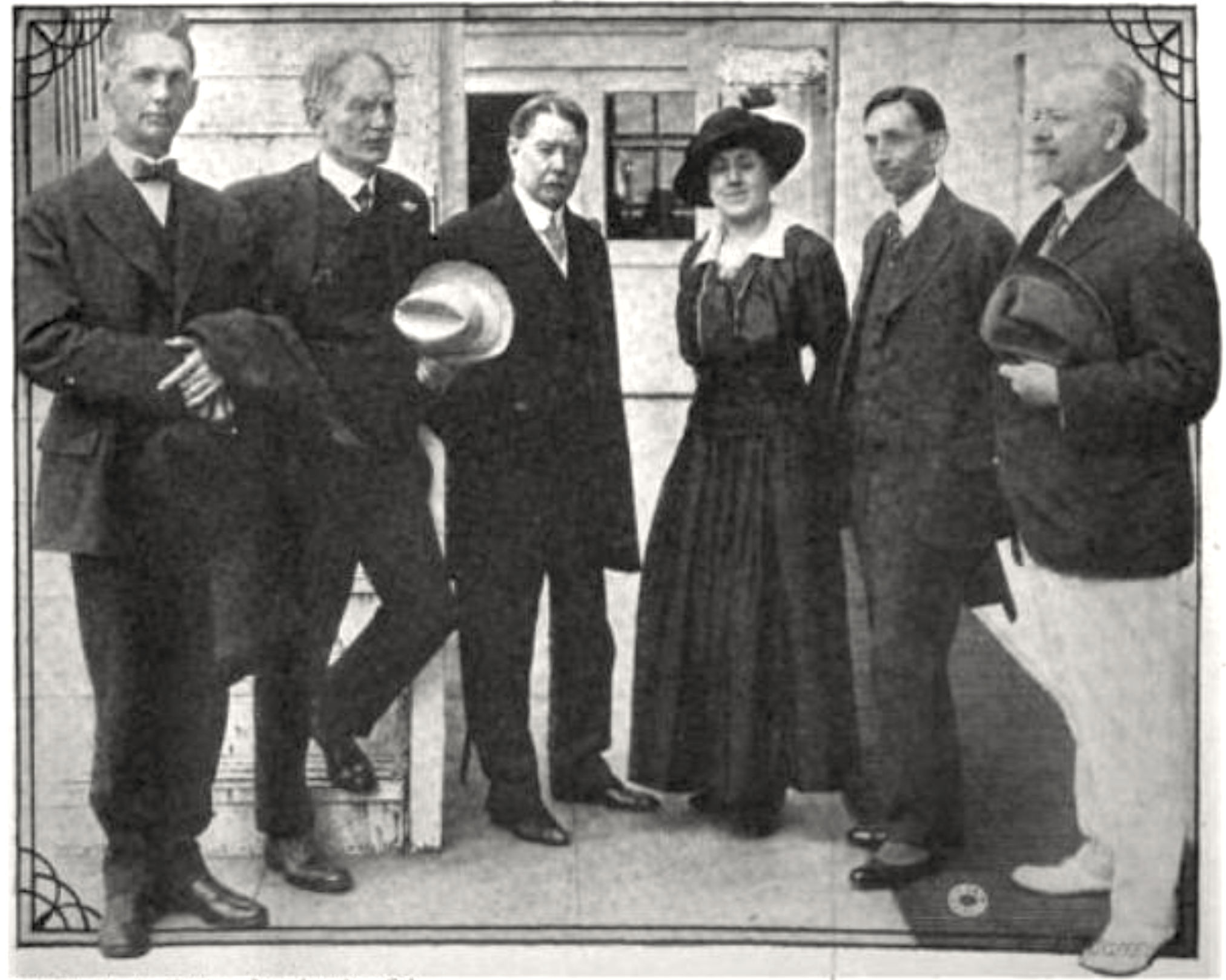
From left to right are composers Arne Oldberg, William J. McCoy, George W. Chadwick, Mabel Daniels, Charles Wakefield Cadman, and Carl Busch at the 1915 American Music Congress.

Returning to America, Daniels was exposed to modern choral works with orchestra. She started working as the director of Radcliffe's Glee Club and the Bradford Academy music program (1911-1913). Daniels was appointed head of the music program at Simmons from 1913-1918. Along with her career successes, Daniels established different prizes and funds for composition students studying at Radcliffe College. In 1933, Daniels was awarded an honorary degree from Tufts University, and then later, in 1939, she was given the same honors by Boston University.

== Works ==
=== Notable compositions ===
In 1913, Daniels presented her choral/orchestral work “The Desolate City, op.21.” Performed at the MacDowell Colony in New Hampshire, Daniels gained considerable praise. For 24 summers, Daniels would return to the MacDowell Colony and eventually be inspired to write one of her best known pieces, “Deep Forest, op.34, no. 1” from 1923-33. “Deep Forest” would later be performed in Carnegie Hall (1939). The piece is well known for exemplifying her shift from Germanic compositional techniques to a “more impressionistic musical vocabulary.” Two additional pieces were written specifically for Radcliffe's 50th anniversary and 75th anniversary, “Exultate Deo” and “A Psalm of Praise” respectively.
