= Herbert Trench =

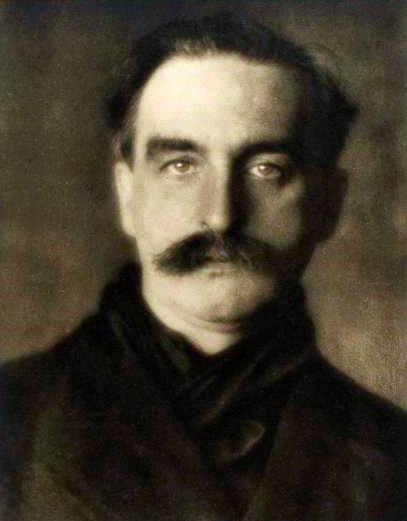
Trench in 1910

Frederic Herbert Trench (12 November 1865 – 11 June 1923) was an Irish poet.

== Life ==
Trench was born in Avonmore, County Cork, and educated at Haileybury and Keble College, Oxford. From 1891 he worked as an examiner for the Board of Education.

In 1908 a Dramatic Symphony, opus 51, written by Joseph Holbrooke setting Trench's poem Apollo and the Seaman was performed, under Thomas Beecham. Trench then moved into theatrical work for a few years, collaborating with his friend Thomas Evelyn Scott-Ellis, 8th Baron Howard de Walden. They put on The Blue Bird by Maeterlinck in 1909, and Ibsen's The Pretenders in 1913, at the Theatre Royal, Haymarket. Afterwards, he spent time travelling. He died in Boulogne-sur-Mer.

Some of his other poems were set to music by Arnold Bax and Mildred Lund Tyson.

== Works ==
- Deirdre Wed and other Poems (1901)
- New Poems (1907)
- Lyrics and Narrative Poems (1911?)
- Ode from Italy in time of War (1915)
- Napoleon (1919) play
- Poems (1924, Cape)

=== Translations ===
- "The Death of the Gods. Julian the Apostate" (1901) (Wikimedia scans) from Russian novelist Dmitry Merezhkovsky
- "The Romance of Leonardo da Vinci" (1904) (Wikimedia scans) from Russian novelist Dmitry Merezhkovsky
