= Ludwig Thuille =

Austrian composer and teacher

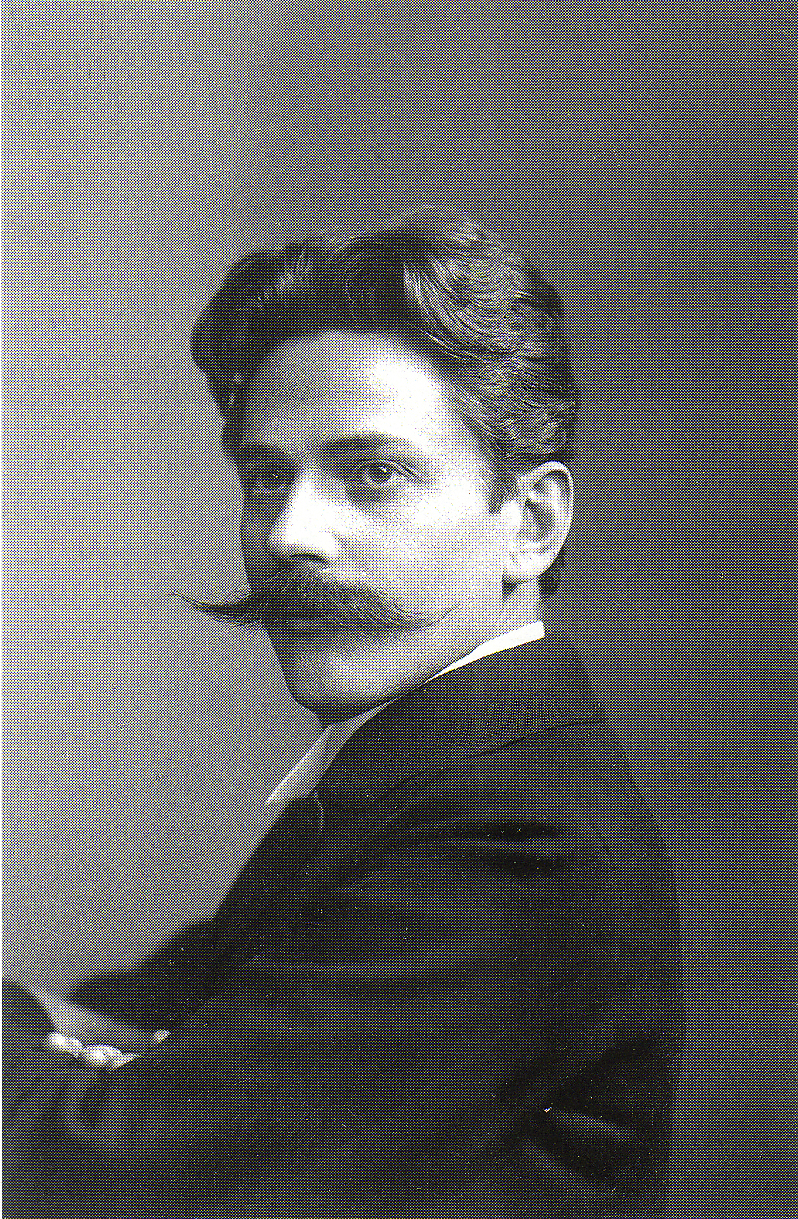
Ludwig Thuille.

Ludwig Wilhelm Andreas Maria Thuille /ˈtui̯lə/ (30 November 1861 – 5 February 1907) was an Austrian composer and teacher, numbered for a while among the leading operatic composers of the so-called Munich School of composers, whose most famous representative was Richard Strauss.

== Biography ==
Thuille was born in Bozen, then part of Tyrol, now in Italy. He lost both his parents in 1872 when he was 11, and moved in with his step-uncle in Kremsmünster, Austria. There, he sang in the Benedictine choir and studied organ, piano, and violin. His musical abilities were exceptional, so in 1876 the widow of a composer/ conductor, Matthaus Nagiller, took him to Innsbruck for more advanced musical training. There, in the summer of 1877, he met the young Richard Strauss, whose family was visiting the town; the two became lifelong friends.

His Innsbruck teacher of organ and theory recommended him to the distinguished composer Josef Rheinberger in Munich, who took him as a pupil in the Hochschule für Musik und Theater München, from where he graduated with honors in 1882. A year later, he became a teacher, and few years thereafter a professor of theory and composition. His many pupils included Hermann Abendroth, Ernest Bloch, Ernst Boehe, Richard Wetz, Paul von Klenau, Lily Reiff, Rudi Stephan, Walter Braunfels, Mabel Wheeler Daniels, Henry Kimball Hadley and Walter R. Spalding, who became the head of the Division of Music at Harvard University, and later taught Leroy Anderson.

A prolific composer, Thuille concentrated on chamber music - he is remembered principally for his Sextet for piano and wind instruments (1886–88), the only one of his works to have kept a toehold on the repertoire - and opera, though his early works include a Piano Concerto and a Symphony. In 1897 his opera Theuerdank gained the first prize and a prestigious staged premiere in an operatic competition sponsored by the Regent of Bavaria, in which Alexander von Zemlinsky was placed second. His second opera Lobetanz was premiered the following year in Karlsruhe and was a considerable, if short-lived, success. He also composed a Symphony in F major, much praised by Strauss, five other chamber works, 13 choral pieces, and 78 songs.

Despite his friendship with Strauss (which extended to making a 2-piano arrangement of the latter's tone poem Don Juan, dedicated to him), and despite his devotion to music-drama, Thuille remained a fairly conservative composer during his brief life. He died at the age of 45 in 1907 in Munich of heart failure. He was married for twenty years to Emma (née Dietl) until his death. They had two children.

Though neglected as a composer, Thuille's posthumously published Harmonielehre (written in collaboration with Rudolf Louis) went through many editions and was highly influential. Widely employed as part of the conservatory curriculum in German speaking countries through the 1960s, the Harmonielehre in two volumes is an important theoretical formulation devoted innovatively to the practices of the Munich School of composers, and remains one of few existing records providing examples of this music.

While Thuille's Sextet has always retained a certain following, several of his other compositions have become commercially available on CD only in recent years — his two Piano Quintets, the Piano Trio in E♭, the Piano Concerto in D and the Symphony in F among them.

== List of selected works ==
Operas

- Theuerdank
- Lobetanz, Op. 10

Orchestral works

- Romantic Overture, Op. 16 (Prelude to Act I of Theuerdank)
- Symphonicher Festmarsch, Op. 38
- Symphony in F
- Piano Concerto in D

Keyboard

- Organ sonata in A minor, Op. 2
- 3 Piano Pieces, Op. 3
- 3 Piano Pieces, Op. 33
- 3 Piano Pieces, Op. 34
- 2 Piano Pieces, Op. 37

Chamber

- Violin Sonata in D minor, No. 1, Op. 1
- Sextet for Piano and Wind Quintet in B♭ major, Op. 6
- Piano Quintet in E♭ major, No. 2, Op. 20
- Cello Sonata, Op. 22
- Violin Sonata in E minor, No. 2, Op. 30
- Allegro Giusto, Op. 39, for Violin and Piano
- Piano Trio in E♭ major
- Piano Quintet in G minor
- String Quartet in A major, No. 1
- String Quartet in G major, No. 2, WoO
- Quartett-Satz for String Quartet in A major

Vocal

78 solo songs, including:

- 5 Lieder, Op. 4
- 3 Lieder for female voice, Op. 5
- Song-cycle, Von Lieb' und Leid, Op. 7
- 3 Lieder, Op. 12
- 3 Lieder, Op. 15
- 3 Lieder, Op. 26
- 4 Lieder, Op. 27
- Urschlamm-Idyll, song for bass voice and piano (1908)

13 choral pieces, including:

- Weihnacht im Walde, Op. 14 for men's chorus
- Traumsommernacht, Op. 25, for women's chorus with harp and violin
- Rosenlied, Op. 29, for three-part women's chorus with piano
