= Theodora Troendle =

American composer, pianist, and music educator

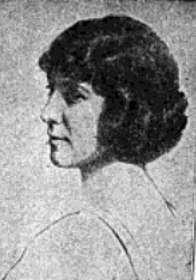
- Born: October 19, 1893; Chicago, Illinois, U.S.
- Died: June 12, 1972 (aged 78)
- Occupation(s): Composer, pianist, music educator

Theodora R. Troendle (October 19, 1893 – June 12, 1972) was an American composer, pianist, and music educator who composed a piano concerto, then premiered it as the soloist with the Chicago Women's Symphony Orchestra in 1927.

== Early life and education ==
Troendle was born in Chicago to Victor Hugo and Isabel MacDonald Troendle. She was raised in Minneapolis, where Victor was president of the Troendle Wholesale Paper Company.

Troendle studied with Adolf Weidig and Arne Oldberg at Northwestern University, and with pianist Fannie Bloomfield-Zeisler, working as her assistant from 1913 to 1920.

== Career ==
Troendle taught in Chicago at the MacDowell School of Music, the Sherwood Music School founded by William Hall Sherwood, and at DePaul University School of Music. She served a term as president of the Society of American Musicians.

An excellent pianist, Troendle did a trial recording for the Victor Talking Machine Company in 1922 which was never commercially released. She played for Recordo piano roll 67220 and Story & Clark piano roll 72827. She gave recitals and toured as a pianist, appearing as a soloist with the St. Louis, Minneapolis, Indianapolis, Milwaukee, and Chicago Women's Symphony orchestras.

Troendle's music was published by Clayton F. Summy Co.

== Publications ==
- "How Fannie Bloomfield-Zeisler Taught" (The Etude, November 1929)

== Compositions ==
- Piano Concerto
- Poem (violin and orchestra)
- Pomponette
- Suite Juvenile
