= Woman's Symphony Orchestra of Chicago =

American orchestra founded in 1925

The Woman's Symphony Orchestra of Chicago was an American orchestra based in Chicago. In addition to its regular radio broadcasts which spanned 1925–1948 (or 1952), the Woman's Symphony Orchestra of Chicago also toured.

== History ==
The orchestra was founded in 1925 by flutist Adeline Schmidt, cellist Lois Bichl, and clarinetist Lillian Poenisch. Like most industries of the era, women were barred from participating in most professional orchestras throughout the mid-20th century. Nonetheless, in 1924, a year before the Woman's Symphony Orchestra of this article was founded, another one with nearly the same name was founded by Elena Moneak, (Note: Elena Moneak was one of a small body of artists – the others included Lucie Bigelow Rosen and Clara Rockmore – who promoted the playing of the theremin. Elena married twice, first on March 14, 1917, in Chicago to Henry Howind (né Heinrich Friedrich Ernst Howind), with whom she had two daughters. Her second marriage was on April 30, 1939, to Frankie Snite (né Frank Joseph Snite).) which lasted until 1928. (see Disambiguation section, below)

Schmidt, Bichl, and Poenisch felt that Moneak's orchestra lacked professionalism from vocational, performance quality, and business management perspectives and aspired to create one. Initially, their overarching organizational objective was to offer professional performing experiences for women artists, which soon included women composers and conductors. The orchestra premiered notable works of women composers and showcased the artistry of several acclaimed women conductors. Among other things, the orchestra launched a scholarship program aimed at developing more opportunities for female professional orchestral brass and woodwind musicians.

=== Demise of the orchestra ===
There is some debate about the end of the orchestra. Some music historians have dated the orchestra's termination to its bankruptcy in 1948. However a photo of the orchestra exists dated 1952. The bankruptcy of the Woman's Symphony Orchestra of Chicago is generally known to have been the result of systemic changes following World War II rather than a simple lack of demand for all-female orchestras. As men in the U.S. were drafted in great numbers, often not returning, this resulted in a great demand in previously all-male professional orchestras to recruit female musicians from all female orchestras.

== Timeline ==
- 1925: Organized under charter by the Illinois Secretary of State as the "Woman's Symphony Orchestral Association"
- October 1925: First rehearsals began
- May 9, 1926: Inaugural concert in the Goodman Theater

== Selected personnel ==
=== Founding musicians ===
- Lillian Poenisch (née Lillian Juanita Poenisch), clarinetist, also founded the Chicago Women's Concert Band
- Adeline Schmidt (née Adeline Elizabeth Moore), flutist, who, on December 27, 1910, in Milwaukee, married Christian Carl Martin Schmidt.
- Lois Bichl (née Lois Colburn), cellist, who had studied in New York City with (i) Carl A. Brüchkner, a cellist with the Chicago Symphony for 41 years, and (ii) Bruno Steindel and in Chicago with (iii) Alfred Wallenstein. She was married twice, both to musicians, first, on March 11, 1920, to Frederick Thomas Langan, xylophonist and second, on August 21, 1925, to Edgar Anthony Bichl. Lois Bichl, under the name Lois Colburn, was a cellist with the Houston and San Antonio Symphonies, and also was an influential music educator.
- Winifred Townsend, violinist
- Stella P. Roberts, violist

=== Other musicians ===
- Helen Kotas, horn; while still a University of Chicago student, she was principal horn in the Woman's Symphony Orchestra, and in 1941 became the first woman to hold a rostered position in the Chicago Symphony Orchestra.

=== Founding non-musicians (patrons) ===
- Kathryn Funk (née Kathryn Frances Meeker). Since 1895, she had been married to Clarence Sydney Funk. She was a vocalist. Kathryn had a degree from the Chicago Musical College.

=== Conductors ===
1924–1927: Richard Czerwonky (né Richard Rudolph Czerwonky)
1927–1929: Ethel Leginska
1929–1939: Ebba Sundstrom Nylander (née Ebba Irene Violet Sundstrom;m), violinist, who, in 1920, married Victor Theodore Nylander
1938–1940: Gladys Welge (née Gladys Louise Welge) Welge, a violinist, founded, in 1931, the Symphony of Oak Park & River Forest. Welge was the Woman's Symphony's last woman conductor. Welge was assistant conductor of the orchestra for nine years and conductor for two.
1940–1944: Izler Solomon Notably, Solomon conducted the orchestra for 26 weekly broadcasts for Libby Owen
1942: Nikolai Malko
1944–1945: Jerzy Bojanowski

=== Guest conductors ===
- 1930: Gena Branscombe
- George Enescu
- Leonard Bernstein
- Leo Kopp (né Leo Laszlo Kopp)
- Frederick Stock

=== Guest soloists ===
- Lillian Waller (née Lillian Magnuson), pianist, was the first soloist with the orchestra. On August 23, 1924, she married Percy Harold Waller in Indiana.
- Leone Kruse, opera singer, notably, beginning 1927, with the Chicago Civic Opera, then went on to the Metropolitan Opera, the National Theatre Munich, and the German Opera Theater at Prague. Before launching her career, Kruse had been a scholarship student at the American Conservatory of Music. She later was on the faculty at the Cincinnati Conservatory of Music.
- Mae Doelling Schmidt, piano
- Theodora Troendle, piano

== Notable performances ==
- May 9, 1926: Inaugural concert in the Goodman Theater with violinist Amy Neill (Note: Amy Neill Amy Neill (née Amy Emerson Weldon Neill) owned, from 1921 to 1930, a violin made by Bartolomeo Giuseppe Guarneri, del Gesù, made in Cremona in 1736, nicknamed the "Count Cessol" violin: (Cozio online catalog No. 40422); the violin had formerly been owned by Virginia Ferni Teja (née Virginia Ferni), sister of violinist Carolina Ferni. Neill, on September 24, 1924, married Avern B. Scolnik, a lawyer and amateur albeit accomplished violinist and violin collector. They divorced sometime before 1952.) as guest soloist. Five men musicians filled chairs not yet filled by women.

Program:
- The Hebrides by Felix Mendelssohn
- Siegfried Idyll by Richard Wagner
- Violin Concerto No. 1 by Max Bruch
- Scènes Alsaciennes by Jules Massenet
- Two Elegiac Melodies by Edvard Grieg
- "Danse Bacchanale" by Camille Saint-Saëns (from Samson and Delilah)

- December 4, 1927: Composer Theodora Troendle joined the orchestra as the piano soloist to premiere her own piano concerto.
- 1934: Ford Symphony Gardens at the Century of Progress International Exhibition. Florence Price (1887–1953), composer; Margaret Bonds, piano soloist; Ebba Sundstrom, conductor. The program – devoted to women composers – honored Amy Beach and Carrie Jacobs-Bond. Along with other musical events from the exhibition, the performance was broadcast on WBBM CBS radio.
1. Piano Concerto in D minor by Florence Price (1887–1953); Margaret Bonds, piano

== Disambiguation ==
- Elena Moneak founded in 1924 an unrelated ensemble which was also named the Women's Symphony Orchestra of Chicago. That orchestra debuted at the Woman's World's Fair in Chicago in 1924 under the direction Moneak, conducting. It performed its final concert at the Woman's World Fair in 1928.
- In 1948, Bohumir Kryl led an ensemble named the Kryl's Women's Symphony Orchestra of Chicago, which was unrelated to the Women's Symphony Orchestra of Chicago.
