= Credo (Bonds) =

Credo (1965) is a large-scale musical composition by Margaret Bonds for soprano and baritone soloists, chorus, and orchestra. According to musicologist Helen Walker-Hill, Bonds considered Credo to be her "major opus."

== Background ==
Bonds originally hoped her friend and collaborator Langston Hughes would provide a libretto, but instead turned to W.E.B. Du Bois's 1904 prose poem for the text. Calling it her "largest symphonic score to date," she wrote to Hughes in November 1964 that she was focused on her work on the piece.

Upon completing the work, Bonds took Credo to Sam Fox Music, a publishing house which had previously published Bonds's successful The Ballad of the Brown King. However, the company refused to publish Credo unless Bonds toned down the language of Du Bois's poem, including changing "Especially do I believe in the Negro Race to "Especially do I believe in the human race." She also faced challenges getting the work recorded; although she was backed by conductor Albert McNeil, RCA Victor's artist and repertoire representative rejected the project.

The manuscript contains a dedication "In memory of Abbie Mitchell and Langston Hughes."

=== Premiere and reception ===
Credo, in its voice and piano reduction, was premiered at an all-Bonds concert in Washington, D.C. on March 12, 1967. The concert was organized by conductor and pedagogue Frederick Wilkerson (1903–1980). Credo was programmed as the "star" of the concert.

The orchestral version received its premiere on May 21, 1972, with the Los Angeles Philharmonic under the baton of Zubin Mehta. A reviewer for the Los Angeles Times described the piece as "...simple, lush, and lyrical."

== Composition ==
=== Text ===
W.E.B. DuBois's "Credo," written in the style of a religious creed, addresses issues of racism, imperialism, warfare, and argued that God created peoples of all races, which inherently makes them equal. The poem was widely read, and became an important text of the Civil Rights movement.

Credo

I believe in God who made of one blood all races that dwell on earth. I believe that all men, black and white, are brothers, varying through Time and Opportunity, in form and gift and feature, but differing in no essential particular, and alike in soul and in the possibility of infinite development.

Especially do I believe in the Negro Race; in the beauty of its genius, the sweetness of its soul, and its strength in that meekness which shall yet inherit this turbulent earth.

I believe in pride of race and lineage and self; in pride of self so deep as to scorn injustice to other selves; in pride of lineage so great as to despise no man’s father; in pride of race so chivalrous as neither to offer bastardy to the weak nor beg wedlock of the strong, knowing that men may be brothers in Christ, even though they be not brother-in-law.

I believe in Service–humble reverent service, from the blackening of boots to the whitening of souls; for Work is Heaven, Idleness is Hell, and Wage is the “Well done!” of the Master who summoned all them that labor and are heavy laden, making no distinction between the black sweating cotton-hands of Georgia and the First Families of Virginia, since all distinction not based on deed is devilish and not divine.

I believe in the Devil and his angels, who wantonly work to narrow the opportunity of struggling human beings, especially if they be black; who spit in the faces of the fallen, strike them that cannot strike again, believe the worst and work to prove it, hating the image which their Maker stamped on a brother’s soul.

I believe in the Prince of Peace. I believe that War is Murder. I believe that armies and navies are at bottom the tinsel and braggadocia of oppression and wrong; and I believe that the wicked conquest of weaker and darker nations by nations whiter and stronger but foreshadows the death of that strength.

I believe in Liberty for all men; the space to stretch their arms and their souls; the right to breathe and the right to vote, the freedom to choose their friends, enjoy the sunshine and ride on the railroads, uncursed by color; thinking, dreaming, working as they will in the kingdom of God and love.

I believe in the training of children, black even as white; the leading out of little souls into the green pastures and beside the still waters, not for pelf or peace, but for Life lit by some large vision of beauty and goodness and truth; lest we forget, and the sons of the fathers, like Esau, for mere meat barter their birthright in a mighty nation.

Finally, I believe in Patience–patience with the weakness of the Weak and the strength of the Strong, the prejudice of the Ignorant and the ignorance of the Blind; patience with the tardy triumph of Joy and the mad chastening of Sorrow–patience with God.

— W. E. B. Du Bois,

=== Music ===
The work can be divided into seven movements or sections. The first section is in the key of A minor, and sets the text beginning in "I believe in God who made of one blood.." The chorus begins with syncopated rhythms and parallel open fifths, creating a repeating motif that recurs throughout the work. Bonds uses fugues throughout this initial section, before reuniting the voices on the text "and alike in soul."

The second section features the solo soprano, begins with the words "Especially do I believe in the Negro Race..." modulates to A major, but uses a lowered seventh, centering the tonality in the Mixolydian mode.

== Discography ==
- Margaret Bonds: Credo. Performed by Dessoff Choirs and Symphony Orchestra. Compact disc, 2023, Avie Records – AV2589
