= Helen Kotas Hirsch =

American horn player (1916–2000)

Background information
- Born: June 7, 1916; Brookfield, Illinois, US
- Died: December 15, 2000 (aged 83–84); Chicago, US
- Occupation(s): Musician; Principal Horn
- Instrument: Horn

Helen Kotas Hirsch (June 7, 1916 – December 15, 2000) was an American horn player who played principal horn in the Chicago Symphony Orchestra. She was the first woman wind principal musician in any major American orchestra.

== Early life and education ==
Kotas was born to Czech parents on June 7, 1916, and grew up in Brookfield, Illinois. Her musical studies began at age six, when she started studying piano. In high school, she initially played cornet before taking up the horn.

Kotas studied horn with Frank Kyrl, of the Chicago Symphony, through high school and while attending Lyons Township Junior College. Kotas attended college at the University of Chicago, where she earned an undergraduate degree in psychology in 1936. While there, she began studying horn with Louis Dufrasne, of the Chicago NBC Orchestra.

Kotas's first horn was a Wunderlich single F horn, given to her by her father. In college, she began playing a Geyer double horn, given to her by her sister. She continued to play Geyer horns and mouthpieces throughout her career.

== Career ==
Kotas's orchestral experience began when she was a teenager. At age 14, she joined the Women's Symphony Orchestra of Chicago as fourth horn, moving to first horn the following year. She also played first horn in the West Suburban Symphony Orchestra. After college, Kotas played with the Chicago Civic Orchestra and had her first engagement playing with the Chicago Symphony as an extra under conductor Frederick Stock. In 1940 and 1941, Kotas played summer tours in Leopold Stokowski's All-American Youth Orchestra.

After auditioning for Fritz Reiner in 1940, Kotas won the position of third horn with the Pittsburgh Symphony. When Philip Farkas resigned from the Chicago Symphony the following year in 1941, Stock wanted Kotas for the Chicago position. Stock contacted Reiner, who agreed to let Kotas out of her contract. Prior to Kotas's appointment as principal horn with the Chicago Symphony, the only woman to serve as a principal player in that or any other major U.S. orchestra played the harp. James Chambers succeeded Kotas as third horn in Pittsburgh.

Kotas joined the Chicago Symphony beginning with the 1941–42 season and remained in the position of principal horn until 1947. In 1947, Philip Farkas returned to the orchestra as principal horn under conductor Artur Rodzinski. Rodzinski used a loophole in Kotas's contract to move her to another position in the horn section, and after sitting out, Kotas left the orchestra in 1948.

After leaving the Chicago Symphony, Kotas remained in Chicago. She played principal horn in the Grant Park Symphony from 1950 to 1958 and multiple positions with the horn section of the Chicago Lyric Opera orchestra from 1954 to 1965. In 1953, Reiner, having moved to conduct the Chicago Symphony, invited her to return to that orchestra. She declined the invitation and continued to play in her other orchestral positions.

Kotas taught at the American Conservatory, Wheaton College, and the Sherwood Conservatory. Her students included American hornist and historical horn maker Lowell Greer.

== Personal life ==
Kotas married University of Chicago pathologist Edwin Hirsch in 1949. Her husband died in 1972.

Kotas served as the treasurer of the Hyde Park Union Church and participated in the women's philanthropy organization. She died in Chicago, as the result of a car striking her on her way to a reunion of former CSO musicians.

== Awards ==
- Pioneer Award, International Women's Brass Conference, 2012 (posthumous)
