= Margaret Bonds =

American composer and pianist (1913–1972)

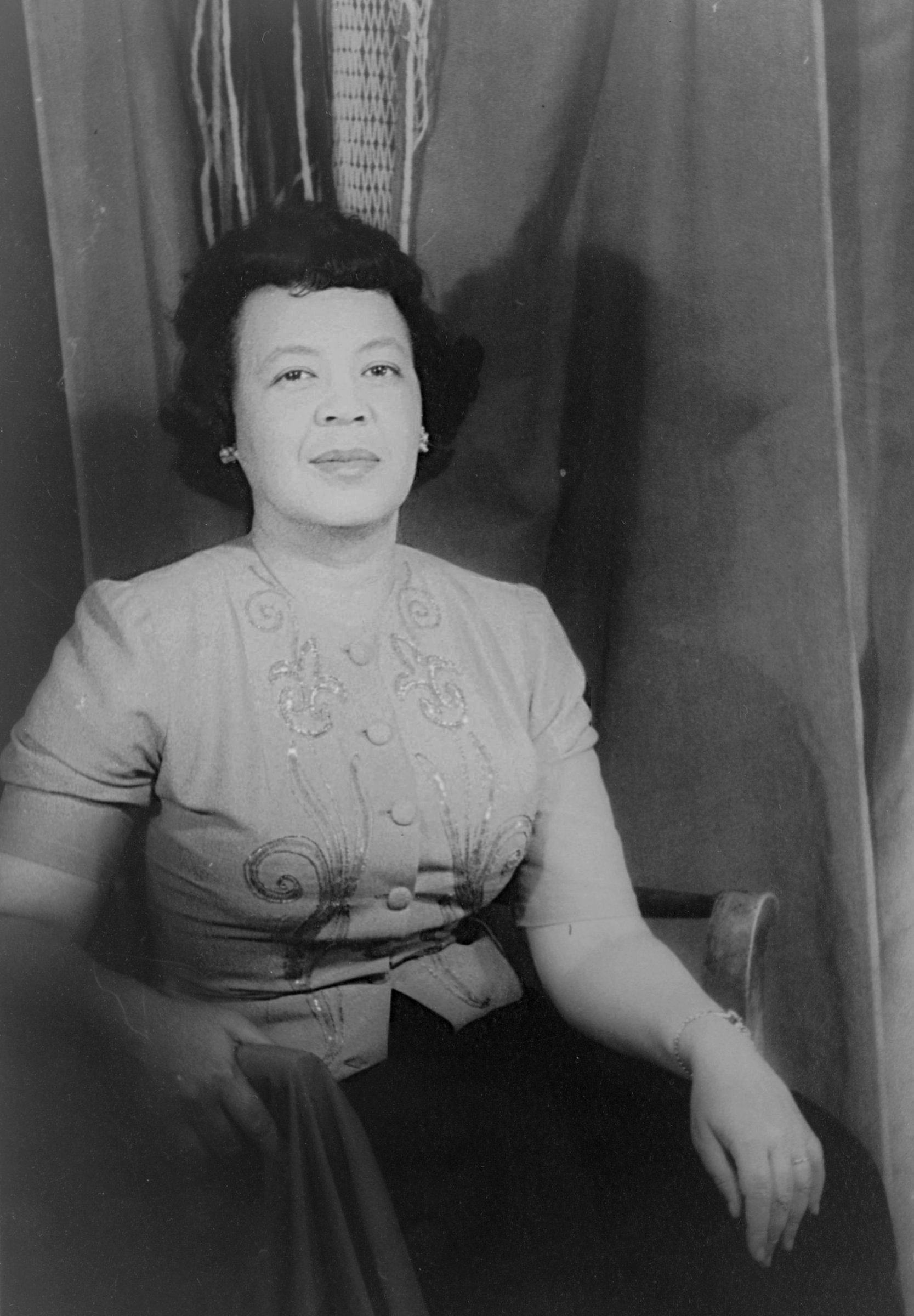
- Bonds in 1956
- Born: Margaret Allison Bonds; March 3, 1913; Chicago, Illinois, US
- Died: April 26, 1972 (aged 59); Los Angeles, California, US
- Education: Northwestern University
- Occupations: Composer, pianist
- Spouse: Lawrence Richardson (m. 1940)
- Relatives: Monroe Alpheus Majors (father)

Margaret Allison Bonds (March 3, 1913 – April 26, 1972) was an American composer, pianist, arranger, and teacher. One of the first Black composers and performers to gain recognition in the United States, she is best remembered today for her popular arrangements of African American spirituals and frequent collaborations with Langston Hughes. She was the first African American woman to perform with the all-White and all-male Chicago Symphony Orchestra, one of the first African American women to have her music broadcast on European radio, the first African American woman to have her music performed widely in Africa, only the second African American woman in classical music to be elected to full membership in ASCAP, and the first woman, Black or white, to win three awards from ASCAP.

== Life ==
=== Family background ===
Margaret Jeanette Allison Majors was born in Chicago, Illinois on March 3, 1913. Her father, Monroe Alpheus Majors, was an active force in the civil rights movement as a physician and writer. His work included founding a medical association for black physicians who were denied membership in the American Medical Association on the basis of race. As an author, Majors is known for his book, Noted Negro Women: Their Triumphs and Activities (1893), and for his work as editor of several African American newspapers. Her mother, Estella (Estelle) C. Bonds, was a church musician and member of the National Association of Negro Musicians. She died in 1952.

When her parents' troubled marriage was annulled in 1919, young Margaret's last name was changed to her mother's maiden name, Bonds. Despite the end of her parents' marriage, Margaret continued to stay in touch with her father, who, in 1920, wrote the first nursery rhyme storybook for African American children called First Steps and Nursery Rhymes; he dedicated it to 7-year-old Margaret.

=== Childhood ===
As a child, Margaret Bonds studied piano under the Coleridge Taylor Scholarship, which was awarded to her by the Coleridge Taylor School of Music, where her mother worked as an educator for 20 years. During this time, she, at the ages of both 8 and 9 years old, won piano scholarships from the Chicago Musical College. Margaret's piano teachers up until the age of 13 included her mother Estella Bonds, Martha B. Anderson, and Tom Theodore Taylor. At 13, she began studying with William Levi Dawson and Florence Price. Margaret's mother often hosted other Black musicians, artists, and writers in her home. Among those included Abbie Mitchell, Lillian Evanti, and composer Will Marion Cook, all of whom would become influential to her future musical studies and career.

By October 1939 Margaret Bonds, realizing that she wanted to be a published composer (a problem because there were relatively few music publishers in Chicago), moved to New York. On her twenty-seventh birthday (March 3, 1940), she married Lawrence Richardson, a probation officer, after moving to New York City in 1939. The couple later had a daughter, Djane Richardson. Margaret continued to be an active composer and touring musician throughout the 1960s and until her final days. She also dedicated her later life to promoting African American musicians of the time. In addition, she moved to Los Angeles in 1967 to compose music for film. In addition, she also wrote music for theatre and 2 ballets. With her move to Los Angeles, she assumed the music directorship with the Los Angeles Inner City Cultural Center and Repertory, where she composed and gave music lessons to local children. She spent the last five years of her life working there. Her last major work, Credo, was performed by the Los Angeles Philharmonic Orchestra one month after her death. She suffered from depression and alcoholism following the death of her friend Langston Hughes. Bonds died of a heart attack at age 59, on April 26, 1972, in Los Angeles, California.

== Education ==
=== Music Fundamentals ===
Besides her known education as a mentee of Florence Price, Margaret was first introduced to music education through her mother, Estella C. Bonds. Her parents divorced at an early age for her, so she spent most of her time in her mom's house and inherited her name. Her mother studied at the Chicago Musical College and was part of the National Association of Negro Musicians. She was also an organist and choir director for the Berean Baptist Church in Chicago. She supported the fine arts by hosting Sunday musicals in her home. The Bonds's household was a hub for artists and literary figures of the Chicago African American community. Influential people like sopranos and composers Will Marion Cook, Countee Cullen, Abbie Mitchell, Noble Sissle, Florence Price and Langston Hughes frequented as guests. From an early age, Margaret had musical talent, making her a child prodigy. Margaret won a scholarship to the Coleridge Taylor School of Music, where her mother taught.

=== Northwestern University ===
During high school, Bonds continued to study piano and composition with Florence Price and later with William Dawson. In 1929, at the young age of 16, Bonds began her studies at Northwestern University, where she earned both her Bachelor of Music (1933) and Master of Music (1934) degrees in piano and composition. She received applied for and received a fellowship from the Julian Rosenwald Fund to pursue her master's degree.

Discrimination Faced in Northwestern University

Bonds was one of the few Black students at Northwestern University; the environment was hostile, racist, and nearly unbearable. Although she was permitted to study at the university, she was not allowed to live on campus or use the library, practice facilities, or swimming pool. She took comfort in the poetry of Langston Hughes which speaks about the struggles of African Americans in society.

In an interview with James Hatch, she states:

I was in this prejudiced university, this terribly prejudiced place…. I was looking in the basement of the Evanston Public Library where they had the poetry. I came in contact with this wonderful poem, "The Negro Speaks of Rivers", and I'm sure it helped my feelings of security. Because in that poem he tells how great the black man is. And if I had any misgivings, which I would have to have – here you are in a setup where the restaurants won't serve you and you're going to college, you're sacrificing, trying to get through school – and I know that poem helped save me.

=== Juilliard School of Music ===
Bonds moved to New York City after graduating from Northwestern University. There she attended the Juilliard School and studied composition with Roy Harris, Robert Starer, and Emerson Harper, and piano with Djane Herz. She also studied with Walter Gossett. She pursued lessons with Nadia Boulanger, who after looking at her work said she needed no further study and refused to teach her. It is uncertain whether Boulanger truly thought Bonds had no need of further instruction or was acting out of racial prejudice. The work Boulanger saw is The Negro Speaks of Rivers, a setting for voice and piano of Langston Hughes's poem of the same title—the very poem that brought Bonds such comfort during her years at Northwestern University.

== Career ==
=== Chicago ===
Bonds was active in her career throughout her studies at Northwestern University. In 1932, Bonds' 1931 art song Sea Ghost won the prestigious national Wanamaker Foundation Prize, bringing her to the public's attention. On June 15, 1933, Bonds performed with the Chicago Symphony Orchestra—the first black person in history to do so—during its Century of Progress series (Concertino for Piano and Orchestra by John Alden Carpenter) in the Century of Progress World's Fair. In 1934 she would again perform in that fair – this time the Piano Concerto in D minor of her former teacher Florence Price, accompanied by the Woman's Symphony Orchestra of Chicago under the direction of Ebba Sundstrom.

After graduation, Bonds continued to teach, compose, and perform in Chicago, also touring widely with bass-baritone John Greene (1901–1967), soprano Catherine Van Buren (1907–2001) and soprano Etta Moten Barnett. Two of her notable students were Ned Rorem and Gerald Cook, with whom she performed piano duos in later years. In 1938, she opened the Allied Arts Academy where she taught art, music, and ballet. That same year, an adaptation of "Peach Tree Street" appeared in Gone With the Wind. She also taught Talib Rasul Hakim.

=== New York City ===
In October 1939, she moved to New York City where she edited music for a living and collaborated on several popular songs. She made her solo performing debut at Town Hall on February 7, 1952. Around this same time, she formed the Margaret Bonds Chamber Society, a group of black musicians which performed mainly the work of black classical composers. Bonds lived in Harlem, and worked on many music projects in the neighborhood. She helped to establish a Cultural Community Center, and served as the minister of music at a church in the area.

In November 1942 Bonds and her duo-piano partner Calvin Jackson relocated to Los Angeles, which was experiencing a surge in jobs and population due to the United States' entry into World War II, to work as a duo-piano team with the hope that they would be sufficiently successful for Bonds's husband and Jackson's girlfriend to move to the West Coast and join them. That "Western Adventure" (as Bonds would later term it) was difficult and less successful than hoped, but it introduced Bonds to the warm climate and beautiful landscapes of southern California, and she earned enough notoriety to be featured (along with Jackson) on Mary Astor's Showcase in March 1943.

Margaret Bonds returned to New York in March, 1943, and would remain there (aside from tours) until November 1967. Upon her return she quickly immersed herself in the city's vibrant concert life, performing widely as well as building up a large private studio of piano students. She also had six years of private piano lessons from Djane Lavoie-Hertz, a former student of Schnabel and Scriabin, and took pride in passing along to her students from the underserved African American communities of New York "the same principles employed by Solomon, Rubinstein, and Horowitz". Among Bonds' works from the 1950s is The Ballad of the Brown King, a large-scale work which was first performed in December 1954 in New York. It tells the story of the Three Wise Men, focusing primarily on Balthazar, the so-called "brown king". It was originally written for voice and piano, but later revised for chorus, soloists, and orchestra, and eventually televised by CBS in 1960. A large work in nine movements, the piece combines elements of various black musical traditions, such as jazz, blues, calypso, and spirituals. Bonds was writing other works during this period of her career: Three Dream Portraits for voice and piano, again setting Hughes' poetry, were published in 1959. D minor Mass for chorus and organ was first performed in the same year.

As an outgrowth of her compositions for voice, Bonds later became active in the theater, serving as music director for numerous productions and writing two ballets. In 1964, Bonds wrote Montgomery Variations for orchestra, a set of seven programmatic variations on the spiritual "I Want Jesus to Walk with Me." Bonds penned a program for the work which explains that it centered on Southern Blacks' decision no longer to accept the segregationist policies of the Jim Crow South, focusing on the Montgomery Bus Boycotts and the 1963 bombing of the Sixteenth Street Baptist Church in Birmingham. Bonds shared the completed work with Ned Rorem, a close friend and former student, in 1964. She eventually dedicated the work to Martin Luther King Jr. In 1967, legendary choral director and vocal coach Frederick Wilkerson featured the original piano/vocal version of her setting of W.E.B. Du Bois's civil-rights manifesto "Credo" in the first all-Bonds concert in Washington, D.C., and later that year the likewise legendary choral conductor Albert McNeil performed the choral/orchestral version of that same work, along with The Montgomery Variations, in San Francisco.

=== Los Angeles ===
Margaret Bonds had been deeply disturbed by the Watts Rebellion in Los Angeles in 1965, and early in 1966 she began clearing her calendar of obligations in New York. By November 1967 she was ready to move to Los Angeles, working as music director and teaching piano at the Los Angeles Inner City Institute and at the Inner City Cultural Center. Also in 1967, Bonds composed Troubled Water, a piano piece that melds spiritual melody with jazz and classical features. In 1972 the Los Angeles Philharmonic performed her Credo for chorus and orchestra (which had already been performed in Washington, D.C., in 1965 and San Francisco in 1967). Bonds died unexpectedly a few months later, shortly after her 59th birthday.

=== Collaborations with Langston Hughes ===
Langston Hughes (1901–1967) was a prolific African American poet and writer. Hughes and Bonds became great friends after meeting in person in 1936, and she set much of his work to music. On May 22, 1952, Hughes (poet), Bonds (pianist), and Daniel Andrews (baritone) collaborated on a project called "An Evening of Music and Poetry in Negro Life", which they performed at Community Church. This project took place just months after Bonds' debut solo performance at Town Hall in New York City, February 7, 1952. Ever a good friend, Hughes sent Bonds a telegram the afternoon of her performance, telling her how much he desired to be present and sending his best wishes.

Bonds wrote several music-theater works. In 1959, she set music to Shakespeare in Harlem, a libretto by Hughes. It premiered in 1960 at the 41st Street Theater. Other collaborations include "The Negro Speaks of Rivers", "Songs of the Seasons", and "Three Dream Portraits". Another work based on a text by Langston Hughes was first performed in February 2018 in Washington, DC, by the Georgetown University Concert Choir under Frederick Binkholder. Entitled "Simon Bore the Cross", it is a cantata for piano and voice, and is based on the spiritual "He Never Said a Mumblin' Word".

The death of Langston Hughes in 1967 was difficult for Bonds. Afterward, she left her husband and daughter to move from New York to Los Angeles where she remained until her death on April 26, 1972.

=== Memberships ===
- National Association of Negro Musicians' Junior Music Association (High School)
- Alpha Kappa Alpha sorority
- National Guild of Piano Teachers (1951)
- American Musicians' Welfare Association (1951)
- National Association of Colored Women's Clubs (1962)

=== Awards ===
- Rosenwald Fellowship
- Rodman Wanamaker Award for Composition (1932)

== Legacy ==
Margaret Bonds died intestate on April 26, 1972. She was found in her apartment on April 28. Her lease was paid through the end of the day on the 30th. Her husband, Larry Richardson, and her daughter, Djane Richardson, were contacted midday on the 28th and had to get from New York to Los Angeles, make arrangements for the body, and gather as much as they could from her two-bedroom apartment in Los Angeles (two suitcases each). As a result of this rushed and confusing situation, most of the contents of her apartment went directly to a Los Angeles landfill after day's end on April 30, 1972.

The materials that her husband and daughter were able to gather returned to New York with them. Larry Richardson eventually donated most of his portion to the Schomburg Center for Research in Black Culture, while Djane Richardson retained hers. They were still in her possession at her own intestate death in an automobile accident in 2011.

Although it has been said. that no "one owns the rights to [Bonds's] music," this claim is false. In 2015 her nieces and nephews on the Richardson side of the family were declared legal heirs to the estate of Margaret Bonds. They are the owners of copyright to her music, apart from the individual works whose copyrights were originally assigned to publishers and, if those assignments were made before 1963, those copyrights have been renewed. Thus, Theodore Presser retains its copyright on "He's Got the Whole World in His Hand."

Most of the Margaret Bonds materials that were in the possession of Larry Richardson now comprise the Margaret Bonds papers of the New York Public Library's Schomburg Center for Research in Black Culture (shelfmark MG 873). The materials that were in the possession of daughter Djane Richardson until her own death, intestate with no heirs, in 2011. The contents of her apartment went into an "unclaimed property" storage unit for a time, but eventually Doyle Auctioneers and Appraisers acquired six large boxes of these, placing them up for auction in November, 2012. Some of the boxes they auctioned were purchased by the Beinecke Rare Book and Manuscript Library at Yale University. These boxes’ materials now constitute the Margaret Bonds papers of the James Weldon Johnson Memorial Collection of that repository (shelfmark JWJ MSS 121). Other boxes were not purchased by the Beinecke, however, and these went to a book fair in Washington D.C. At least some—perhaps all—of these remainders of the estate did not sell and were left beside a dumpster after the book fair ended. Like the contents of Bonds's L.A. apartment, these were destined for the landfill. However, overnight that night a music dealer, searching the fair's leftovers after hours, found them and retrieved them. Through his efforts and those of three booksellers (Gabriel Boyers, Schubertiade Music and Arts; Harry Nudel, Nudel Books; and Henry Wessells, James Cummins Bookseller), the thousands of pages of D.C. Bondsiana then ended up in the Booth Family Center for Special Collections in the Georgetown University Libraries in Washington, D.C. (shelfmark GTM-130530).

Margaret Bonds did much to promote the music of black musicians. Her own compositions and lyrics addressed racial issues of the time. The performance with the Chicago Symphony Orchestra was an historical moment, marking the first occasion a black performer had performed with them as soloist. Bonds connected her father's political activism with her mother's sense of musicianship. In addition, many well-known arrangements of African American spirituals (He's Got the Whole World in His Hands) were created by Bonds, the most popular being her setting in 1962 for Leontyne Price.

Margaret Bonds's works will not enter the public domain until “2042, 2060, or 2085, depending on your interpretation of the law.”

== Major works ==
- Don't You Want to Be Free, music-theater work (1938), text by Langston Hughes
- Wings over Broadway, orchestra (1940)
- Tropics After Dark, musical-theater work (1940)
- The Negro Speaks of Rivers, voice and piano (1942)
- Troubled Water, piano
- The Ballad of the Brown King, chorus, soloists, and orchestra (1954)
- Songs of the Seasons, voice and piano (1955)
- Three Dream Portraits, voice and piano (1959)
- Mass in D minor, chorus and organ (1959)
- Shakespeare in Harlem, music-theater work (1959), text by Langston Hughes
- U.S.A., music-theater work, text by John Dos Passos
- Joshua Fit De Battle of Jericho, voice and orchestra (1959)
- Ballad of the Brown King, chorus and orchestra (1960)
- Fields of Wonder, men's voices (1963)
- Montgomery Variations, orchestra (1964)
- Credo, S solo, Bar solo, chorus and orchestra (1965)

== Recordings ==
In the 1960s, Leontyne Price, the first African American opera singer to become internationally famous, commissioned and recorded some of Bonds' arrangements of spirituals. Some of Bonds' music, mainly piano pieces and art songs, has been recorded on various labels, mostly on compilation albums of music by black composers. In 2019 the premiere recording of The Ballad of the Brown King (performed by The Dessoff Choirs and Orchestra) was released on the Avie label.
