= Stella P. Roberts =

American musician (1899-1988)

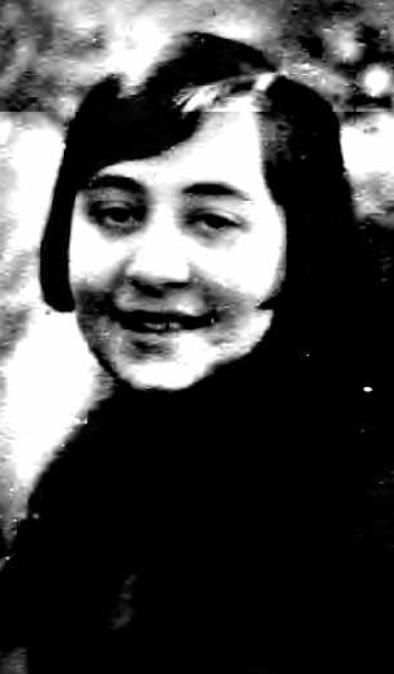
- Roberts, from her 1924 passport application
- Born: Stella Pauline Roberts; April 26, 1899; Chicago, Illinois, U.S.
- Died: August 29, 1988 (aged 89); Cherry Hill, New Jersey, U.S.
- Occupations: Violist, music educator

Stella Pauline Roberts (April 26, 1899 – August 29, 1988) was an American violist and music educator. She played first viola in the Women's Symphony Orchestra of Chicago, and taught music theory and composition at the American Conservatory of Music for over fifty years.

== Early life and education ==
Roberts was born in Chicago, the eldest of the six daughters born to Francis Eugene Roberts and Nellie Pauline McLean Roberts. Two of her sisters died in infancy, and her sister Marion Mahan Roberts, a pianist with whom she often performed, was murdered in 1927.

Roberts studied with violinists Winifred Townsend, and Nadia Boulanger. While she was a student at the American Conservatory of Music, one of her classmates was composer Ruth Crawford Seeger. Roberts earned a master's degree in music at the Sorbonne.

== Career ==
Roberts gave concerts and played on radio programs. She and her sister Marion and cellist Genevieve Brown toured in Europe in 1924, as the Roberts-Brown Trio. She belonged to the Musicians' Club of Women. In 1929 she performed with the Amy Neill String Quartet, with Amy Neill, Charlotte Polak, and Lois Bichl. In 1932 she played at a dinner of the Oak Park Civic Music Association. She played first viola in the Women's Symphony Orchestra of Chicago during the 1940s.

Roberts taught music theory and composition at the American Conservatory of Music from the 1920s to the 1970s. Her students included violinist James Adair, composer Irene Britton Smith and composer and musician Henry Threadgill. She judged a song contest sponsored by the Chicago Singing Teachers Guild in 1955. In her later years, she hosted Music Room, a Chicago television program in which she and her students discussed and performed music.

== Publications ==
- "The Education of the Ear" (1959)
- A Handbook of Modal Counterpoint (1967, with Irwin Fischer)

== Personal life ==
Roberts died in 1988, at the age of 89, in Cherry Hill, New Jersey. Her papers are in the Newberry Library.
