= Paul von Klenau =

Danish-born composer (1883–1946)

Paul August von Klenau (11 February 1883 – 31 August 1946) was a Danish-born composer who worked primarily in Germany and Austria.

== Biography ==
Klenau was born in Copenhagen, where he studied under Otto Malling. Already as a young man he left his native country to study and work in Germany and Austria, among others with Max Bruch, Ludwig Thuille and Max von Schillings. His first, Bruckner-influenced symphony was premiered successfully in 1908 at a Tonkünstlerfest in Munich. Within just five years the three additional large-scale symphonies followed. Later influences include French music, Richard Strauss, and Arnold Schoenberg's twelve-tone technique. Klenau was among Schoenberg's advocates during the 1920s, and Schoenberg attended a concert of his music conducted by Klenau in 1923 in Freiburg. He also belonged to Alban Berg's circle of friends.

Klenau never achieved full recognition as a composer in Denmark, but he held a number of important conducting positions. In 1912, he led the concerts of the Bach Society Frankfurt, but already the following year he returned to the conductor position at the Freiburg Opera. He took up permanent residence in Bavaria, where he owned a country house, but as a conductor he traveled extensively, both in Germany and the United Kingdom. His summers were spent in Denmark. In 1922, he became a choral conductor at the Vienna Konzerthausgesellschaft, where he served until 1930, the last six years as Konzertdirektor.

After the first orchestral period that lasted until around the outbreak of the First World War, Klenau shifted his focus to musical drama. From 1913 to 1940, he wrote seven operas (not counting the early opera-oratorio Sulamith). The Nordic-mythological opera Kjartan und Gudrun (1918, rev. 1924) was premiered by Wilhelm Furtwängler in Mannheim. This work was followed in 1926 by the comic opera Die Lästerschule (after Sheridan's The School for Scandal). Between 1933 and 1939, Klenau composed three major twelve-tone operas: Michael Kohlhaas (after Kleist), Rembrandt van Rijn and Elisabeth von England. His last opera, Elisabeth von England was performed in 1941 at the Royal Theatre in Copenhagen as (probably) its first twelve-tone opera ever; it was also among the few works by Klenau to be performed in his native Denmark during his lifetime.

Klenau lived in Vienna until deafness prevented him from continuing his conducting career. In 1940 he returned to Copenhagen, where he remained until his death in 1946, aged 63. In the years around 1940, he returned to orchestral music with his three late symphonies: Triptikon (No. 5, 1939), the Nordische Symphonie (No. 6, 1940) and the Sturmsymphonie (No. 7, 1941). These works were written in a much more restrained style than his earlier symphonies. He also came to write an 8th symphony. A 9th Symphony, whose existence had remained unknown for decades, was recovered by Klenau's heirs in 2005. The work, written for large orchestra, chorus and soloists, has been described as "the most comprehensive symphony ever written by a Dane"

== Reputation ==
Klenau's role under National Socialism has been the subject of discussion. Fred Prieberg characterizes Klenau's relationship with the Nazis as one of mutual opportunism: for the régime, he could be useful as a campaigner for cultural ties between Germany and Denmark; for Klenau this attitude opened doors that remained closed to others. By way of example, Prieberg cites the seemingly unproblematic premiere of Klenau's three twelve-tone operas in a time when twelve-tone techniques were condemned as "cultural Bolshevism".

According to Schoenberg, Klenau once defended his use of the twelve-tone technique as the basis of an opera as an example of National Socialist art, making an analogy with the Führerprinzip, where everything in the piece needed to follow the leader. This, and a political analogy made by Socialist composers, Schoenberg equally derided as "nonsense." He refers to Klenau as "the German composer, Paul von Klenau".

Klenau's musical output, some of which is undergoing recording revival, includes nine symphonies (spanning the year 1907-1945), three string quartets, and a setting (1919) of Rainer Maria Rilke's "Die Weise von Liebe und Tod des Cornets Christoph Rilke" among other works. The Dacapo label has issued a recording of Die Weise, as well as the string quartets five of the symphonies, the Violin Concerto (1941) and the Piano Concerto (1944).

== Works (selection) ==
=== Operas ===
- Sulamith (1913)
- Kjarten und Gudrun (1918)
- Die Lästerschule (1925)
- Michael Kohlhaas (1933)
- Rembrandt van Rijn (1936)
- Elisabeth von England (1941)

=== Ballets ===
- Klein Idas Blumen (1916)
- Marion (1920)

=== Symphonies ===
- Symphony No. 1 in F minor (1908)
- Symphony No. 2 (1911)
- Symphony No. 3 (1913)
- Symphony No. 4 Dante-Symphonie (1913)
- Symphony No. 5 Triptikon (1939)
- Symphony No. 6 Nordische Symphonie (1940)
- Symphony No. 7 Die Sturmsymphonie (1941)
- Symphony No. 8 Im Alten Stil (1942)
- Symphony No. 9 (1945)

=== Orchestral ===
- Paolo und Francesca, symphonic fantasy (1913)
- Gespräche mit dem Tod, song cycle with orchestra (1916)
- Jahrmarkt bei London, symphonic poem (1922)
- Altdeutsche Liedersuite for orchestra (1934)
- Festsymphonie (1938)
- Violin Concerto (1941)
- Piano Concerto (1944)
- Musik nach Weisen der Minnesänger für Orchester

=== Choral ===
- Die Weise von Liebe und Tod des Kornetts Christoph Rilke cantata (1918)

=== Chamber music ===
- String Quartet No. 1 in E minor (1911)
- String Quartet No. 2 (1942)
- String Quartet No. 3 (1943)

=== Piano solo ===
- 9 Pieces (1915)
- 3 Stimmungen (1918)
- Sonata in F minor
- Sonatina in E major
