= Gladys Welge =

American musician (1902–1976)

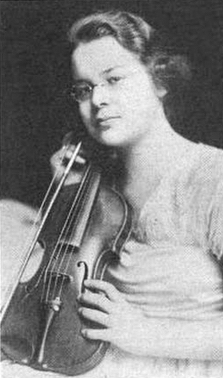
- Gladys Welge as a young woman, from a 1919 publication
- Born: May 23, 1902; Austin, Illinois
- Died: July 27, 1976 (aged 74); California
- Occupations: Violinist, conductor

Gladys Louise Welge (May 23, 1902 – July 27, 1976) was an American violinist and conductor. She was the conductor of the Woman's Symphony Orchestra of Chicago from 1938 to 1940. She was also founder of the Symphony of Oak Park and River Forest, one of the longest-surviving community orchestras in the United States.

== Early life ==
Gladys Louise Welge was born in Austin, Illinois (near Chicago), the daughter of Friedrich Welge and Friedericke J. Aron Welge. Both of her parents were born in Chicago; her Welge grandparents were from Hannover in Germany. She studied violin with Leon Sametini. Her brother Vernon Welge was a pianist.

== Career ==
Welge was a performing violinist based in Chicago, "one of the extremely good and altogether agreeable young players of the city". In 1919, Welge opened the Welge School of Music in Chicago, with her brother Vernon. She taught violin there and conducted the school's twenty-piece orchestra.

In 1931, Welge was founder of the Symphony of Oak Park and River Forest, one of the longest-surviving community orchestras in the United States. She was conductor of the Symphony from its founding in 1931 until she retired to Fontana, Wisconsin in 1954.

Welge was a violinist in the Woman's Symphony Orchestra of Chicago, and after conducting summer concerts at Grant Park, succeeded Ebba Sundstrom as the orchestra's conductor from 1938 to 1940. She was admired for her "strikingly forceful, even dynamic conducting", but limited to conducting primarily at rehearsals; male guest conductors took the podium at most of their concerts.

She moved to California by 1963, where she was a music director at a church in Laguna Beach, and conducted the Laguna Hills String Ensemble.

== Personal life ==
Gladys Welge died in 1976, aged 74 years, in California.
