= Winifred Townsend =

American violinist (c. 1876–1965)

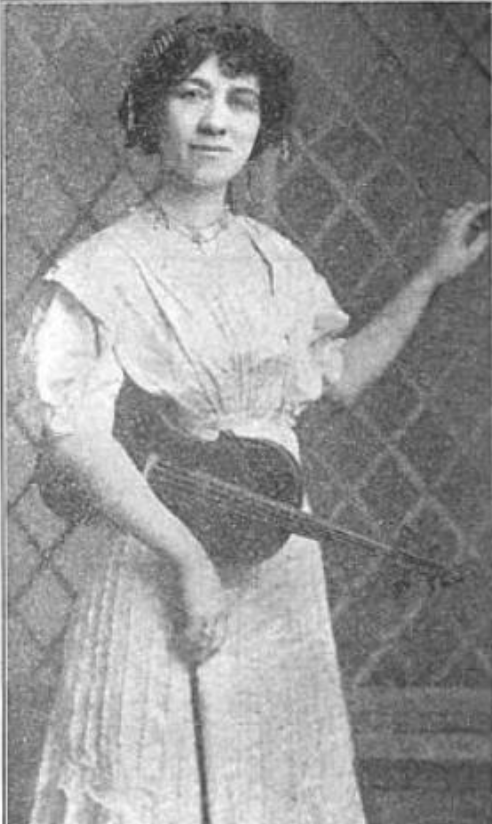
- Townsend with her violin, from a 1913 publication
- Born: Winifred Amy Townsend; 1870s
- Died: September 27, 1965; Winnetka, Illinois, U.S.
- Other names: Winifred Townsend Cree
- Occupations: Violinist, music teacher

Winifred Amy Townsend Cree (about 1876 – September 27, 1965) was an American violinist and music educator, based in Chicago. She headed the Winifred Townsend Concert Company, a trio of performers touring on the Chautauqua circuit in the 1910s. She was a member of the Women's Symphony Orchestra of Chicago in the 1920s.

== Early life and education ==
Townsend was born in Iowa, the daughter of Frank H. Townsend and Madge Lambert Townsend. She won a gold medal studying with Bernhard Listeman at the Chicago Musical College in 1897, and earned a diploma at the American Violin School, Chicago, in 1902. She also studied violin in Paris, with Albert Geloso.

== Career ==
Townsend played a 1771 Storioni violin. In 1904 she toured in the MIdwest with her sister Faerie Townsend, a singer and dramatic reader, and a baritone named De Loss Smith. From 1909, she headed the Bostonia Concert Company, also known as Winifred Townsend Concert Company, a musical ensemble that toured the United States in the 1910s, often on the Chautauqua circuit. The other members of the group were her sister Faerie and her sister's eventual husband, Ralph Walker, who played cello and piano, and sang baritone. They toured for at least seven seasons, and their show included costumes, child impersonations, readings, and a short operetta composed by Townsend and Ralph Walker. In 1917 the performed for the inmates at Leavenworth Penitentiary in Kansas, and they entertained troops at military bases and YMCAs during World War I.

In the 1920s, Townsend was a soloist and concertmeister with the Winona Orchestra in Indiana, and a member of the Women's Symphony Orchestra of Chicago. She formed the Townsend String Quartet with other members of the Women's Symphony Orchestra. In 1928 Townsend performed with an all-female ensemble for the Lake View Musical Society.

Townsend also taught violin in the Chicago area, including at Kimball Hall. Ruth Ray and Nesta Smith were among her students, and music professor and violist Stella P. Roberts. Her nephew Robert Walker was also one of her violin students.

== Personal life ==
Townsend married dentist Charles Garfield Cree in 1910 and had a daughter, Margaret. Her husband died in 1938, and Winifred Townsend Cree died in 1965, in Winnetka, Illinois, in her late eighties.
