= Ella May Walker =

Canadian-American artist, author, and composer

Ella May Jacoby Walker (14 May 1892 – 6 April 1960) was a Canadian American artist, author, and composer.

== Music ==
Walker was born in Windom, Minnesota. Her family moved to Dundurn, Saskatchewan, in 1902. She studied music at McGill Conservatory and Northwestern University. Her teachers included Percy Grainger, Arne Oldberg, Dean P.C. Sutkin, Alfred White, and Norman Wilks. In 1913 she married Osman J. Walker and they had two sons, Jim and Wilfrid.

The family moved to Edmonton, Canada, in 1920, where Walker taught piano, helped stage theatrical productions, and joined the Edmonton Art Club. She worked as an organist at Knox Church and played organ for silent movies in the Allen Theatre.

== Art ==
During the 1930s, Walker met Arthur Lismer, a Group of Seven Canadian landscape painter, who inspired her to change her focus from music to art. She sculpted and painted historic buildings in Edmonton. Walker served as president of the Edmonton Chapter of the Alberta Society of Artists and as vice-president of the Edmonton Art Club. She taught sculpture and painting through the University of Alberta Faculty of Extension and was a member of the Faculty Women’s Club.

== Writing ==
Walker wrote articles, including music criticism, for the Edmonton Journal and the People's Weekly newspaper. She wrote a novel of short stories about Edmonton's history and development called Fortress North.

== Legacy ==
When Edmonton's Archives and Landmarks Committee was created in 1947, Walker joined and remained a member through 1953. She was instrumental in researching, identifying, and preserving local historic landmarks.

After Walker's death, her sons donated her artwork and records to the Edmonton City Archives and created the Ella May Walker Memorial Award, a scholarship for students at the University of Alberta. In 1975, Walker posthumously received one of the first Edmonton Historical Board Recognition Awards.

In addition to her paintings, sculptures, and novel Fortress North, Walker composed a piano piece called Whirlwind Waltz, and a work for chorus called The Eternal Guest.
