= Mildred Lund Tyson =

American choral director (1895–1989)

Mildred Lund Tyson (10 March 1895 – 25 September 1989) was an American choral director, composer, organist, and soprano.

== Biography ==
Tyson was born in Moline, Illinois, to Mary Helena Anderson and Oscar Fredrick Lund. She married Harold Canfield Tyson in 1927 and they had a daughter, Barbara, in 1930.

Tyson earned a B.M. at Northwestern University, where she studied with Carl Beecher, Arne Oldberg, and Walter Allen Stults. She later studied composition at Columbia University, the Eastman School of Music, and at a summer course at Ithaca College. She studied voice with Edward Meyer in Los Angeles and Frederick Bristol in New York City.

From 1930 to 1934, Tyson taught piano and voice at Pomona College in Claremont, California. From 1935 to 1940 she was a soprano soloist at St. Thomas Episcopal Church Complex in Mamaroneck, New York. From 1948 to 1982, she was the organist and choir director at the First Congregational Church in Sidney, New York.

Tyson belonged to the American Society of Composers, Authors, and Publishers (ASCAP). Her music was published by G. Schirmer Inc.

== Compositions ==
Her vocal compositions include:

- "Great Divide" (voice and piano; text by Lew Sarett)
- "Keep Loving Me, Dear" (soprano or women's chorus and piano; text by Lillian Hanan Jackson)
- "Like Barley Bending" (soprano or women's chorus and piano; text by Sara Teasdale)
- "Lilacs are in Bloom" (soprano or women's chorus and piano; text by George Moore)
- "May in Japan" (women's chorus and piano)
- "(The) Moon's a Hoop" (voice and piano; text by Vachel Lindsay)
- "New York, Great Empire State" (voice and piano)
- "Noon and Night" (voice and piano; text by Herbert Trench)
- "One Little Cloud" (voice or women's chorus and piano)
- "Prosperity" (voice and piano; text by Nan Roads)
- "Reaching for the Moon" (voice and piano)
- "Sea Moods" (voice or chorus and piano; text Kenneth G. Benham)
- "Will Spring Be Far Behind?" (voice and piano)
