= Harriet Ware (composer) =

American classical composer (1877–1962)

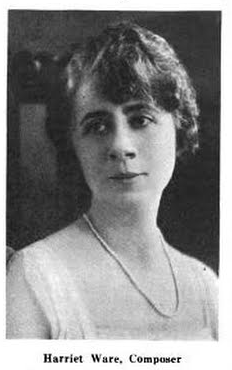
Harriet Ware, from a 1921 publication.

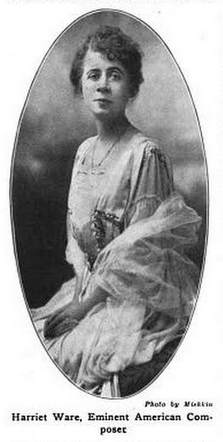
Harriet Ware, from a 1917 publication.

Harriet Ware (August 26, 1877 – February 9, 1962) was an American composer, pianist, and music educator.

== Early life ==
Harriet Ware was born in Waupun, Wisconsin, the daughter of Silas Edward Ware and Emily Sperry Ware. She showed musical promise from an early age, and graduated from Pillsbury Conservatory of Music in 1895, with further studies in Paris and Berlin.

== Career ==
Harriet Ware composed songs, choral works, piano pieces, and at least one opera, Undine. Her "Hindu Slumber Song" (1909) and Call of Râdha (1909) were settings of poems by Sarojini Naidu. She also wrote settings of poems by Thomas Moore, Edwin Markham, Cale Young Rice, Elizabeth Barrett Browning, Richard Lovelace, Bayard Taylor, Joyce Kilmer, and Marie Van Vorst. She also wrote musical plays, The Morning Glory and The Varying Shore, both with Zoë Akins.

Her "Women's Triumphal March" was the official song of the General Federation of Women's Clubs in 1929, and her setting of Daniel A. Poling's poem "The Rose is Red" was the song of the American Mothers Association. Harriet Ware's works were especially popular in programs of American song, or in programs focused on women composers.

Harriet Ware saw the importance of women's clubs in supporting the arts, saying "Musicians do well to pin their faith to these aggregations of 'the people' rather than to the wealth or social influence of a few." She was a founder and leader of the Musical Art Society of Long Island. During World War I the society gave a concert of Ware's music, to benefit local wives and children of soldiers. She also served on the advisory council of the New York Music School Settlement. She was also active with the Musical Alliance of the United States, and served on a jury for the organization's national Girl Scout songwriting competition in 1918, along with composers Amy Beach, Gena Branscombe, Fay Foster and Margaret Ruthven Lang.

As a pianist, she toured in the American South in 1920. In 1937 she was touring the western United States, giving classes, interviews, and lectures, as well as performances. She heard one of her works conducted at the Hollywood Bowl by Hidemaro Konoye. For several years she ran a summer music school in Plainfield, New Jersey.

From 1926, she ran her own music publishing house, and was a member of the American Society of Composers, Authors and Publishers (ASCAP).

== Personal life ==
Harriet Ware married a chemical engineer, Hugh Montgomery Krumbhaar, in 1913; the bridal air she wrote for the cantata Sir Oluf was played at their wedding ceremony, and David Bispham sang her song "How Do I Love Thee?". She was widowed in 1950 and died in New York City in 1962, aged 84 years.
