= Arne Oldberg =

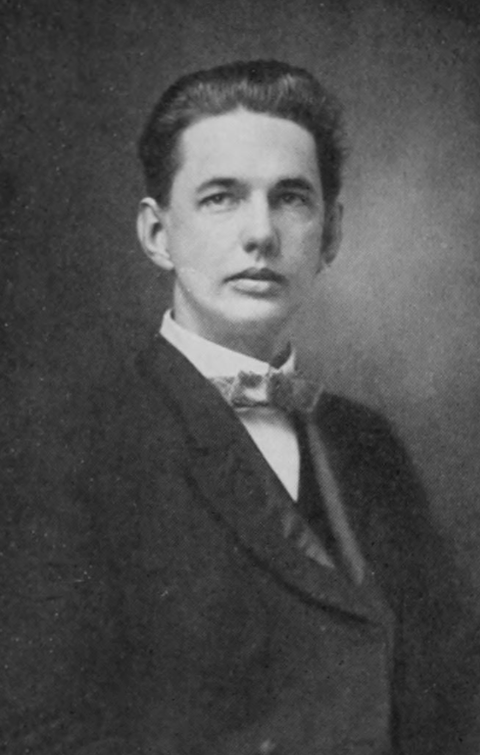
- Born: July 12, 1874; Youngstown, Ohio
- Died: February 17, 1962 (aged 87); Evanston, Illinois
- Burial place: Memorial Park Cemetery, Skokie
- Occupations: Pianist, composer, teacher
- Spouse: Mary Sloan (m. 1900)

Arne Oldberg (July 12, 1874 – February 17, 1962) was an American pianist, composer, and teacher. He spent his career on the faculty of Northwestern University (1897–1941), where he taught piano and composition and, from 1924 until his retirement in 1941, served as director of the graduate department of the Music School. Among his students were composers Howard Hanson, Cecilia Clare Bocard, Theodora Troendle, Mildred Lund Tyson, and Ella May Walker.

== Career ==
Arne Oldberg was born in Youngstown, Ohio on July 12, 1874. He began studying the piano at an early age, initially under the tutelage of his father, Oscar, a Swedish pharmaceutical chemist and amateur musician, and later at the Chicago Musical College under August Hyllested (1888–1892). He also studied composition and orchestration with Alolph Koelling, Frederick Grant Gleason, and Wilhelm Middelschulte. In 1893, Oldberg traveled to Vienna to study piano with Theodor Leschetizky. He returned to the U.S. in 1895, and, in 1897, Oldberg joined the music faculty of Northwestern University. In 1898, he returned to Europe for one year to study composition with Josef Rheinberger at the Academy of Fine Arts, Munich. Upon his return to the states in 1899, Oldberg accepted an instructorship on the faculty of Northwestern's School of Music. He married Mary Sloan in 1900.

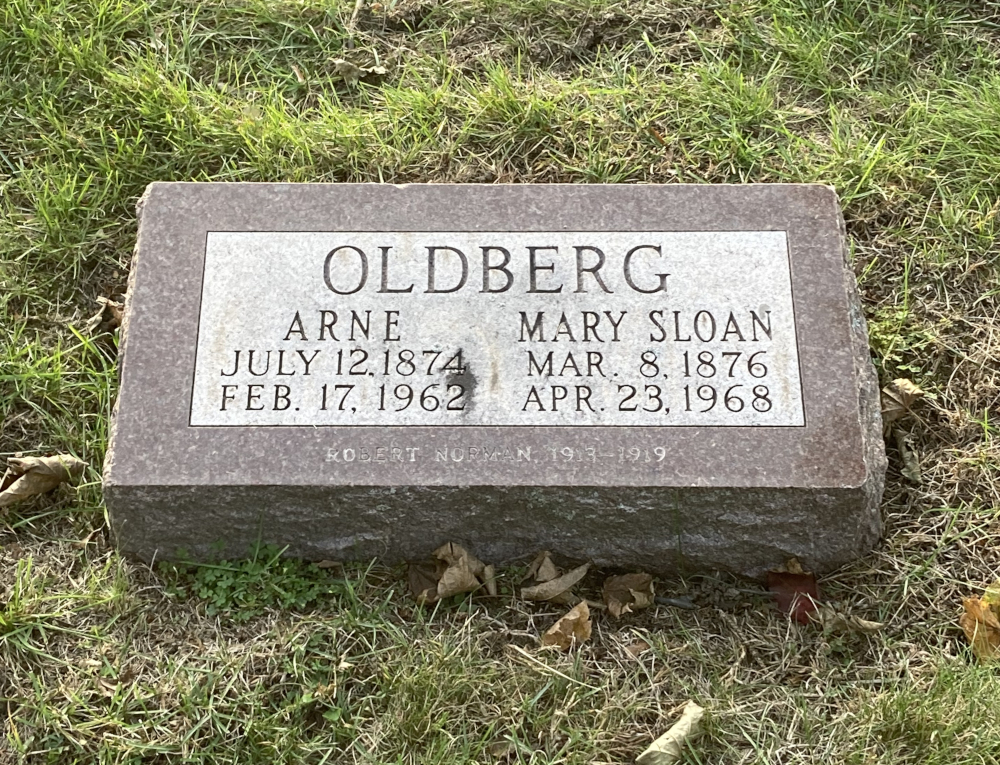
Oldberg's grave at Memorial Park Cemetery

He was subsequently appointed to Professor of Piano and Composition (1901-1941) and later served as the Director of the Piano Department (1919-1941) and Director of the Graduate Music Department (1924-1941). Oldberg was awarded an emeritus appointment in 1941. In addition to his 40-year tenure at Northwestern, Oldberg also taught as a guest professor of composition at the University of California, Los Angeles, for several summers in the 1930s; he also taught at Mount St. Mary's University (then Mount St. Mary's College) in Los Angeles.

He died at Evanston Hospital on February 17, 1962. He was buried at Memorial Park Cemetery in Skokie.

== Works ==
Oldberg's compositions include several concertos, including works for piano, violin, or horn with orchestra; chamber compositions; piano pieces; sonatas; and approximately twenty-five orchestral works, including at least six symphonies. Several of Oldberg's compositions have been performed by the Chicago Symphony Orchestra.

A large collection of Oldberg's manuscripts and professional papers is held at the Library of Congress. Additional archival collections containing manuscripts and papers from Oldberg's career are held at Northwestern University and the Eastman School of Music. Oldberg also made some private recordings of his compositions, performing himself on the piano: some of these – including the Cello Sonata (1934) and the Sextet for piano, horn, and strings (1950-1951) – were commercially released in 2026.
