= The Ballad of the Brown King =

Margaret Bonds cantata

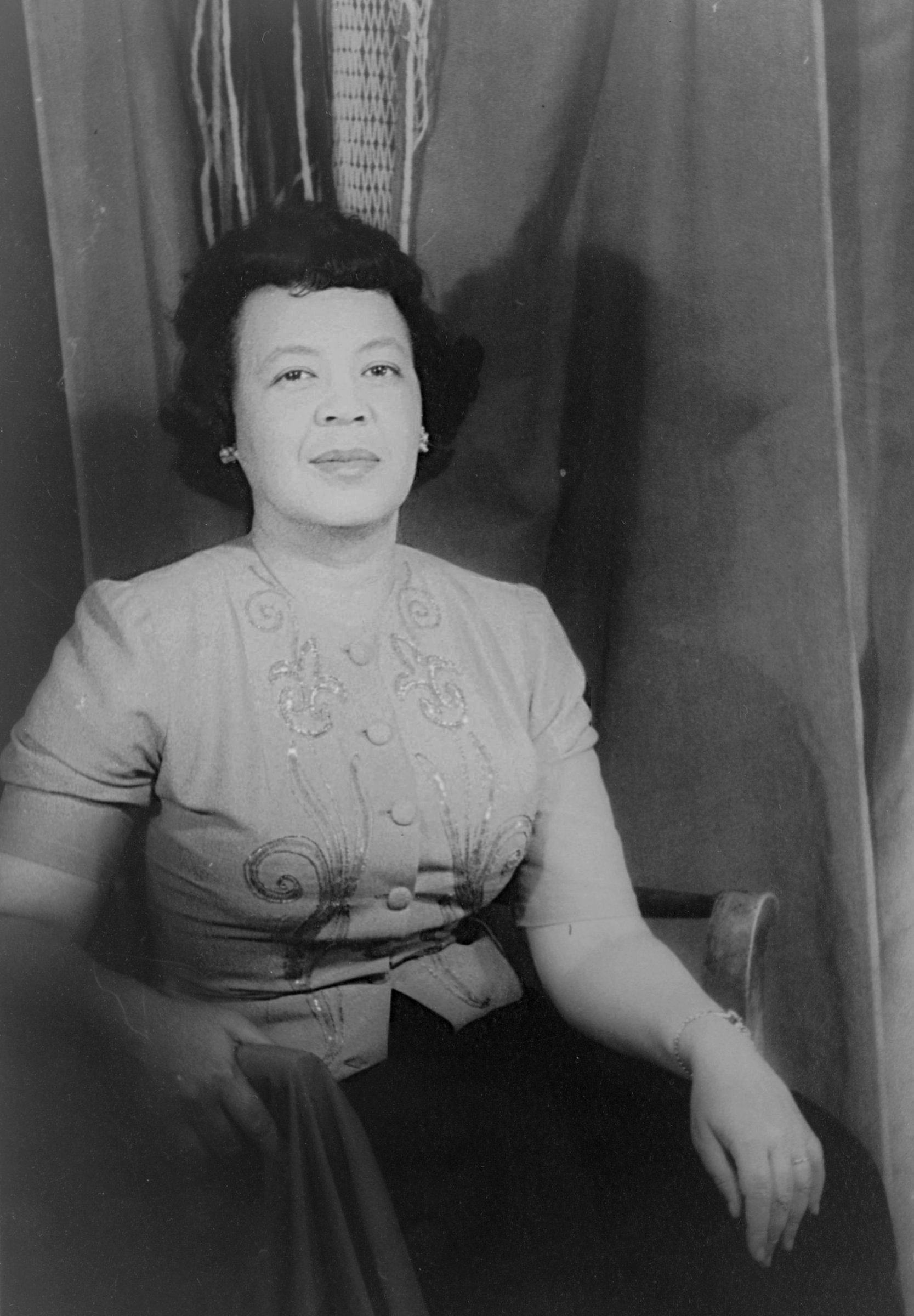
Margaret Bonds in 1956

The Ballad of the Brown King is a cantata by Margaret Bonds. It may be her most frequently performed work. It was written in honor of the African king Balthazar, with text written by Langston Hughes for Bonds. The Ballad premiered in December 1954 in New York City, performed by the George McClain Choir. This was a shorter version of the piece. Hughes and Bonds later expanded it to include full orchestration. The longer version was performed on December 11, 1960, and televised in a CBS special called "Christmas U.S.A." The 1960 performance was by the Westminster Choir.

A new orchestration of the piece by conductor Malcolm J. Merriweather was recorded in 2018 by the Dessoff Choirs and released on November 1, 2019. Bonds's original orchestration is unpublished and has never been recorded.

The cantata has nine movements, with parts for soprano, tenor, baritone, and choir. It includes "a combination of European, jazz, and Calypso music." Other musical influences include four-part hymn and gospel music. There are also "quasi-recitative sections" and blues-influenced sections.

Ballad focuses on one of the biblical Magi from the story of the birth of Jesus. Hughes chose the African king Balthazar as a way to "reinforce the image of African participation in the Nativity story."
