= Ebba Sundstrom Nylander =

20th century American violinist and conductor

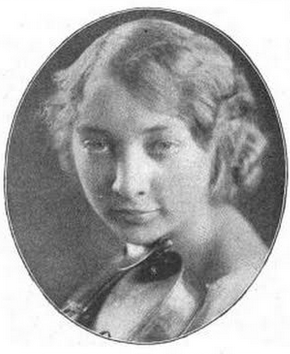
Ebba Sundstrom, from an advertisement in a 1920 publication.

Ebba Sundstrom Nylander (February 26, 1896 — January 5, 1963) was an American violinist and conductor, director of the Women's Symphony Orchestra of Chicago in the 1930s. She may have been the first American-born woman to conduct a full symphony orchestra.

== Early life ==
Ebba Sundstrom was born in Lindsborg, Kansas, a settlement of Swedish-immigrant farmers where her father was a carpenter. Both of her parents were musical, as founders of Lindsborg's Bethany Oratorio Society. She learned piano and violin as a child, and began performing for audiences and teaching violin when she was still a young teenager. She studied at the Minneapolis School of Music under Richard Czerwonky.

== Career ==
In the 1920s and 1930s, Sundstrom maintained a busy performing schedule, regularly appearing on stages in Chicago and Minneapolis, and in live radio concerts. She also taught violin at the Bush Conservatory of Music in Chicago. In 1929, she took over from Ethel Leginska the director position with the Woman's Symphony Orchestra of Chicago. After seven seasons conducting the orchestra, she took leave in 1937 for "study and travel". She did not return to the conductor's post, but by 1941 was teaching at North Park College, and conducting the school's orchestra, until she resigned from North Park in 1951.

Sundstrom often played with and for Swedish-American cultural groups, including the United Swedish Singers of Chicago, The Swedish Old People's Home Society, and the American Daughters of Sweden. She was one of the first members of Altrusa in Chicago, and appeared on Altrusa programs as a presenter. She was president of the Women's Music Club.

== Personal life ==
Ebba Sundstrom married Victor T. Nylander, a dentist who taught at the University of Illinois at Chicago from 1920 to 1937. They had a son, Reinhold Nylander, born in 1930. She was widowed when Victor died in 1962. Ebba Sundstrom Nylander died in 1963, aged 66 years.
