= Gena Branscombe =

American classical composer

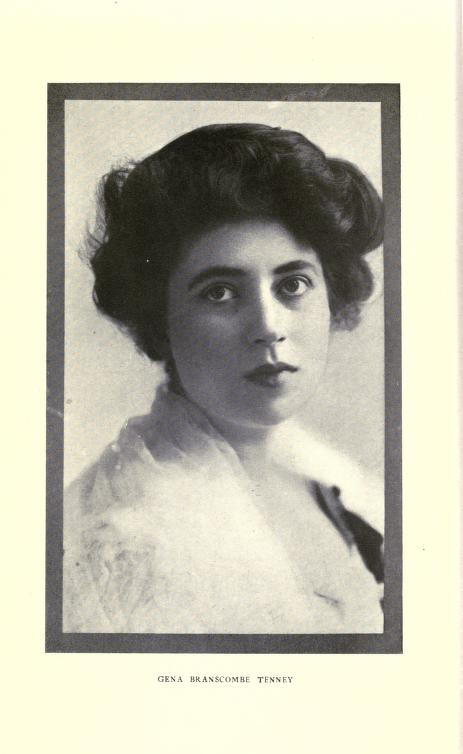
- Gena Branscombe
- Born: November 4, 1881; Picton, Ontario, Canada
- Died: June 26, 1977 (aged 95); New York City
- Other name: Gena Branscombe Tenney
- Occupations: Pianist, composer, music educator, and; choir conductor
- Employers: Chicago Musical College; (faculty); Whitman College; (Head of the piano department)
- Spouse: John Ferguson Tenney
- Children: 4
- Parents: Henry William Branscombe; Sara Elizabeth Allison Branscombe

Gena Branscombe (4 November 1881 – 26 July 1977) was a Canadian pianist, composer, music educator, and choir conductor who lived and worked in the United States.

== Early life and education ==
Gena Branscombe was born 4 November 1881 in Picton, Ontario. She began studying piano and harmony with local teachers, and her musical talent was apparent from an early age. She was also very skilled in improvisation and sight reading. Gena entered high school at age eleven and graduated at fifteen, and she decided to pursue a music degree in college.

Branscombe was accepted to the Chicago Musical College, and moving to the city with her mother in 1896, and studied there from 1897-1903. While enrolled at the institution, she received the Gold Medal in Composition in 1901 and 1902. During her degree, she studied piano with Florenz Ziegfeld, Arthur Friedheim, Hans von Schiller, and Rudolph Ganz, composition with Felix Borowski, and songwriting with Alexander von Fielitz. She remained in Chicago after graduating, where she was able to support herself financially through accompanying, teaching private piano lessons, and publishing her songs. She also joined the faculty of the Chicago Musical College.

== Career ==
=== Early career ===
Resigning her position at the Chicago Musical College in 1907, Branscombe became head of the piano department at Whitman College, Walla Walla, Washington. This move was prompted by a desire to advance her professional career, challenge her musical growth and earn better wages. There she met her future husband, John Ferguson Tenney. Upon the completion of two years of teaching at Whitman in 1909, she left the United States for one year of intensive piano and composition lessons in Berlin. She received an honorary Master of Arts degree from Whitman College in 1932.

=== 1909: Berlin ===
The renowned composer and teacher, Engelbert Humperdinck was her composition teaching during her year in Berlin. During her life, Branscombe spoke infrequently of her lessons with the master teacher. Before leaving Berlin to return home, Branscombe was the "guest of honor" at a "garden evening" given at the Humperdinck home in the early summer. She was one of only three or four women guests. Fifteen male students attended the event, at which an early quintet of Humperdinck's was performed and a Schumann quartet was played. Humperdinck and Branscombe's fellow students urged her to perform, but she declined. This party in her honor does indicate the esteem in which she must have been held.

During her year in Berlin, Branscombe and her fellow student, Belle Forbes, performed at a private dinner party given for president and Mrs. Theodore Roosevelt. She was featured in a Musical America magazine article, entitled "Women Composers of America". In addition, her works were included on a Women's Philharmonic Society of New York concert of American women composers which also included works by Mrs. H.H.A. Beach and Mary Turner Salter.

=== Choral music ===
After moving to New York in 1910, Branscombe studied choral conducting with Chalmers Clifton and Albert Stoessel, conductor of the Oratorio Society of New York.

Though Branscombe lived and worked for the majority of her life in the United States, she drew much inspiration from her Canadian heritage for her works. An opera based on the history of 17th-century French settlers in Canada, titled The Bells of Circumstance, was never completed, but provided compositional material for her orchestral work Quebec Suite, which was premiered in 1930 by the Chicago Women's Symphony Orchestra, conducted by Branscombe.

In 1944, Branscombe wrote Conventry's Choir for female voices and accompaniment in response to the bombing of Coventry Cathedral during World War II; the piece would go on to be performed in Coventry in 1962 and several times afterward in both Great Britain and the United States. Her hymn "Arms that Have Sheltered Us" (1960) was adopted by the Royal Canadian Navy, and her longevity as a composer can be seen in her composition Introit, Prayer Response, and Amen, written at the age of 92 and commisioned by Riverside Church in New York City.

=== Pilgrims of Destiny (1920) ===
In 1920, Branscombe completed her largest work, the oratorio Pilgrims of Destiny, based on the Mayflower pilgrims' arrival in November 1620. The National League of American Pen Women awarded this work their national Best Composition award in 1928. A gala performance took place in Plymouth, Massachusetts as part of National Federation of Music Clubs national convention. Due to the patriotic subject matter of her oratorio and the many awards presented to her, the Music Department of the Library of Congress in 1960 requested Branscombe's original orchestral score and orchestra parts for Pilgrims of Destiny.

The oratorio was a family effort with Branscombe writing the libretto with the help of her husband, John, who researched the passenger lists of those on board the ships sailing to America. He also served as proof reader. The couple worked as a team to see Pilgrims of Destiny to its completion and first performance.

=== In performance ===
Prominent opera and concert singers of the era performed her art songs on recital programs across the United States and in Europe. In 1908, Metropolitan Opera soprano Lillian Nordica performed Branscombe's "Hail Bounteous May" during a national recital tour. Many renowned recitalists of the period including David Bispham, Norman Jolliffe, Gladys Buckhout and George Hamlin performed her songs regularly. In 1947, internationally acclaimed soprano Mary Bothwell presented a recital at The Hague featuring Branscombe's songs. Classical trumpeter Edna White, the first person to present a solo trumpet recital at Carnegie Hall in New York City, performed Branscombe's "Procession" from her Quebec Suite.

Branscombe participated in several professional organizations outside the musical mainstream. She held national office for the General Federation of Women's Clubs, National League of American Pen Women, National Federation of Music Clubs, Society of American Women Composers, American Society of Composers, Authors and Publishers, and Altusa International.

Her extended involvement with the General Federation of Women's Clubs established Branscombe as a mentor and conductor. From 1930 to 1935 she was Chairman of American Music and Folksong Committee and a member of the executive board until 1945.

The Golden Jubilee Convention of the General Federation of Women's Clubs, held in 1941 in Atlantic City, New Jersey, featured a mass chorus of one thousand members from across the United States conducted by Gena Branscombe. Working over a year in advance, Branscombe created a concert program featuring works by herself, Mabel Daniels, Harriet Ware, Edgar Stillman Kelley, Mozart, Haydn and others. She detailed a list of instructions for the music's preparation and sent these to the conductors of the club choruses nationwide. In Atlantic City, with only one rehearsal of the combined one thousand, the concert was considered a stirring performance, with one thousand women from across the United States raising their voices to American music.

=== Conducting ===
In addition to composing, Branscombe was active as a conductor, often leading ensembles in premieres and performances of her own works. She founded her own women's chorus, the Branscombe Choral (1933-1954), which contained members from New Jersey, the New York City boroughs, and Connecticut. Membership consisted of women from all walks of life, from professionally trained musicians to amateurs who could not read music. Branscombe frequently composed and arranged many works for the choir as well as commissioned music by other women composers. Yearly concerts were given at Town Hall and the Broadway Tabernacle Church. The Choral performed at the first United Nations, on nationwide radio broadcasts, and sang Christmas carols for the commuters at Penn Station and Grand Central Station.

=== Publication ===
During Gena Branscombe's lifetime, 22 different music companies published 74 of her choral compositions, 150 art songs, 13 piano pieces and 8 instrumental works. Her publishers included Arthur P. Schmidt (promoter and publisher of American women composers), Wa Wan Press, Oliver Ditson of Boston, G. Schirmer Inc., Summy Birchard, HW Gray, J. Fisher, Hatch Music Company of Philadelphia, Whaley Royce and Company and Boosey-Hawkes.

== Personal life ==
Gena Branscombe was born Henry William Branscombe, a dentist, optometrist and druggist, and Sara Elizabeth Allison Branscombe, poet and newspaper woman. She had two older brothers; the first died in infancy and her second brother, Clarence Henry, was ten years her senior. She was of English, Scottish, Dutch, and Swedish descent, with part of her family coming from the village of Branscombe in Devonshire, England.

Gena Branscombe married John Ferguson Tenney of Methuen, Massachusetts. At the time of their meeting in December 1908 in Walla Walla, Washington, John was working as an attorney in Seattle. By spring 1909, they were engaged with the understanding that Gena would be leaving for one-year study in Berlin. They married in the Fall 1910 and moved to New York City where both would pursue their careers.

Branscombe and her husband had four daughters: Gena (b. 1911, d. 2007), Vivian (b.1913, d. 1990), Betty (b.1916, d. 1919 during the Spanish flu epidemic) and Beatrice (b.1919, d. 1954). Her husband, John, died in 1949. Branscombe composed until shortly before her death in New York City on 26 July 1977. After her death, her manuscripts were donated to the Music Division of The New York Public Library for the Performing Arts. She is noted as saying, "Having a home, a husband and children to love and serve brings enrichment of life to a woman. But being a part of the world's work in humbly serving and loving the illumined force which is music brings fulfillment."

== Selected works ==
References:

- The Bells of Circumstance, Unfinished opera, 1928
- Just in the Hush before the Dawn, 1946

=== Orchestral Music ===
- Ten (in Prologue) for orchestra
- Baladine for chamber orchestra, 1930
- Procession for orchestra, 1930.
- Elegie for orchestra, 1937
- Festival Prelude for orchestra, 1913
- Quebec Suite (excerpt from Bells of Circumstance) 1928

=== Solo Vocal Music ===
- Serenade (R. Browning), 1905
- Autumn Wind, 1911
- A Lute of Jade (Chin. poets), song cycle, 1911
- The Sun Dial: a Cycle of Love Songs of the Open Road (K. Banning), song cycle,1913
- I bring you heartsease, 1915
- 3 Unapproving Songs for Enthusiastic Children, 1922
- Hail ye tyme of holiedayes (Banning), 1924

=== Choral Music ===
- Dear Lad O'Mine (Hale) for female voices, orchestra, 1915
- Wreathe the holly, female voices, 1938
- Coventry's Choir, female voices, 1944
- Bridesmaid's Song, female voices, 1956
- A Joyfull Litany, female voices, 1967
- Youth of the World for female voices and chamber orchestra, 1932
- Spirit of Motherhood (Driscoll) for female voices, orchestra, 1923
- A Wind from the Sea (Longfellow) for female voices, orchestra, 1924
- The Dancer of Fjaard (Branscombe) for soli, female voices, orchestra, 1926
- The Phantom Caravan (Banning) for male voices, orchestra, 1925
- At the Postern Gate (Banning) for male voices, orchestra, 1918
- The Morning Wind (Banning) for female voices, orchestra, 1912
- Pilgrims of Destiny (Branscombe) for soli, SATB, orchestra, 1919

=== Chamber Music ===
- Concertstück, for Piano, 1906
- Sonata for Violin and Piano, 1920
- Carnival Fantasy, 1920
- A Lute of Jade, 1937
- Pacific Sketches, for Horn and Piano, 1956
- American Suite, for Horn and Piano, 1959
- Procession, for Trumpet and Piano, 1948

=== Publications ===
Branscombe wrote professional articles including:

- "The sound of trumpets," Showcase, vol 61, no. 3, 1962
