= Chippendale =

Chippendale may refer to:

== People ==
- Alfreda Chippendale (1842–1887), American actress
- George Chippendale (1921–2010), Australian botanist
- Chipps Chippendale, mountain bike magazine editor
- Thomas Chippendale (c. 1718–1779), English cabinetmaker, namesake of Chippendale furniture
- Thomas Chippendale, the younger (1749–1822), cabinetmaker, son of Thomas Chippendale
- William Chippendale (1730s–1802), English merchant
- William Henry Chippendale (1801–1888), English actor

== Others ==
- Chippendale, New South Wales, a Sydney suburb
- Chippendale Society, a British charity promoting furniture craftsmanship
- Chippendales, an American male dance troupe
- Chippendales Audition, a 1990 Saturday Night Live comedy sketch
- Chairface Chippendale, a supervillain character from the Tick comics
- Chinese Chippendale (architecture), an architectural detail derived from Thomas Chippendale's Chinese-influenced work

== See also ==
- Chippindale (disambiguation), variant spelling of the surname
- Chippindall (disambiguation), variant spelling of the surname
- Chip 'n' Dale, cartoon duo
  - Chip an' Dale, a 1947 short film starring Chip and Dale
