= Ditson Conductor's Award =

American music award honoring conductors

The Ditson Conductor's Award, established in 1945, is the oldest award honoring conductors for their commitment to the performance of American music. The US$5,000 purse is endowed by the Alice M. Ditson Fund at Columbia University, increased in 1999 from US$1,000.

The Ditson Conductor's Award was established five years after the 30 April 1940 death of Alice M. Ditson, widow of music publisher Charles Healy Ditson and daughter-in-law of Oliver Ditson, founder of the publishing house that bore his name. Her will bequested $400,000 (equivalent to $9.2 million in 2025) to Columbia University was for "the encouragement and aide of musicians". From this was born fellowships, public hearings, publication of the work of talented musicians and the Ditson Conductor's Award.

== Ditson Conductor's Award recipients ==
- 1945 Howard Hanson
- 1946 Léon Barzin
- 1947 Alfred Wallenstein
- 1948 Dean Dixon
- 1949 Thor Johnson
- 1950 Izler Solomon
- 1951 Robert Whitney
- 1952 Leopold Stokowski
- 1953 Walter Hendl
- 1954 David Broekman
- 1955 Robert Shaw
- 1956 Victor Alessandro
- 1957 Howard Mitchell
- 1958 Leonard Bernstein
- 1959 Julius Rudel
- 1960 Richard Bales
- 1961 Richard Franko Goldman
- 1962 Guy Fraser Harrison
- 1963 Milton Katims
- 1964 Emerson Buckley
- 1965 Jacob Avshalomov
- 1966 William Strickland
- 1967 Igor Buketoff
- 1968 Alan Carter
- 1969 Frederick Fennell
- 1970 Gunther Schuller
- 1971 Maurice Abravanel
- 1972 Louis Lane
- 1973 Stanisław Skrowaczewski
- 1974 Lukas Foss
- 1975 Antal Doráti
- 1976 José Serebrier
- 1977 Eugene Ormandy
- 1978 Gregg Smith
- 1979 Sergiu Comissiona
- 1980 James A. Dixon
- 1981 Michael Charry
- 1982 Russell Patterson
- 1983 Julius Hegyi
- 1984 Leonard Slatkin
- 1985 Jorge Mester
- 1986 Efrain Guigui
- 1987 Dennis Russell Davies
- 1988 Lawrence Leighton Smith
- 1989 Gerard Schwarz
- 1990 Mstislav Rostropovich
- 1991 Christopher Keene
- 1992 Herbert Blomstedt
- 1993 Michael Tilson Thomas
- 1994 Gerhard Samuel
- 1995 Gustav Meier
- 1996 James Bolle
- 1997 David Zinman
- 1998 JoAnn Falletta
- 1999 Christoph von Dohnányi
- 2000 James DePreist
- 2001 Joel Sachs
- 2002 Edwin London
- 2003 David Alan Miller
- 2004 Donald Portnoy
- 2005 David Hoose
- 2006 David Robertson
- 2007 Gil Rose
- 2008 Robert Spano
- 2009 James Levine
- 2010 Osmo Vänskä
- 2011 Alan Gilbert
- 2012 George Manahan
- 2013 Jeffrey Milarsky
- 2014 Harold Rosenbaum
- 2015 John Mauceri
- 2016 Cliff Colnot
- 2017 Marin Alsop
- 2018 Oliver Knussen
- 2019 Bradley Lubman
- 2020 Steven Schick
- 2021 John Adams
- 2022 Delta David Gier
- 2023 James Baker
- 2024 Vimbayi Kaziboni
- 2025 Tim Weiss
- 2026 Emily Freeman Brown
