= Louis P. Goullaud =

19th-century music publisher

Louis Pierre Goullaud (23 November 1840 – 7 December 1919) published and sold music in Boston, Massachusetts, in the 19th century. In the 1860s he worked for "Koppitz, Pruefer & Co." With Asa Warren White (1826–1894) and his son, Edward Warren White (1849–1896) – as the firm "White & Goullaud" – he sold musical instruments and published sheet music (c. 1869 – 1875). Under his own imprint he issued sheet music and Goullaud's Monthly Journal of Music. He retired c. 1886, and died in Braintree on December 7, 1919.

== Published by Goullaud ==
- Little Rosewood Casket. 1870
- The Dundreary Polka. Composed and inscribed to Mr. Sothern by Thomas Baker. 1872
- Inman Line March. Composed by A.E. Warren. Respectfully Inscribed to William Inman Esq. 1872
- The Little Frauds, Harrigan & Hart's Songs & Sketches. 1872
- Thematic Catalogue of Popular Songs. 1872
- Gentle Spring Waltz dedicated to Fanny Davenport. 1873
- Lotta's Favorite Nocturne for piano by J. W. Turner. 1873
- Johnny You're In Luck, Sung With Unbounded Success By "Bryants Minstrels." 1874
- The Shaughraun Waltz by Thomas Baker. 1875
- Fifth Avenue George, a Popular Song. Sung with unbounded applause by Tony Pastor. Written & Composed by J. P. Skelly. 1876
- George H. Coes's Album of Music. 1876
- Evangeline, Opera Bouffe. List of Original Music. Libretto by J. Cheever Goodwin. Music by Edward E. Rice. 1877
- Songs of the Rice Surprise Party. 1880

== Images ==
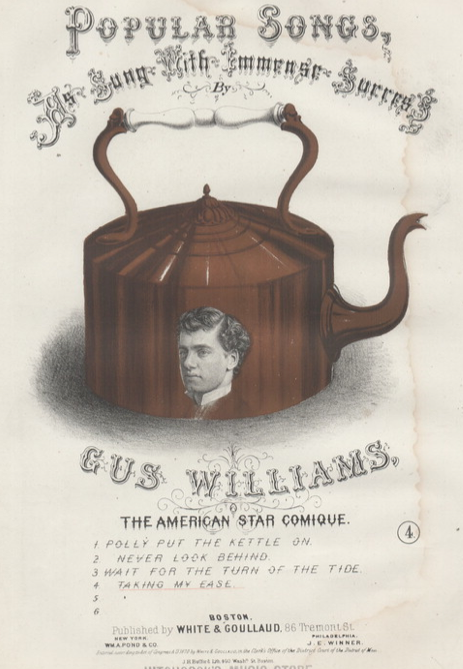
Taking My Ease by Gus Williams, 1870 (Library of Congress)

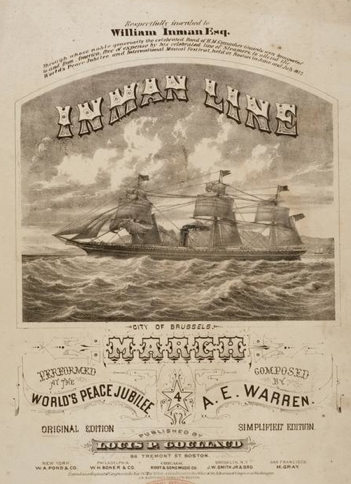
Inman Line March by A.E. Warren, performed at the World's Peace Jubilee and International Musical Festival, 1872

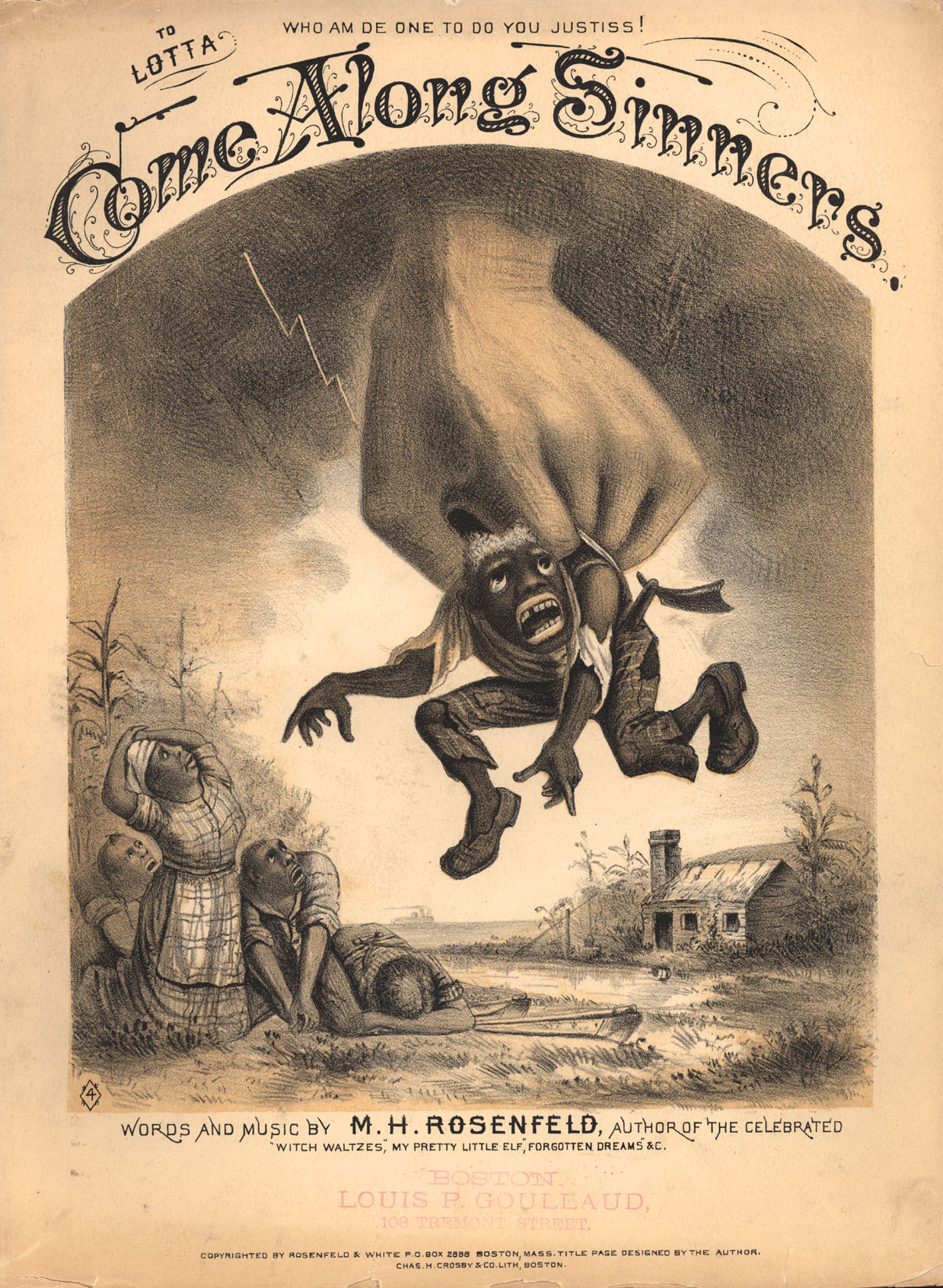
Come Along Sinners, by Monroe H. Rosenfeld (Library of Congress)

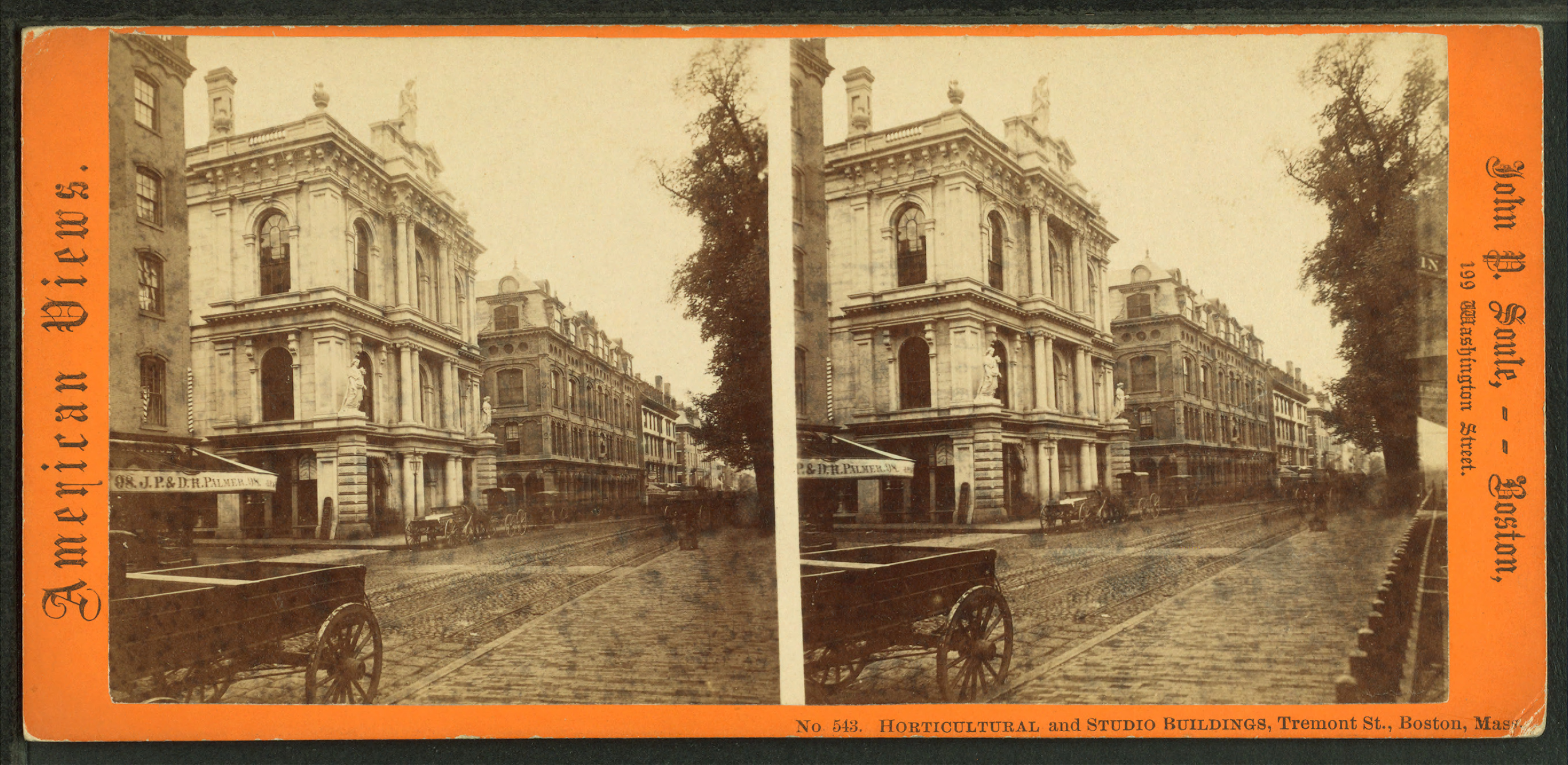
Tremont Street, Boston, ca. 1870s–1880s, in vicinity of Goullard's business address

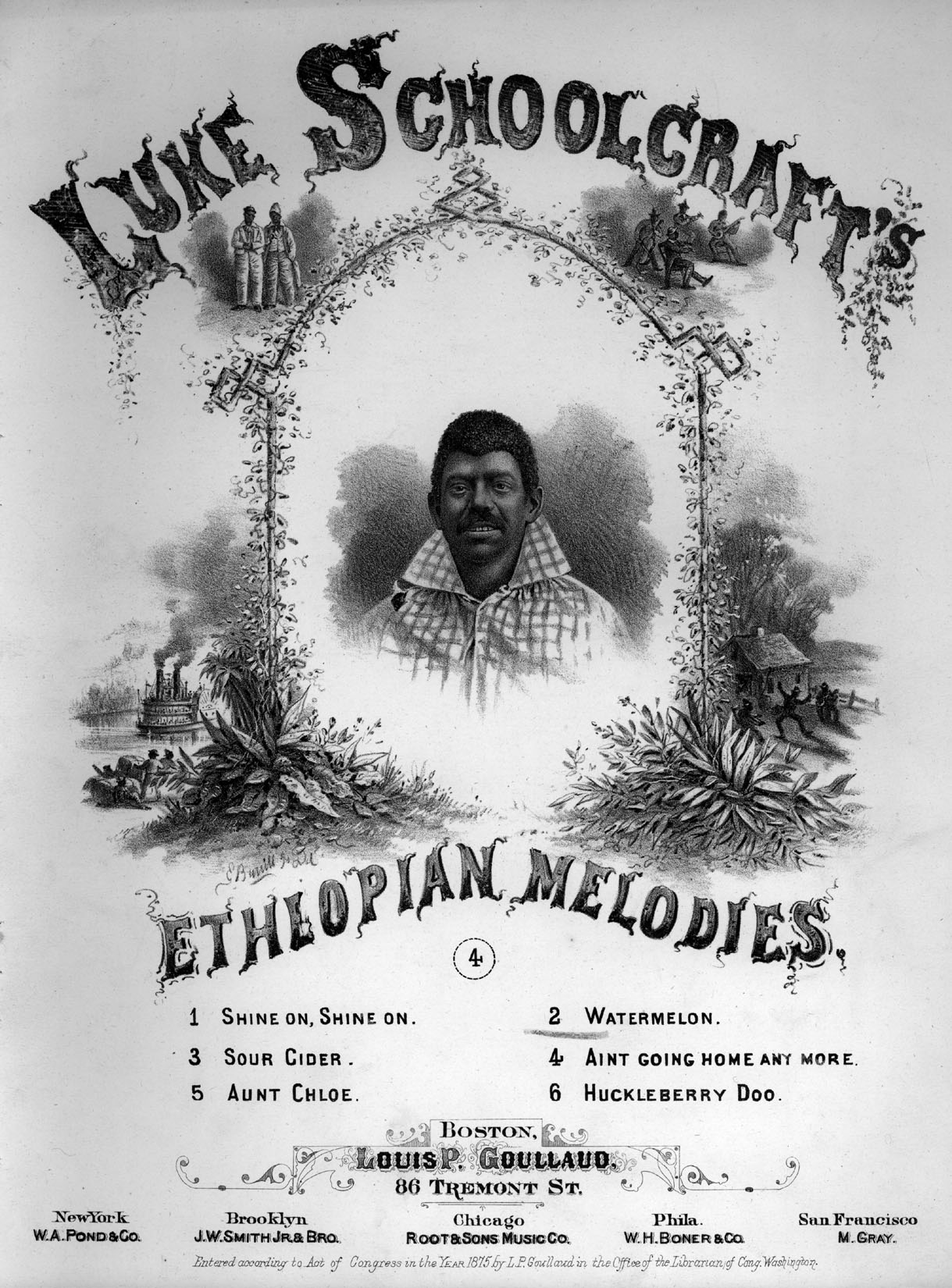
Luke Schoolcraft's Ethiopian Melodies (Library of Congress)

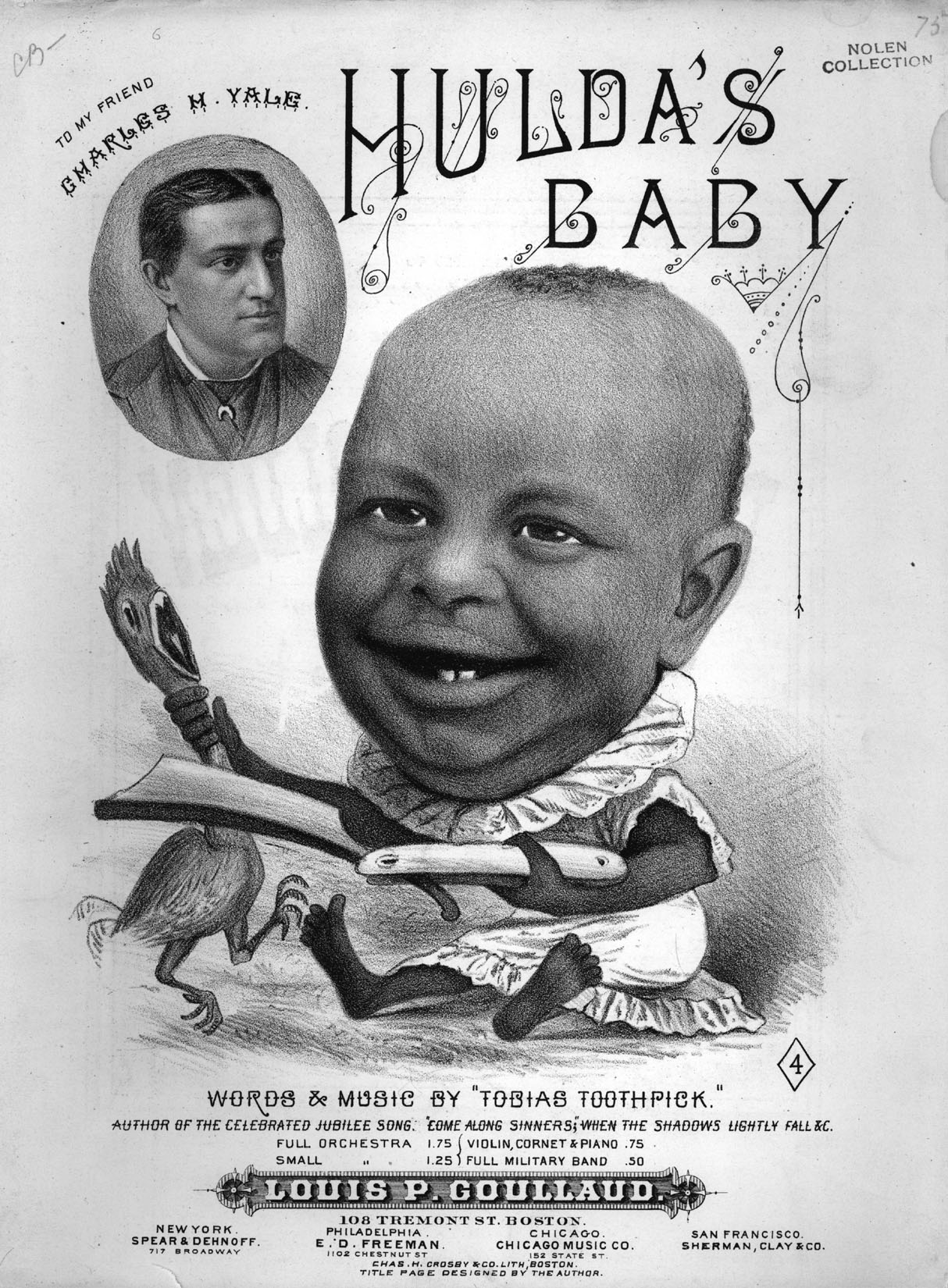
Hulda's Baby by M.H. Rosenfeld, 1881 (Library of Congress). Depicts portrait of Charles H. Yale
