= Alice M. Ditson Fund =

American music foundation

The Alice M. Ditson Fund, founded in 1940, supports contemporary American music. Significant ongoing awards include the Ditson Conductor's Award.

== Overview ==
In its early years, the fund supported notable 20th-century musicians such as Bela Bartok, Benjamin Britten, Aaron Copland, Gian Carlo Menotti, Virgil Thomson, and Walter Piston. From 1945 to 1952, the Fund sponsored the week-long Columbia Festival of Contemporary American Music. The Ditson Fund was also active in supporting the Composers' Forum concerts in New York. A 1946 opera composition contest co-sponsored with the Metropolitan Opera ("the Met") was won by the opera The Warrior by composer Bernard Rogers and librettist Norman Corwin which let to a staging of that work at the Met in 1947.

The fund's namesake, Alice Ditson, was the wife of music publisher Charles Healy Ditson and daughter-in-law of Oliver Ditson, founder of the publishing house that bore his name. She was a supporter of American classical music during her lifetime, and her will bequested $400,000 (equivalent to $9.2 million in 2025) to Columbia University for "the encouragement and aide of musicians."
