= America's Crusaders =

Song
- Language: English
- Written: 1918
- Published: 1918
- Songwriter: Charles Fonteyn Manning

"America's Crusaders" is a World War I song composed by Charles Fonteyn Manney. It was copyrighted on August 16, 1918, and was published by Oliver Ditson and Company in Boston in two forms: for four-part ensemble of mixed voices and for a four-part ensemble of male voices, with baritone soloist.

== History ==
Manney was a well-known Boston composer and choir director who also worked as a music editor for Oliver Ditson and Company. For its 1918 Fourth of July concert, the Boston Pops Orchestra asked Stephen Townsend to lead three sets of songs to be sung by a male chorus, and Townsend evidently requested or commissioned Manney to produce a commemorative work. The work is in a cultivated style, with words and rhythm evoking a heroic slow march and textures suitable for upper-class church anthems. As befits Manney's professional standing and experience, it is harmonically sophisticated, though not at all innovative.

Although copyrighted in August, “America’s Crusaders” was not published until November, as the War neared its end. Though written to support the troops (the lyric opens with "As we go to battle, Motherland, for thee"), it was marketed as a patriotic anthem for general use. Ditson made only a modest effort to promote it, but over the next decade it received several performances by amateur ensembles ranging from church groups to civic organizations to high school ensembles. In the mid-1920s it receded from view, but it was retained in Ditson's catalogue, and Manney renewed the copyright in 1946. Its greatest impact, however, came three years later, when it was sung, in part, at the start and finish of the celebrated television documentary Crusade in Europe.
