= William Stuckenholz =

19th century German American composer

"Inflation Galop" pdf

William Stuckenholz (c. 1840, Germany – died July 18, 1884, New Orleans) was a German born American composer, pianist, and music teacher. His songs include galops, polka, schottisches, valses, and quadrilles. Many of his works were published by the San Francisco music publisher Matthias Gray. He also had songs published by Boston music publishers White & Goullaud and the Oliver Ditson and Company. Many of his published works are held in the collection of the Library of Congress, and in university libraries.

== Life and career ==
Born in c. 1840, Stuckenholz immigrated from Germany to the United States, where by 1875 he had settled in Lancaster, Pennsylvania and was operating a store which sold sheet music and musical instruments. By August 1876 he had moved to Sacramento, California where he worked as a pianist and teacher of piano and singing. By 1880 at the latest, he had moved to San Francisco where he continued to work as a music teacher. He had previously conducted performances of Julius Eichberg's The Doctor of Alcantara in San Francisco at the theatre inside Saint Ann's Building (known as Saint Ann's Rest) at the corner of Eddy and Powell Streets in 1879.

The Harmonie Maennerchor (founded 1874), a well known choir and singing society in Reading, Pennsylvania, programmed Stuckenholz's waltz "Blumenstrauss" in 1880. The Eighth Army United States Infantry Band programed Stuckenholz's waltz, "The Dance of Death", for a concert at the Pavilion of the State Agricultural Society in Sacramento, California in 1881. The band of the University of California, Berkeley performed his schottische "Cassandra" at the university's commencement ceremony in 1883 while diplomas were being dispensed. His waltz "The Billets Doux" was performed in concerts in Oakland, California by the Columbia Orchestra in 1895.

In 1884 Stuckenholz left San Francisco for New Orleans where he worked as pianist in clubs and on Poydras Street and in the French Quarter. He was drinking heavily during his time in New Orleans and was experiencing financial problems. He was found dead by his landlord in his room at 217 Poydras Street on July 18, 1884 after complaining of feeling sick the night previously and spending much of the night drinking large amounts of water. He was buried in New Orleans with a marked grave at the direction of city officials. His obituary in The New York Times described him as physically "a very large man with a big head".

== Partial list of compositions ==
- "The Panic Galop" (1870, Frederick Blume)
- "Inflation Galop!" (1874, White & Goullaud)
- "Republic Life Galop" (1874, Oliver Ditson and Company)
- "The Dance of Death: Valse Characteristique" (1877, Wm. A Frey)
- "Evangeline : polka mazurka" (c. 1878, M. Gray)
- "California March" (1878, M. Gray)
- "La Belle Brunette", galop (1878, C.H. Ditson)
- "Reminiscence of the Cliff House", a polka (1879, Oliver Distson & Company)
- "Blumen-Strauss Waltz" (1879, Wm A. Frey)
- "Les Ojos Azules" (English: "Blue Eyes") (1881, Oliver Ditson & Company); Quadrille"
- "Cassandra" (1882, M. Gray)
- "The Billets Doux" (1882, M. Gray)
- "Tamora, five-step Polka" (1883, M. Gray)
- "I Can Not Sing the Old Songs" (1889, published posthumously by L. Budd Rosenberg)
