= Mary Jane Seaman =

Mary J. Chippendale
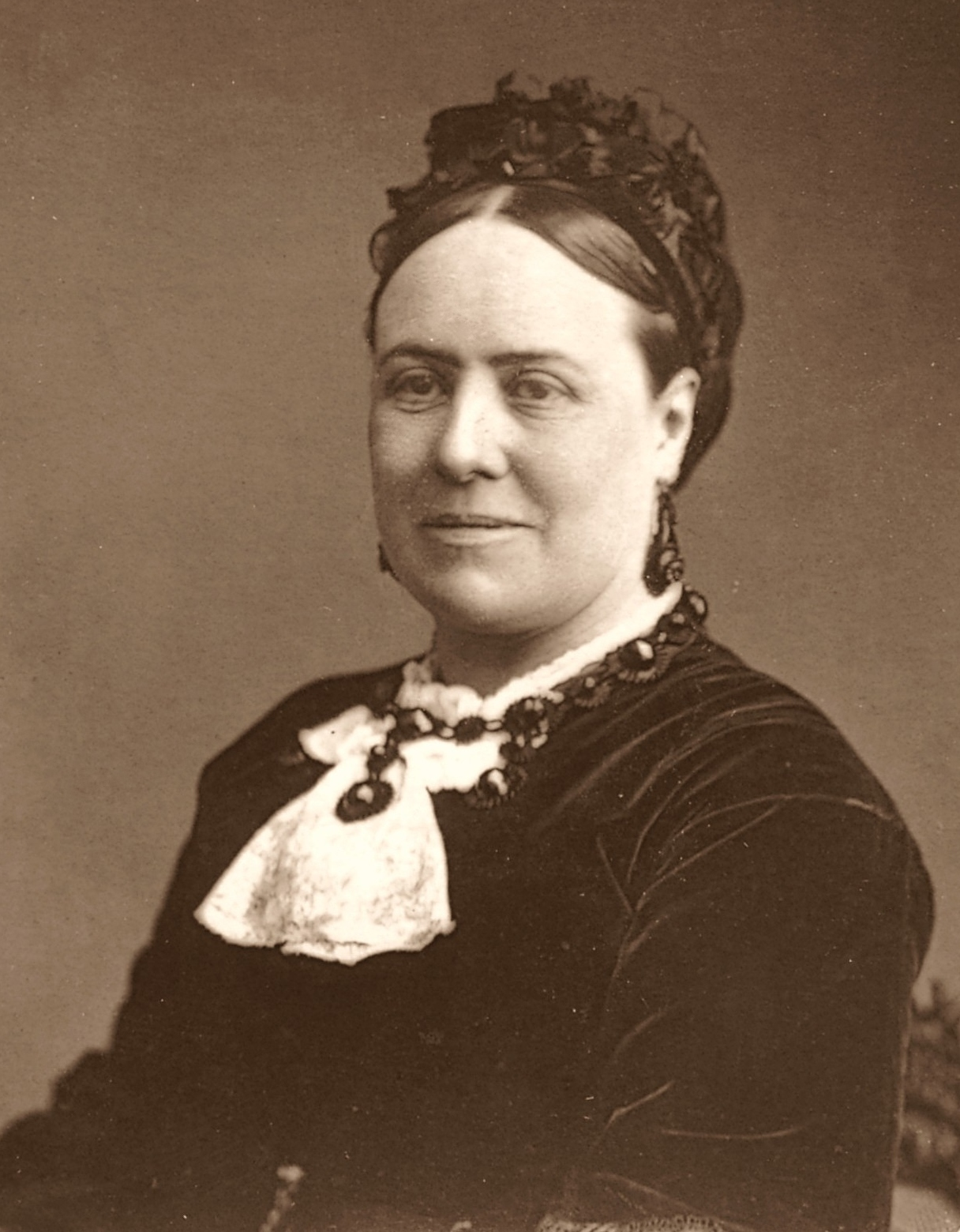
- Mary Jane Seaman
- Born: Mary Jane Seaman; 1837
- Died: May 26, 1888
- Occupation: Actress

Mary Jane Seaman, married name Mrs. Chippendale (1837?, Salisbury – 26 May 1888, Camberwell) was an English actress.

== Life ==
Mary Jane Seaman was an actress who played in the provinces before playing Mrs Wellington de Boots in Joseph Stirling Coyne's comedy Everybody's Friend at the Theatre Royal, Manchester in October 1859. Under the name Miss Snowdon she made her first London appearance playing Mrs Malaprop in The Rivals at the Haymarket Theatre in 1863. In 1866 she married her fellow Haymarket actor William Henry Chippendale. She was at the Court Theatre in 1875, and at the Lyceum Theatre in 1878. She took a company to Australia, on her return succeeded Mrs Stirling as Martha in Faust at the Lyceum, and accompanied Henry Irving to the United States.

She died on 26 May 1888 at Peckham Road, Camberwell, and was buried in St Pancras and Islington Cemetery. Attractive and buxom, she won acceptance as Dowager Lady Duberly in George Colman's The Heir at Law, Mrs Candour in Sheridan's The School for Scandal, and Mrs. Hardcastle in Goldsmith's She Stoops to Conquer.
