= Palace Theatre (Albany, New York) =

Venue in New York, United States

Coordinates: 42°39′16″N 73°45′02″W

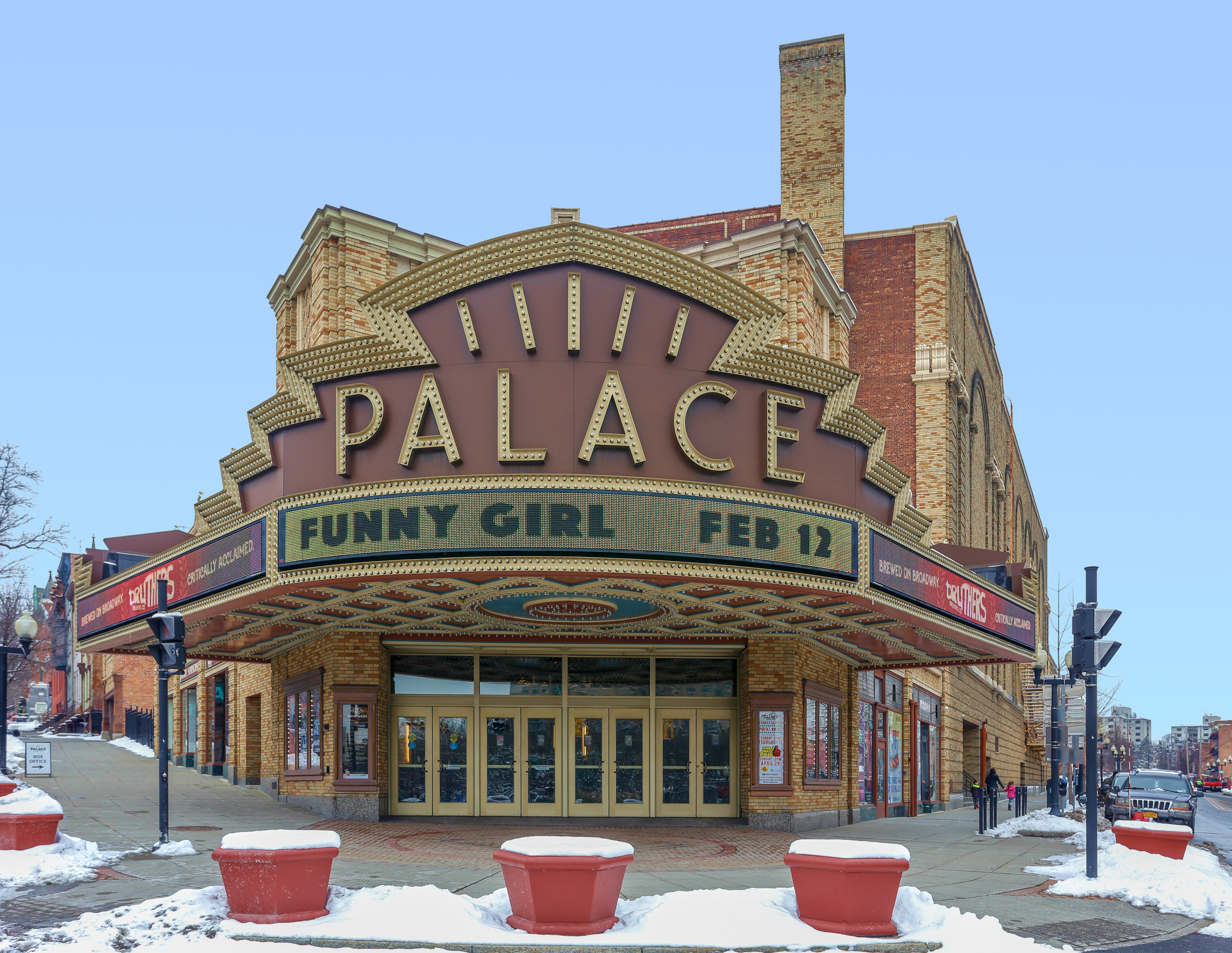
- Marquee of the venue (c.2018)
- Interactive map of Palace Theatre
- Address: 19 Clinton Avenue; Albany, New York 12207-2211
- Owner: City of Albany
- Operator: Palace Performing Arts Center, Inc.
- Capacity: 2,844

Construction
- Groundbreaking: June 1930
- Opened: October 23, 1931
- Renovated: 1960; 2002–2003

Website
- Venue Website
- Palace Theatre
- U.S. National Register of Historic Places
- Built: 1931
- Architect: John Eberson
- Architectural style: Art Deco
- NRHP reference No.: 79003235
- Added to NRHP: October 4, 1979

The Palace Theatre is an entertainment venue in downtown Albany, New York, located on the corner of Clinton Avenue (US 9) and North Pearl Street (NY 32). The theatre is operated by the Palace Performing Arts Center, Inc., a 501(c)(3) non-profit organization. Established in 1984 and incorporated as a not-for-profit corporation in 1989, the Palace Performing Arts Center, Inc. was created to operate the theatre and utilize its full potential as a cultural and entertainment center in Albany.

The venue hosts over 150 events annually, including concerts, dance performances, musicals, educational programs, live comedy, movie screetings, and even private events such as weddings, dance competitions, corporate events, and graduations. The Albany Symphony Orchestra regularly performs at the venue, other notable music artists have included the Rolling Stones, Jerry Seinfeld, Bruce Springsteen, Roy Orbison, Tony Bennett, Frank Zappa, Melissa Etheridge, and Ringo Starr.

Designed by John Eberson, one of the world's foremost theatre architect of the time and well noted for his atmospheric theatre designs. The Radio Keith Orpheum (RKO) owned facility spared no expense in its design and boasted an ornate Austrian Baroque design with "atmospheric" elements in the auditorium. Though many changes have taken place since its opening, the Palace has retained most of its original design features, including an impressive brass chandelier in the main lobby, original murals painted by Hungarian artists Andrew Karoly and Louis Szanto and plaster beams in the fore-lobby painted to resemble carved wood. In 1979 it was listed on the National Register of Historic Places. Nine years later it was declared a contributing property to the Clinton Avenue Historic District.

== History ==
75th anniversary logo

The Palace Theatre was originally built as an RKO movie palace. Construction took place from June 1930 to October 1931, when it opened it was Albany's largest movie theatre. It featured an "Sp 4m" Wurlitzer theatre organ, opus #1538.

In 1940, The Palace was sold to FAST Theatres, part of Fabian Enterprises, when RKO exited the theatre business due to antitrust concerns. The theatre underwent a $250,000 renovation in 1960, seating capacity was reduced to allow for more comfortable seating. The Palace closed in September 1969, as it had become unprofitable. Soon after its closure, the building was purchased by the City of Albany for $90,000 and reopened. During the first few years of the city's ownership, a new boiler and roof were installed, the limit of its renovations for decades. It was added to the National Register of Historic Places on October 4, 1979.

In 2002, an extensive restoration project began at a cost of $3 million. Completed in January 2003 the project restored the look and feel of the interior of the theatre closer to its original historic design and included the addition of a new LED marquee, replicating the original 1931 design. Work was carried out by Conrad Schmitt Studios of New Berlin, WI. The local firm of Einhorn Yaffee Prescott were the architects for the project.

== Building ==
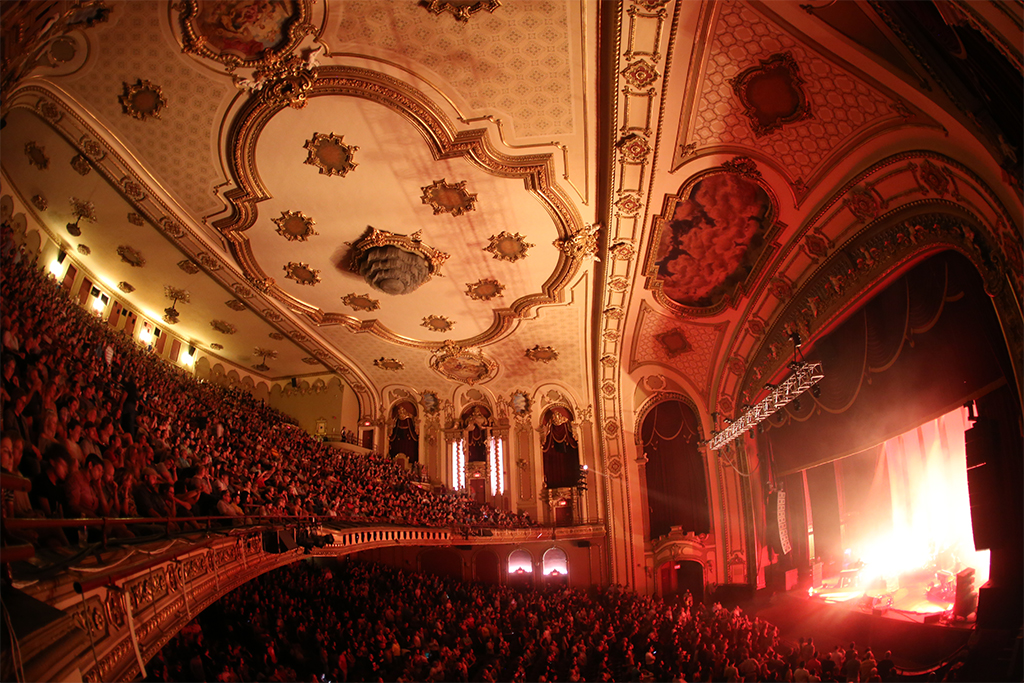
Interior during a sold-out performance.

The theatre is on a small lot at the northwest corner of the intersection, just north of downtown. It is a brick and stone steel frame building in two sections.

The front two stories, facing the corner and including the marquee with a modern scrolling LED display, are faced in tan brick with some stone ornamentation. The windows have carved brackets. There are open pediments with cartouches and brick parapets with molded stone coping.

The taller auditorium, to the northwest, features a banded chimney and decorative brickwork facing the south. The east elevation, along Pearl, has circular arcading and banded pilasters.

The interior is designed and decorated in the Austrian Baroque style. The foyer, between the lobby and main entrance, has red marble staircases decorated in scrollwork, cartouches, and garlands. The wrought iron railing is foliated. Murals by two Hungarian artists decorate the walls.

The balcony level extends over two-thirds of the sloping main floor. The heavily decorated ceilings and walls include pilasters rising to complex entablatures, statuary, and arches framing the wall boxes. A Czech made crystal chandelier hangs from the ceiling. The orchestra pit can be raised and lowered by an elevator.

== See also ==
- Albany Symphony Orchestra
- David Alan Miller
