= Gertrude Ina Robinson =

American harpist, composer, and writer

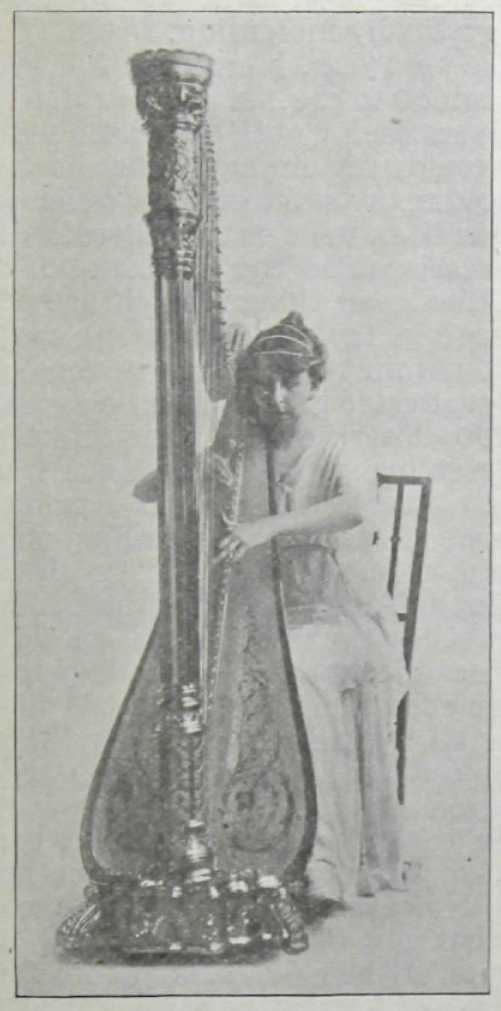
- Robinson in 1917
- Born: 1868; Waterloo, Iowa, U.S.
- Died: 7 September 1950 (aged 81–82)
- Occupations: composer writer musician realtor

Gertrude Ina Robinson (1868 – 7 September 1950) was an American author, composer, and harpist.

== Biography ==
Robinson was the oldest of four children born in Waterloo, Iowa, to Mary Frances Jackson and Robert Harvey Robinson. Her father was a shoe and boot dealer; her mother owned a zinc and lead mine. Robinson studied piano as a child. Her harp teachers were Alphonse Hasselmans, Edmond Schuecker and Enrico Tramonti.

By 1910, Robinson was living in New York City. She gave harp lessons and served as the harpist at Madison Square Presbyterian Church, a position she held for many years. She belonged to the Authors League of America, the Mozart Club, and Daughters of the American Revolution.

In addition to writing books, poems, and at least one article, Robinson designed gift tags produced by Dennison Manufacturing Co. These items are archived at the Library of Congress Rare Book and Special Collections Division. By 1930, Robinson had moved to Nassau, New York, where in 1940 she was employed in real estate.

Robinson’s books were published by Floral Fairies Publishing, located at her home address. Her music was published by Carl Fischer Music, International Music Company, and Oliver Ditson. Her poems were published in The Open Road: Official Organ of the Society of the Universal Brotherhood of Man, vol 7 1911.

== Published works ==
=== Articles ===
- The Harp in the Orchestra (The Crescendo vol 9, no 8 Feb 1917 p 9)

=== Books ===
- Floral Fairies Series: The Little Miss Hollys
- Floral Fairies Series: The Mistletoes’ Pranks (illustrated by F. A. Carter)

=== Harp ===
- 10 Classics for Harp and Organ
- 20 Advanced Melodic & Progressive Etudes for Harp
- 20 Melodic & Progressive Etudes for Harp
- Advanced Lessons for the Harp: Comprising Preludes in Minor Keys, Glissandos and Solos in Characteristic Forms for Harp According to the Famous Hasselmans Method
- Duos for Violin and Small Irish Harp
- Excerpts and Solos for Small Harp
- Fairies Dream
- Groves of Blarney
- Original Compositions and Adaptations for the Harp

=== Poems ===
- Gate of LIfe
- Sunshine and Rain

=== Vocal ===
- Shepherds Watch Thy Rest at NIght (mixed voices; text by Gertrude Ina Robinson; melody by Howard Elmore Parkhurst)
- Download free public domain sheet music for harp by Gertrude Ina Robinson
