= Geoffrey Simon =

Australian conductor resident in London (born 1946)

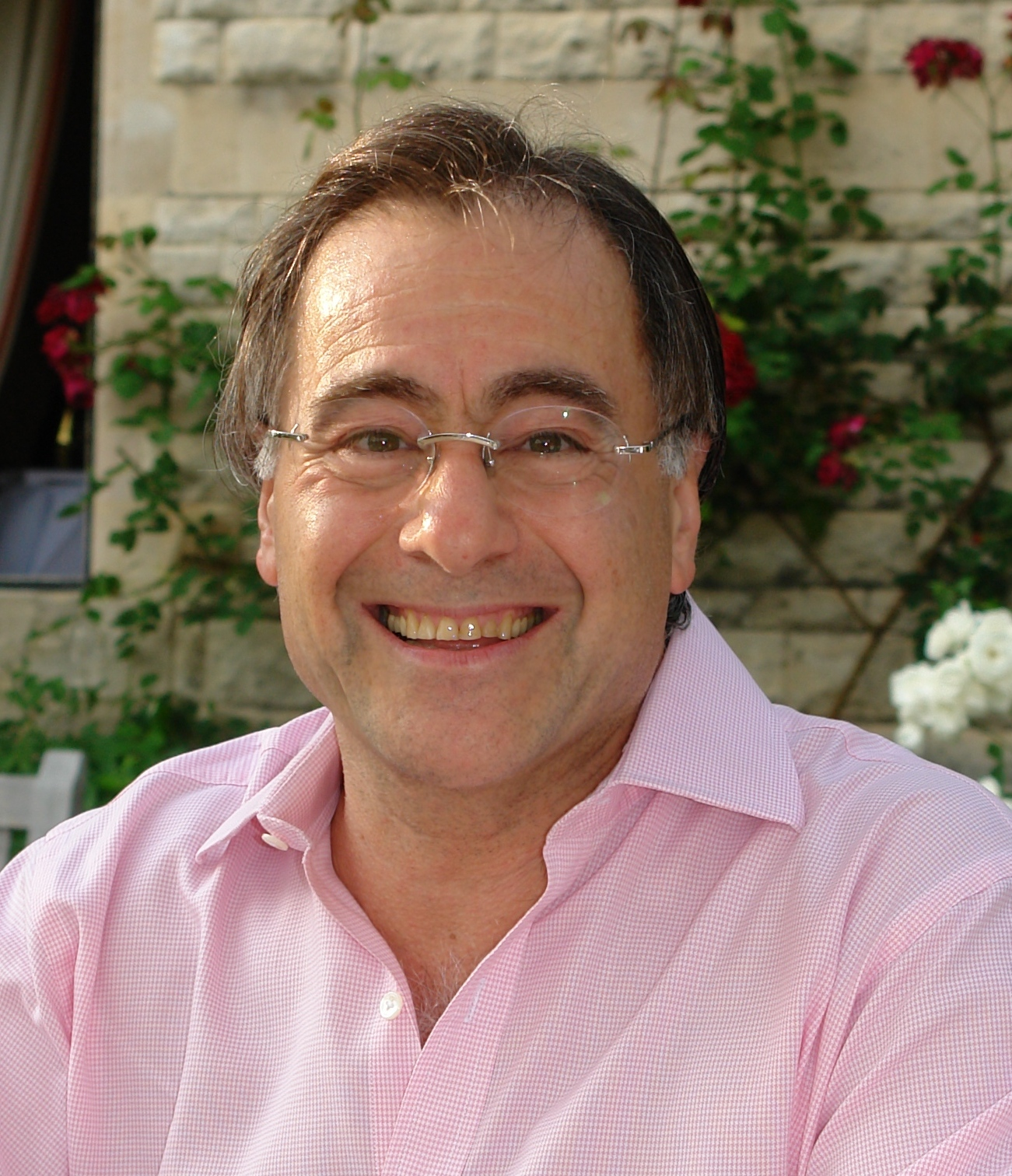
Simon c. 2000

Geoffrey Philip Simon (born 3 July 1946) is an Australian conductor resident in London.

== Recordings ==
Geoffrey Simon was born in Adelaide. He was a student of Herbert von Karajan, Rudolf Kempe, Hans Swarowsky and Igor Markevitch, and a major prize-winner at the first John Player International Conductors' Award. He has made 45 recordings for a number of labels, combining familiar works with world premieres of rediscovered obscure works by Tchaikovsky, Respighi, Borodin, Mussorgsky, Smetana, Grainger, Debussy, Ravel, Saint-Saëns and Les Six.

For his own label, Cala Records, Geoffrey Simon has a series of records where he has brought together ensembles of single instruments—all violins, violas, cellos, double basses, horns, trumpets, trombones and harps—drawn from London's leading solo and orchestral musicians. The recordings have attracted interest among instrumentalists, composers and audiences worldwide.

== Appearances ==
He has appeared in London with the London Philharmonic Orchestra, London Symphony Orchestra, Philharmonia Orchestra, Royal Philharmonic Orchestra, London Chamber Orchestra and English Chamber Orchestra.

Internationally, he has appeared with the American, Atlanta, City of Birmingham, Bournemouth, Fort Worth, Milwaukee, St Louis, Sapporo, Shanghai and Tokyo Metropolitan symphonies, the Israel, Moscow, Munich and New Japan Philharmonics, the Residentie Orchestra of The Hague, the six major Australian orchestras and Opera Australia.

== Music directorships ==
His music directorships have included the Albany Symphony Orchestra (New York), the Sacramento Symphony (California) and the Orquestra Simfònica de Balears "Ciutat de Palma" (Mallorca).

Previously he was professor of music and conductor of the University of North Texas College of Music Symphony Orchestra in Denton, Texas.

He has conducted a Mahler cycle as music director of the Northwest Mahler Festival in Seattle. He is classical special projects consultant of Arts Global (London, New York and Montreux) and a jury member for Young Concert Artists (Paris, Leipzig and New York) and the Australian Music Foundation (London).

== Awards and nominations ==
=== ARIA Music Awards ===
The ARIA Music Awards is an annual awards ceremony held by the Australian Recording Industry Association. They commenced in 1987.

Year	Nominee / work	Award	Result	Ref.
1991	Percy Grainger: Orchestral Works (with Melbourne Symphony Orchestra)	Best Classical Album	Nominated	
