= John C. Haynes & Co. =

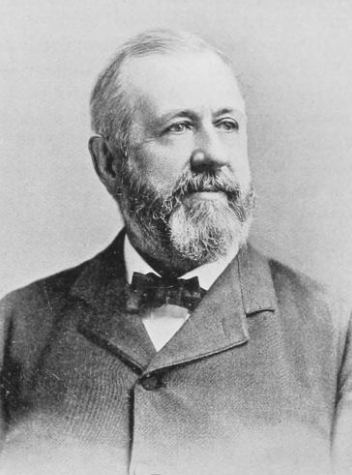
John C. Haynes (1829–1907)

John C. Haynes & Co. was a significant American maker of a wide variety of musical instruments in the late 19th century. The company manufactured guitars sold under the Bay State, William B. Tilton, and Haynes Excelsior brand names. The company was set up by Oliver Ditson in 1865, and ceased guitar making operations around 1900, selling its facilities to the Vega Company.

By early in the 20th century, the company was no longer making instruments; it had become a retail store selling pianos, and instruments under the Ditson name.

John C. Haynes died at his home in Boston on May 3, 1907.
