= Albany Symphony Orchestra =

Professional symphony orchestra based in Albany, New York

- Orchestra
- Former name: People's Orchestra of Albany
- Founded: 1930; 96 years ago
- Location: Albany and Troy, and Schenectady, United States
- Concert hall: Palace Theatre, Troy Savings Bank Music Hall, Experimental Media and Performing Arts Center, Proctor's Theatre
- Principal conductor: David Alan Miller
- Website: www.albanysymphony.com

The Albany Symphony Orchestra is a professional symphony orchestra based in Albany, New York.

Founded in 1930 as the People's Orchestra of Albany by Italian-born conductor John Carabella, the Albany Symphony is the oldest professional symphony orchestra based in New York's Capital District. The orchestra annually performs at venues such as the Palace Theatre in Albany and the Troy Savings Bank Music Hall in Troy, NY.

David Alan Miller has served as music director and conductor of the orchestra since 1992. Former music directors have included John Carabella, Rudolf Thomas, Ole Windingstad, Edgar Curtis, Julius Hegyi, and Geoffrey Simon.

Since the 1980s, the Albany Symphony has released more than 20 CDs, encompassing nearly 60 works, for New World Records, CRI Records, Albany Records, Argo, Naxos, and London/Decca. The orchestra won a Grammy Award in 2014 and in 2021 and was nominated for an award in 2020.

The Albany Symphony is unique in its mission statement to perform new works by modern composers, thereby exposing audiences to a new generation of orchestral music.

== History ==
Founded in 1930 as the People's Orchestra of Albany by Italian-born conductor John Carabella, the Albany Symphony is the oldest professional symphony orchestra based in New York's Capital District.

The Albany Symphony celebrated its 75th anniversary during the 2005/2006 season, which included solo appearances by cellist Yo-Yo Ma, bassist Edgar Meyer, violinist Yura Lee, baritone Nathan Myers, violinist Colin Jacobsen, pianist Joel Fan, violinist Jonathan Gandelsman, clarinetist Susan Martula, pianist Findlay Cockrell, percussionist Colin Currie, flutist Paolo Bortolussi, pianist Yefim Bronfman, violinist Nadja Salerno-Sonnenberg, and Frederic Lacroix. Also during the season, the Albany Symphony presented several world premiere performances of commissioned works by composers such as Stephen Dankner, Michael Woods, Bun Ching Lam, Carolyn Yarnell, and Michael Torke.

The Albany Symphony has performed with a wide variety of guest artists, including violinist Joshua Bell who was featured during the orchestra's 77th season in a concert that included Mendelssohn's Violin Concerto and selections from West Side Story.

== Music Directors ==
- John Carabella (1930–1938)
- Rudolph Thomas (1939–1944)
- Ole Windingstad (1945–1947)
- Edgar Curtis (1948–1954)
- Julius Hegyi (1965–1988)
- Geoffrey Simon (1987–1991)
- George Lloyd (1990–1991)
- David Alan Miller (1992–present)

== Discography ==
- Peter Mennin. Albany Records 260

Peter Mennin: Concertato, "Moby Dick"
Peter Mennin: Symphony No. 5
Peter Mennin: Fantasia for String Orchestra
Peter Mennin: Symphony No. 6

- Morton Gould. Albany Records 300

Morton Gould: Show Piece for Orchestra
Morton Gould: Piano Concerto (Randall Hodgkinson, piano)
Morton Gould: StringMusic

- The Great American Ninth. Albany Records 350

Roy Harris: Memories of a Child's Sunday
Roy Harris: Symphony No. 9
Roy Harris: Symphony No. 8 (Alan Feinberg, piano)

- Brutal Reality. Albany Records 354

Richard Adams: Brutal Reality
Arthur Bloom: Life is Like a Box of Chocolates
Evan Chambers: Concerto for Fiddle, Violin and Orchestra (Jill Levy, violin;
Nollaig Casey, fiddle)
John Fitz Rogers: Verge
Kamran Ince: Fest for Chamber Ensemble and Orchestra

- John Harbison. Albany Records 390

John Harbison: The Most Often Used Chords
John Harbison: Symphony No. 3
John Harbison: Flute Concerto (Randolph Bowman, flute)

- Don Gillis. Albany Records 391

Don Gillis: Symphony "x" (The Big D)
Don Gillis: Shindig
Don Gillis: Encore Concerto (Alan Feinberg, piano)
Don Gillis: Symphony No. 5 - 1/2

- Benjamin Lees. Albany Records 441

Andrew Bishop: Crooning
Allen Shawn: Piano Concerto (Ursula Oppens, piano)
Paul Creston: Dance Overture
Benjamin Lees: Piano Concerto No. 2 (Ian Hobson, piano)

- George Lloyd. Albany Reocords 458

George Lloyd: Cello Concerto (Anthony Ross, cello)
George Lloyd: Orchestral Suite No. 1 from "The Serf"

- Gould & Harris. Albany Records 515

Roy Harris: Symphony No. 2
Morton Gould: Symphony No. 3

- William Schuman. Albany Records 566

William Schuman: Credendum
William Schuman: Concerto for Piano and Orchestra (John McCabe, piano)
William Schuman: Symphony No. 4

- Lopatnikoff, Helps, Thomson & Kurka. Albany Records 591

Nikolai Lopatnikoff: Festival Overture
Robert Helps: Concerto No. 2 for Piano & Orchestra (Alan Feinberg, piano)
Virgil Thomson: Filling Station (complete ballet)
Robert Kurka: Symphony No. 2, Op. 24

- Morton Gould Symphony No. 2. Albany Records 605

Steven Stucky: Son et Lumiere
Gabriel Ian Gould: Watercolors (Robert Sheena, English horn)
John Harbison: Cello Concerto (David Finckel, cello)
Morton Gould: Symphony No. 2, "On Marching Tunes"

- Vincent Persichetti. Albany Records 771
- Torke: Strawberry Fields. Ecstatic Records 92208

Michael Torke: Strawberry Fields
Michael Torke: Pentecost for soprano and orchestra (Margaret Lloyd, soprano)

== Honors and awards ==
The orchestra won the Grammy Award for Best Classical Instrumental Solo in 2014 for its recording of John Corigliano's Conjurer - Concerto for Percussionist & String Orchestra with soloist Evelyn Glennie on the Naxos label. The orchestra was nominated in 2020 for a recording of Derek Bermel’s Migration Series for Jazz Ensemble and Orchestra in the Grammy Award for Best Contemporary Classical Composition category. Conductor David Alan Miller was also nominated that year along with Tessa Lark for a recording of Michael Torke's Sky, Concerto for Violin in the Grammy Award for Best Classical Instrumental Solo category. In 2021, the orchestra won a second Grammy award in the Best Classical Instrumental Solo category with a recording of Theofandis' Concerto for Viola and Chamber Orchestra with soloist Richard O’Neill and with conductor David Alan Miller on the Albany Records label. The orchestra has won 26 awards from the American Society of Composers and Performers (ASCAP) for adventurous programming. ASCAP also awarded the orchestra the John S. Edwards Award for Strongest Commitment to New American Music in 2013 and 2014.

== In popular culture ==
In Hernan Diaz's 2022 Pulitzer Prize-winning novel Trust, the Albany Symphony Orchestra is said to have been first endowed by the music-loving wife of the novel's fictional billionaire.
