= Alfreda Chippendale =

American actress

- Born: Alfreda Schoolcraft; 1842; New Orleans, Louisiana
- Died: November 9, 1887 (aged 44–45); Lancashire, England, UK
- Other name: Alfy Chippendale
- Occupation: Actress
- Years active: 1864-1887
- Spouse(s): William B. Chippendale (1860-1864; his death); William Calder (1872-1887; her death)

Alfreda "Alfy" Chippendale (née Schoolcraft; 1842 – November 9, 1887) was an American stage actress who made appearances in the United States and England.

== Early life ==
Born Alfreda Schoolcraft in New Orleans, Louisiana, into a family of actors and artists. She was reportedly the grandniece of President Zachary Taylor through her mother, Mathilda Schoolcraft.

Her father, Henry R. Schoolcraft was an actor who appeared in shows in Mobile, Alabama, and at Crisp's Gaiety Theater in New Orleans and who despite his death in 1854, saw to it that his son Luke Schoolcraft and his daughters Jane and Alfreda all pursued careers in theater. She and Jane performed sketches as a pair in local variety theater.

Alfreda married William B. Chippendale, scion of a famous English acting family headed by William Henry Chippendale about 1860. Her husband joined the Confederate Army as Second Lieutenant of the Louisiana 30th Infantry. He died in 1864 at the Battle of Ezra Church near Atlanta, Georgia.

== Acting career ==
Even as her husband was serving in the Confederate Army, Alfreda was appearing on the Northern stage. She appeared at the Winter Garden in New York City as Nanette in the burlesque Camille in June 1863. She also appeared as Sally in The Eton Boy that same season before appearing at the Griswold Opera House in Troy, New York, in 1864–65. Chippendale appeared in Louisville, Kentucky, in 1865 before returning to New Orleans in 1866.

In the early 1870s, Chippendale was traveling with the Irwin Selden Combination when she married its proprietor William Calder on December 8, 1872, in St. Charles County, Missouri. She went on to appear as Topsy in Uncle Tom's Cabin in New York City and such was the acclaim that she and her husband were engaged to appear on stage in England in the same roles. They sailed on August 3, 1878, and subsequently they appeared in London in Uncle Tom's Cabin and Rip Van Winkle. Later, Chippendale and Calder performed in The White Slave and The Shadows of a Great City.

== Death ==
Alfy Chippendale died in Lancashire on November 9, 1887.
