= United States Post Office (Gouverneur, New York) =

- US Post Office-Gouverneur
- U.S. National Register of Historic Places
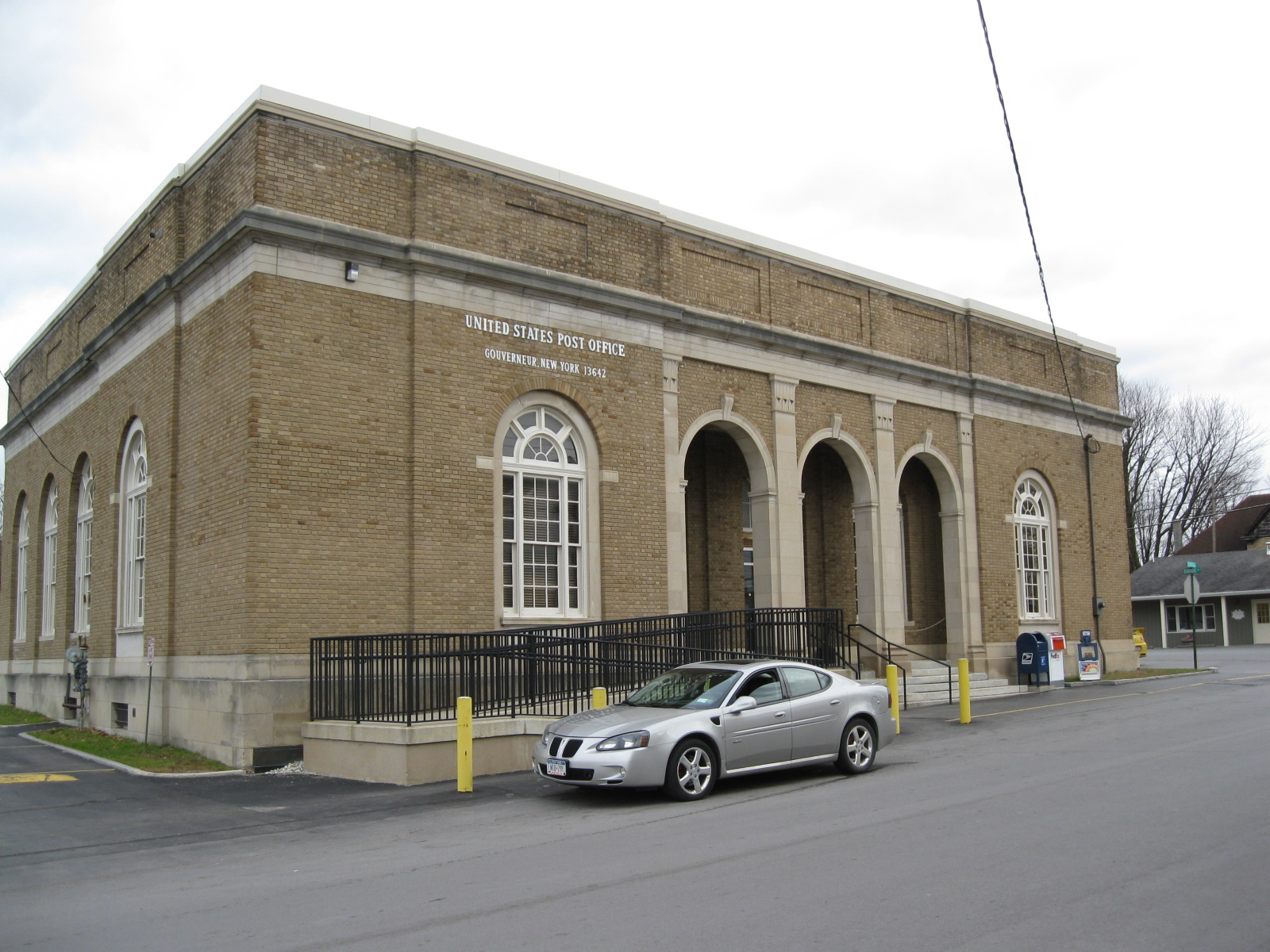
- U.S. Post Office Gouverneur, NY, November 2009

- Location within New York Location within the United States
- Location: 35 Grove St., Gouverneur, New York
- Coordinates: 44°20′6″N 75°27′58″W
- Area: less than one acre
- Built: 1915
- Architect: Wetmore, James A.
- Architectural style: Colonial Revival
- MPS: US Post Offices in New York State, 1858-1943, TR
- NRHP reference No.: 88002516
- Added to NRHP: May 11, 1989

US Post Office-Gouverneur is a historic post office building located at Gouverneur in St. Lawrence County, New York. It was designed and built in 1915–1917, and is one of a number of post offices in New York State designed by the Office of the Supervising Architect of the Treasury Department, James A. Wetmore. The building is in the Colonial Revival style and is a one-story, five bay masonry structure clad with a low limestone faced foundation. The main facade features a three bay recessed portico.

It was listed on the National Register of Historic Places in 1989.
