= Lillian Tait Sheldon =

American composer and organist (1865–1925)

Lillian Alison Tait Sheldon (10 September 1865 – 10 January 1925) was an American composer and organist who composed many hymns.

Sheldon was born in Gouverneur, New York to Lucretia Maria and George Peter Tait. She married James Otis Sheldon and they had two children. Little is known about Sheldon's education. She was the organist of the First Presbyterian Church in Gouverneur from 1885 until her death in 1925. Although most of her compositions were hymns, her "Rock-a-By Baby Lullaby" was published in the January 1897 edition of Ladies' Home Journal.

Sheldon's music was also published by B.F. Woods Music Co., J. Fischer & Brother, and Oliver Ditson Co. Her compositions, all for voice and piano, included:

- "Around the Great White Throne"
- "He Knows"
- "Hear, Forgive and Save" (text by Eliza Morris)
- "Hosanna We Sing" (text by Rev George S. Hodges)
- "Jesus, Shepherd of the Sheep" (text by Henry Book)
- "Lord, Within Thy Temple Fair"
- "More Love to Thee, O Christ"
- "Rest"
- "Resurrection"
- "Rock-a-By Baby Lullaby" (text adapted from Charles Fremont Gale)
- "Ten Thousand Times Ten Thousand
- "Through Peace to Light"
