= Julius Hegyi =

American conductor and violinist

- Julius Hegyi
- Born: February 2, 1923; New York City
- Died: January 1, 2007 (aged 83); Phoenix, Arizona
- Occupations: conductor and violinist

Julius Hegyi (February 2, 1923 – January 1, 2007) was an American conductor and violinist.

He spent his lifetime building orchestras, founding chamber music groups and instilling a passion for music in young and old alike. His belief in contemporary music, especially American music, as conductor, violinist and mentor, brought compelling listening experiences to his audiences. Hegyi was well known for his expert grasp of European repertoire, routinely giving commanding performances of Beethoven and Brahms, for example.

== Background ==
Hegyi was an active proponent of American music, with concerts devoted to world premieres of many composers. He performed works by contemporary European and Chinese composers, as well.

- Performed first concert on the violin, age 10
- Attended Stuyvesant High School, NYC, 1941
- Graduate, The Juilliard School, NYC, studying violin with Sascha Jacobsen and Edouard Dethier; graduating with high honors; recipient of the Frank Damrosch Memorial Scholarship.
- The Town Hall, NYC, recitals, 1945 and 1946
- Violinist: Berkshire String Quartet; New York Civic Orchestra, Leopold Stokowski conductor; the New York Philharmonic; RCA Victor Symphony; Radio City Music Hall Symphony; the New York City Center Ballet Orchestra; Little Symphony Orchestra, NYC; Contemporary Music Society, Solomon Guggenheim Museum, NYC
- Founder, Amati String Quartet
- Studied conducting with Dimitris Mitropoulos
- Conductor, Southwestern Symphony Center Orchestra, 1948
- Concertmaster and associate conductor, San Antonio Symphony, 1948
- Founder and conductor, San Antonio Little Symphony, 1948–1950
- Conductor/violinist, Inspiration Point Fine Arts Colony , Eureka Springs, AR, 1951–1956
- Music Director, Abilene Symphony Orchestra, 1952–1954
- Prize Winner, First International Competition for Conductors, Liverpool, England, 1958
- Member, American Symphony Orchestra League, 1958-
- Co-founder, Music in The Round, chamber music series, with Charlotte Hegyi, 1954–1985
- Conductor, Chattanooga Symphony Orchestra, 1955–1965
- Founder/violinist, Hegyi Piano Trio, Chattanooga, TN, 1955 to 1962, with pianist Charlotte Hegyi, and cellist Martha McCrory
- Founder and First Director, Sewanee Summer Music Center, 1956–1962
- Conductor/violinist, Southwestern Regional Composers' Forum, University of Alabama, Tuscaloosa, AL, 1957–1965
- Faculty, music department, Williams College, Williamstown, MA, 1965–1985
- Music Director and Conductor, Berkshire Symphony Orchestra, Williamstown, MA, 1965–1985
- Conductor, Lake George Opera Company, 1971
- Music Director, Principal Conductor, Albany Symphony Orchestra, 1966 to 1987
- Conductor Emeritus, Albany Symphony Orchestra, Albany, NY, 1987-
- Guest Conductor/violinist, New York Philharmonic (1987), Philadelphia Orchestra (1978), Wichita, KS, Charlotte, NC, Oak Ridge, TN, Troy, NY, Schenectady, NY, Little Red School House, NYC, Sacramento, CA, Beijing Symphony Orchestra and Shanghai Symphony Orchestra (1985); as well as orchestras in Romania, Puerto Rico and El Salvador.
- Winner, Columbia University's Alice M. Ditson Conductor's Award, 1983 for programming and sponsoring American Music
- Resident Conductor, Florida Philharmonic, 1991 to 1992
- Married from 1944 - 1948 to his first wife, Elaine Shapiro. They had one child, Lee Silver born 1945, died 2001.
- Married from 1949 - 1950 to his second wife, Martha Jane Bucy of Lubbock, Texas, and they were divorced in 1950. There were no children from this union.
- Married from 1953 - 1992 to his third wife, Charlotte Barrier of Lubbock, Texas, and lived in Chattanooga, TN and Williamstown, MA. They had one child, Lisa Hegyi Raymond born in 1962.
- Married from 1994 - 2007 to his fourth wife, Nancy King Hegyi.
- Survived by widow, Nancy Hegyi, of Fountain Hills, Arizona, sister Louise Larson, daughter Lisa Hegyi Raymond, and grandchildren.
- Predeceased by son, Lee Silver, of Plainfield, VT

== Performances ==
Hegyi, in his role as conductor/violinist, performed many world premieres, such as:

- Fredric Goossen, Litanies, Chattanooga Symphony Orchestra, 1964
- Jacob Druckman, Lamia, for soprano and orchestra, Albany Symphony Orchestra, 1974
- Carson Kievman, Second Symphony, "Resurrection", Florida Philharmonic Orchestra, 1991
- Charles Wuorinen, Third Piano Concerto, Albany Symphony Orchestra, soloist, Garrick Ohlsson
- Malcolm Arnold, Eighth Symphony, Albany Symphony Orchestra, May 1979
- Tobias Picker, The Encantadas, Albany Symphony Orchestra, 1983
- Robert Starer, Quartet for piano, violin, viola, cello, Music in the Round, 1977

Hegyi performed works by an extensive number of American composers, including John Alden Carpenter, Henry Hadley, Leo Sowerby, Daniel Gregory Mason, Quincy Porter, Scott Lindroth, George W. Chadwick, Ezra Laderman, Horatio Parker, Lester Trimble, Margaret Fairlie-Kennedy, Michael Schelle, Tobias Picker, Irwin Bazelon, Francis Thorne, Charles Wuorinen, Jacob Druckman, Aaron Copland, George Crumb, Robert Parris, Sydney Hodkinson, Leonardo Balada, Carson Kievman, Frederic Goossen, Walter Piston, Leonard Bernstein, Edward MacDowell, Morton Gould, Samuel Barber, William Schuman, Robert Ward, Wallingford Riegger.

== Reviews ==
John Rockwell wrote in the New York Times "...it can be flatly said that the best performance (and the most unusually interesting piece, too) was Mr. Hegyi's account of Barber's one-movement symphony, which had its premiere in 1936, was revised in 1944 and championed by Artur Rodzinski and Bruno Walter. The score blends considerable passion with Barber's wonderfully characteristic arching lyricism. Mr. Hegyi, who has a good deal of experience with 20th-century American music, given the Albany Symphony's venturesome commitment to that cause, played it with a sure technical command that never got in the way of expressivity."

== Discography ==
- Carpenter/Hadley/Mason/Porter, New World Records, Albany Symphony Orchestra, conductor, Julius Hegyi, 1984
- Albany Symphony Orchestra-Trimble/Laderman, Composers Recordings, Inc., Albany Symphony Orchestra, Julius Hegyi, conductor, 1985
- Parker, Horatio/Chadwick, George W.,, New World Records, Albany Symphony Orchestra, Julius Hegyi, conductor, 1986
- Music in the Round, Williamstown, MA, Divertimento in E flat major, W.A. Mozart
- Music in the Round, Williamstown, MA, 6 Duos for Violin and Cello, WV 50-55 (Hoffmann, Heinrich Anton)
