= Margaret Wigham =

Margaret Viola Wigham (February 3, 1904 – April 17, 1972) was a composer, music educator and pianist, born in Minnesota. She was nationally known as a mid-century composer of student piano pieces. Her pieces often had an educational focus such as chromaticism, counterpoint, learning to play in different keys, or using each hand independently. Her works were published by Oliver Ditson Co., Willis Music, Harold Flammer Inc, Belwin Inc, and R. D. Row. They were also published in Braille and made available through the Library of Congress National Library Service for the Blind and Print Disabled.

Her compositions include:

== Orchestra ==
- Concerto for Two Pianos

== Piano ==
- Bachette
- By the Little Mill
- Carefree
- Fun with a Hoop
- Gay Caprice
- Happitat
- Hop Along My Little Froggie
- In the Chapel
- Introduction and Sonatina
- Just Before Dawn
- Little Prelude
- Merrily Over the Waves We Go
- Musical Moods in All Keys
- Musical Playmates
- Now It's Time to Run and Play
- O So Happy
- Old Cowboy Trail
- On Swan Lake
- Puppet Mischief
- Rhapsody
- Scampering Whole Steps
- Scherzino

== Vocal ==
- “I Wonder Where the Robins Go?” (words by Margaret Wigham and Wilma Wigham)
