= Lalla Ryckoff =

American composer

Clara Amely “Lala” Ryckoff (2 August 1878 - 3 December 1977) was an American composer who wrote more than 200 vocal works (both text and music), including spoken word performances with musical accompaniment, also known as pianologues or musical readings. She also composed works for children. She published under the name Lalla Ryckoff.

Ryckoff was born in Milwaukee, Wisconsin, to Julie Wolff Rindskopf and Samuel Rindskopf. The family name was later changed to Ryckoff. Little is known about Ryckoff’s education or personal life. She first performed as a pianist in Chicago when she was nine years old. She was active in women’s clubs, worked as a piano teacher in New York City in 1922, and in 1932 was living in Kansas City. The 1950 census lists her as divorced. She died in Newport Beach, California, in 1977.

Ryckoff’s works were published by Walter Anderson, Oliver Ditson, and Clayton F. Summy Company. They include:

== Piano ==
- Fairy Tales for Fairy Fingers
- Hansel and Gretel
- Ivan in Russia
- Juvenile Scenes in Foreign Lands
- Liesel
- Our American Cousins
- Our Little Cousins Abroad
- Pepi and Mitzi
- Street Scenes
- Turkish Veil Dancers

== Vocal ==
- “Autumn Leaves” (text by anonymous)
- “Grandma Pays the Bill” (text by anonymous)
- “He Met Her in the Meadow” (text by anonymous)
- “I Doubt It”
- “Invy” (text by anonymous)
- “It’s Just for You”
- “Musical Campaign Speech”
- “Poor Jane”
- “Quarrelsome Glee Club” (quartet for male voices)
- “This World Seems a Great Old World to Me”
- “Tit for Tat” (text by anonymous)
- “To Marry or Not Marry” (text by anonymous)
- “Why Don’t You Ask Me” (text by Samuel Lover)
- “Um-Hm” (text by anonymous)
