= Gouverneur, New York =

Gouverneur
- Town
- Town of Gouverneur
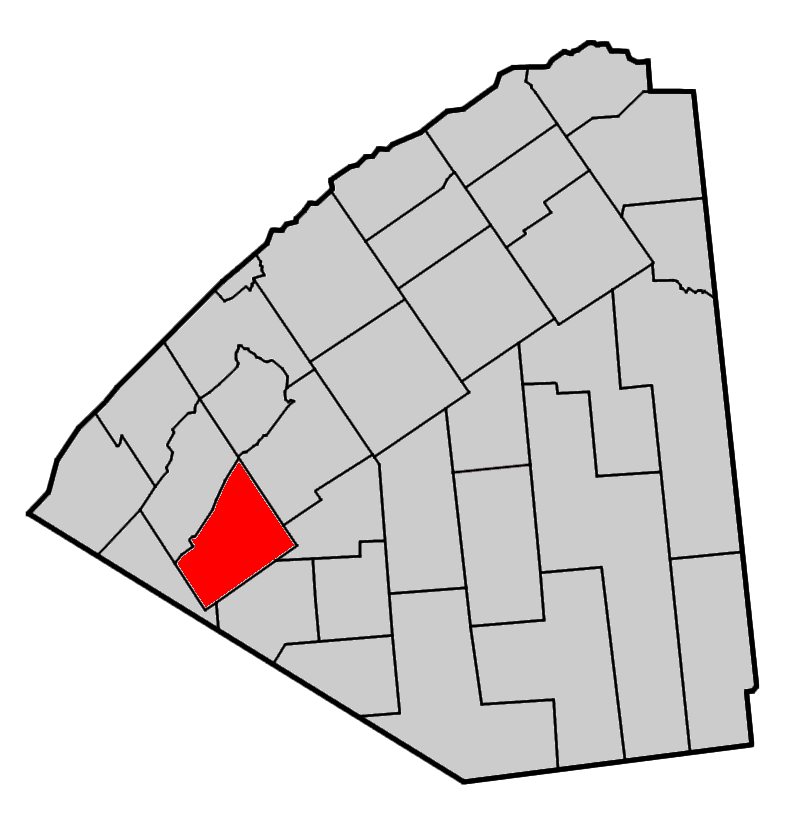
- Map highlighting Gouverneur's location within St. Lawrence County.

- Location within the state of New York
- Coordinates: 44°20′04″N 75°27′59″W
- Country: United States
- State: New York
- County: St. Lawrence
- Named for: Gouverneur Morris

Area
  - Total: 72.4 sq mi (187.6 km^{2})
  - Land: 71.5 sq mi (185.3 km^{2})
  - Water: 0.89 sq mi (2.3 km^{2})
- Elevation: 440 ft (134 m)

Population (2020)
  - Total: 6,551
- Time zone: UTC-5 (Eastern (EST))
  - Summer (DST): UTC-4 (EDT)
- FIPS code: 36-29597
- GNIS feature ID: 0976353
- Website: https://www.townofgouverneur.gov/

Gouverneur (/ɡʌvərnɔːr/ guh-vər-NOR) is a town in St. Lawrence County, New York, United States. As of the 2020 census, the population was 6,551. That was down from 7,085 in 2010. The town is named after statesman and landowner Gouverneur Morris.

The Town of Gouverneur contains a village named Gouverneur. The town is near the southwestern border of St. Lawrence County and is southwest of Canton, the county seat.

== History ==
The region was first settled around 1805.

The Town of Gouverneur was formed in 1810 from part of the Town of Oswegatchie (previously an area called "Town of Cambria").

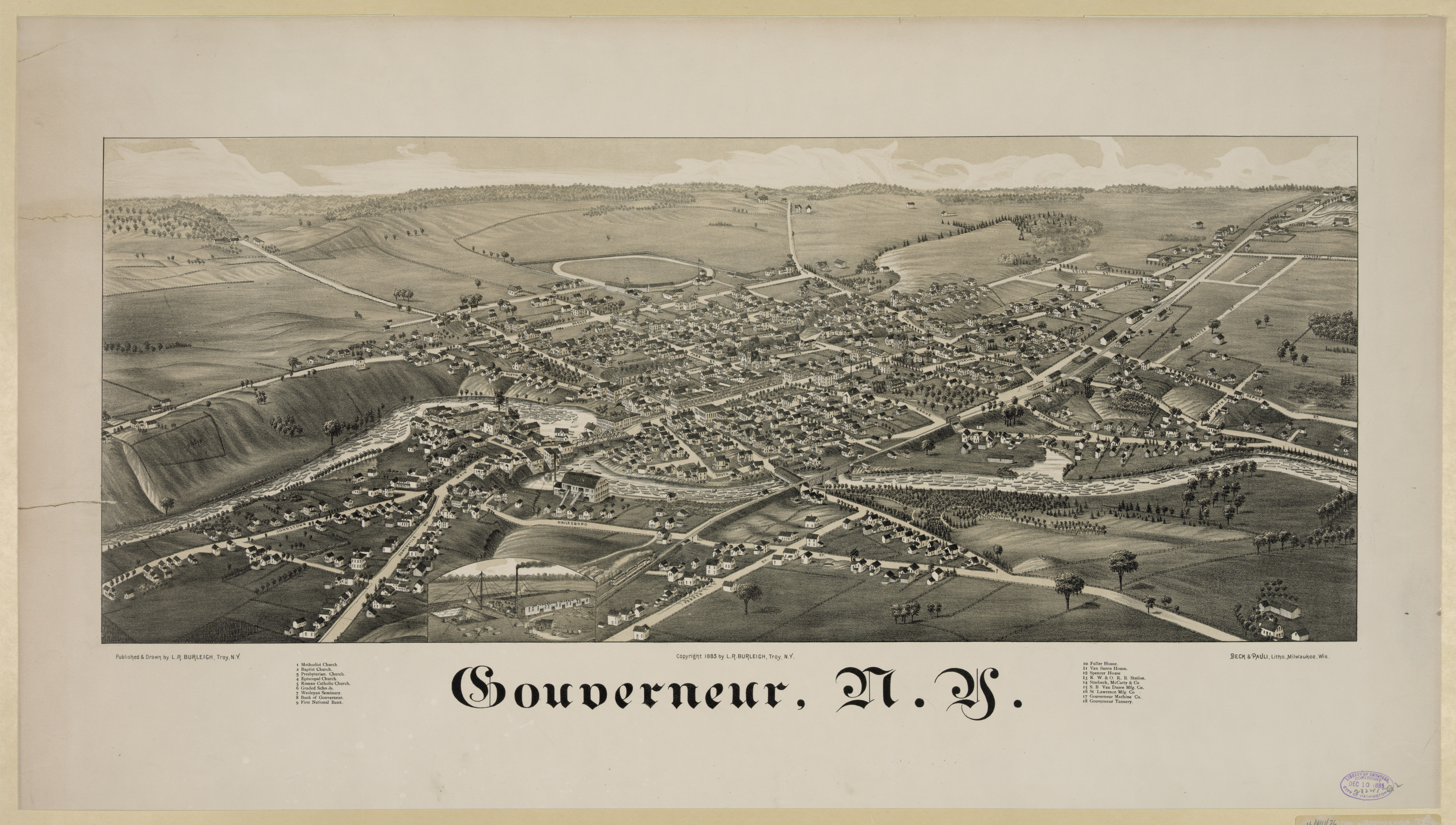
Lithograph of Gouverneur from 1885 by L.R. Burleigh with list of landmarks

Like many other settlements in the county, the town's growth was hindered by the War of 1812, although rapid growth resumed soon after.

In 1850, the community of Gouverneur set itself off from the town by incorporating as a village.

The town economy was based in part on mining marble, talc, and zinc.

The United States Post Office was listed on the National Register of Historic Places in 1989.

== Geography ==
According to the United States Census Bureau, the town has a total area of 72.4 square miles (187.6 km^{2}), of which 71.5 square miles (185.3 km^{2}) is land and 0.9 square mile (2.3 km^{2}) (1.24%) is water.

The Oswegatchie River flows through the town in two directions, westward in the south and eastward in the north.

U.S. Route 11, New York State Route 58, and New York State Route 812 converge at Gouverneur village. NY-58 and NY-812 are conjoined southwest of the village, and US-11 and NY-812 are conjoined northeast of the village. Due to the low area population and relatively little through traffic, the area's highways and the Gouverneur Town Court experience relatively light traffic flow.

=== Climate ===
Climate data for Gouverneur, New York, 1991–2020 normals, extremes 1937–present
Month	Jan	Feb	Mar	Apr	May	Jun	Jul	Aug	Sep	Oct	Nov	Dec	Year
Record high °F (°C)	65 (18)	67 (19)	81 (27)	87 (31)	90 (32)	96 (36)	97 (36)	98 (37)	94 (34)	87 (31)	78 (26)	70 (21)	98 (37)
Mean maximum °F (°C)	51.9 (11.1)	49.1 (9.5)	60.6 (15.9)	76.8 (24.9)	83.4 (28.6)	87.1 (30.6)	88.7 (31.5)	88.3 (31.3)	85.6 (29.8)	76.7 (24.8)	66.3 (19.1)	54.9 (12.7)	90.7 (32.6)
Mean daily maximum °F (°C)	26.5 (−3.1)	29.2 (−1.6)	38.5 (3.6)	53.2 (11.8)	66.0 (18.9)	74.9 (23.8)	79.2 (26.2)	78.2 (25.7)	71.2 (21.8)	57.6 (14.2)	45.1 (7.3)	32.6 (0.3)	54.4 (12.4)
Daily mean °F (°C)	15.8 (−9.0)	17.5 (−8.1)	27.8 (−2.3)	42.2 (5.7)	54.1 (12.3)	63.7 (17.6)	68.3 (20.2)	66.7 (19.3)	58.8 (14.9)	47.0 (8.3)	35.9 (2.2)	23.8 (−4.6)	43.5 (6.4)
Mean daily minimum °F (°C)	5.1 (−14.9)	5.8 (−14.6)	17.0 (−8.3)	31.2 (−0.4)	42.1 (5.6)	52.5 (11.4)	57.3 (14.1)	55.2 (12.9)	46.5 (8.1)	36.4 (2.4)	26.7 (−2.9)	15.0 (−9.4)	32.6 (0.3)
Mean minimum °F (°C)	−24.4 (−31.3)	−20.8 (−29.3)	−8.6 (−22.6)	17.2 (−8.2)	27.5 (−2.5)	38.4 (3.6)	44.8 (7.1)	41.6 (5.3)	31.4 (−0.3)	21.6 (−5.8)	7.6 (−13.6)	−12.1 (−24.5)	−28.8 (−33.8)
Record low °F (°C)	−45 (−43)	−40 (−40)	−29 (−34)	−2 (−19)	20 (−7)	29 (−2)	36 (2)	30 (−1)	22 (−6)	13 (−11)	−12 (−24)	−43 (−42)	−45 (−43)
Average precipitation inches (mm)	2.76 (70)	2.12 (54)	2.29 (58)	3.15 (80)	3.26 (83)	3.91 (99)	3.76 (96)	3.36 (85)	3.78 (96)	4.66 (118)	3.57 (91)	2.95 (75)	39.57 (1,005)
Average snowfall inches (cm)	23.7 (60)	23.0 (58)	15.1 (38)	4.2 (11)	0.1 (0.25)	0.0 (0.0)	0.0 (0.0)	0.0 (0.0)	0.0 (0.0)	0.8 (2.0)	7.2 (18)	18.3 (46)	92.4 (233.25)
Average extreme snow depth inches (cm)	13.0 (33)	14.1 (36)	9.0 (23)	2.3 (5.8)	0.0 (0.0)	0.0 (0.0)	0.0 (0.0)	0.0 (0.0)	0.0 (0.0)	0.6 (1.5)	4.5 (11)	7.9 (20)	17.2 (44)
Average precipitation days (≥ 0.01 in)	16.5	12.8	12.7	12.5	12.1	12.4	11.1	10.3	10.5	13.7	14.3	17.3	156.2
Average snowy days (≥ 0.1 in)	12.6	9.9	7.5	2.4	0.2	0.0	0.0	0.0	0.0	0.4	4.5	11.0	48.5
Source 1: NOAA
Source 2: National Weather Service

Historical population
Census	Pop.	Note	%±
1820	765		—
1830	1,552		102.9%
1840	2,538		63.5%
1850	2,783		9.7%
1860	3,201		15.0%
1870	3,539		10.6%
1880	4,165		17.7%
1890	5,851		40.5%
1900	5,915		1.1%
1910	6,020		1.8%
1920	5,762		−4.3%
1930	5,512		−4.3%
1940	5,900		7.0%
1950	6,506		10.3%
1960	6,757		3.9%
1970	6,710		−0.7%
1980	6,629		−1.2%
1990	6,985		5.4%
2000	7,418		6.2%
2010	7,085		−4.5%
2020	6,551		−7.5%
U.S. Decennial Census

== Demographics ==
=== 2020 census ===
As of the census of 2020, the town had a population of 6,551 and 2,405 households. The population density was 91.1 inhabitants per square mile (35.2/km²), and there were 2,784 housing units at an average density of 39.1 per square mile (15.1/km²).

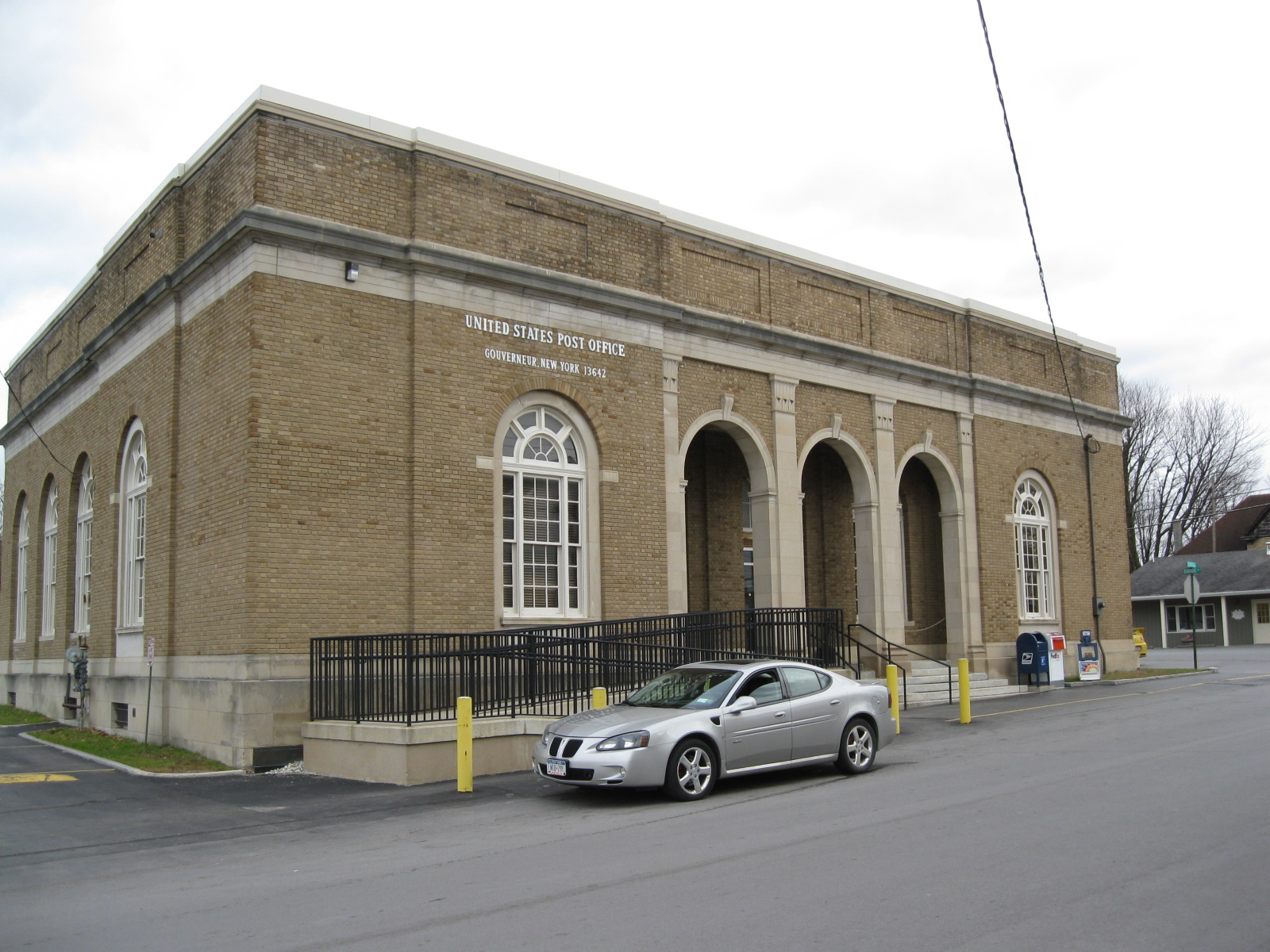
Gouverneur's U.S. Post Office is listed on the National Trust for Historic Preservation since 1989

The racial makeup of the town was 83.5% White, 4.9% Black or African American, 5.9% Hispanic or Latino of any race, and 5.7% from other races or two or more races.

The average household size was 2.4, and the median age was 38.8 years.

The median household income was $44,933, and the per capita income was $24,200. Approximately 23.4% of the population lived below the poverty line.

=== Education (ACS 2019–2023 estimates) ===
Approximately 82.3% of residents aged 25 and over had at least a high school diploma, and 21.0% held a bachelor’s degree or higher.

== Communities and locations in Gouverneur ==
- Elmdale – A hamlet in the northwestern part of the town on NY-58 and the Oswegatchie River.
- Gouverneur – The Village of Gouverneur is on US-11 at the Oswegatchie River, near the eastern town line.
- Halls Corners – A hamlet in the northern part of the town, south of North Gouverneur.
- Little Bow – A hamlet northwest of Gouverneur village.
- Natural Dam – A hamlet on NY-58 west of Gouverneur village, where Gouverneur Morris once had a summer home. The name arose due to a large rock, partially blocking the Oswegatchie River.
- North Gouverneur – A hamlet in the northern part of the town west of County Road 11.
- Reservoir Hill – An elevation by the town line, east of Gouverneur village.
- Staplin Corners – A hamlet in the northern part of the town, north of North Gouverneur.

== Notable people ==
- Phil Hanlon (b. 1955), mathematician and former president of Dartmouth College
- Brian Leonard (b. 1984), former running back for the Tampa Bay Buccaneers
- Edward John Noble (1882–1958), developer and marketer of Life Savers
- Thomas Lee Pangle (b. 1944), political scientist
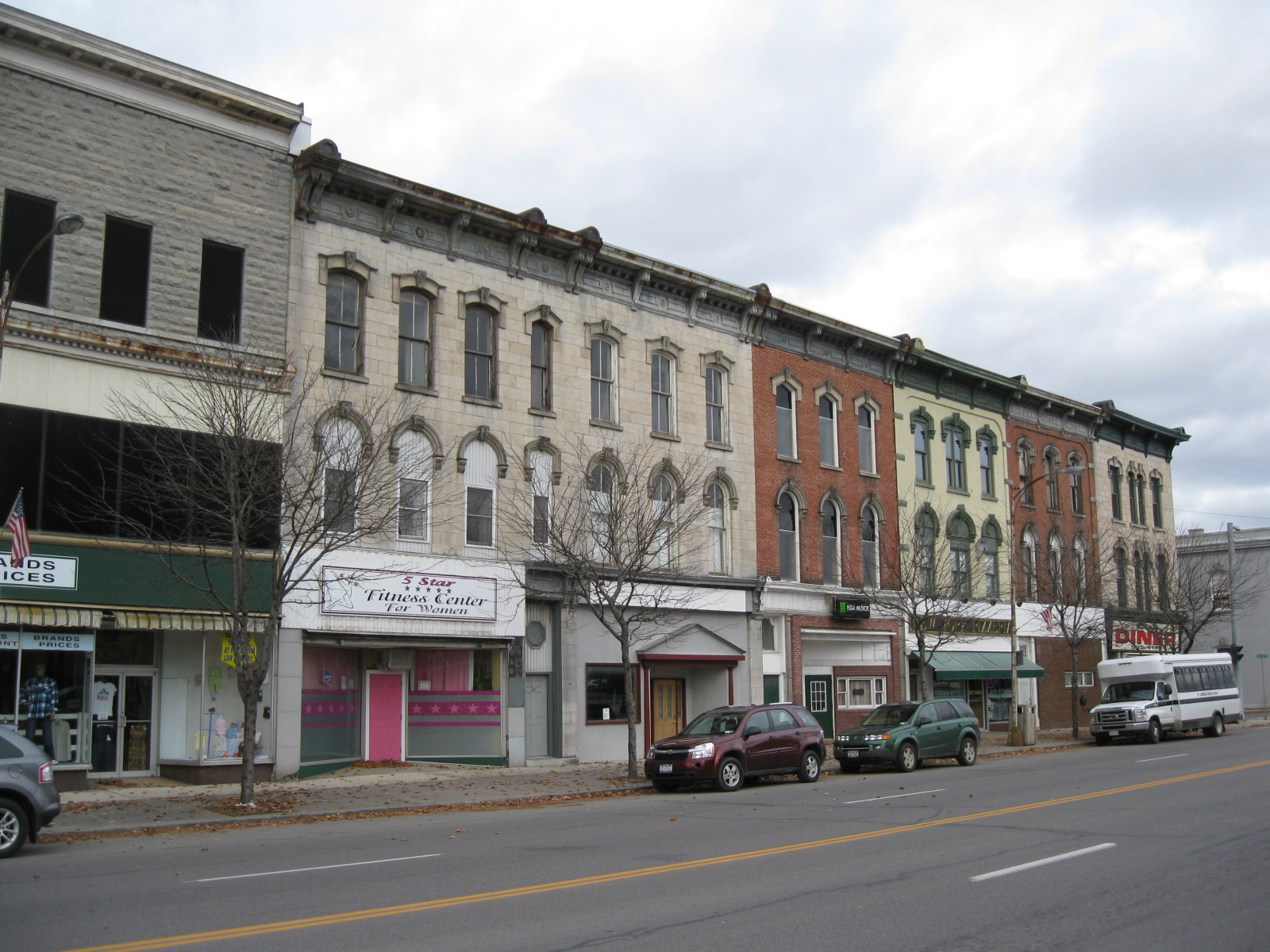
- A modern-day photograph of a portion of downtown Gouverneur, New York
  William R. Rowley (1824–1886), American Civil War general
- Lillian Tait Sheldon (1865–1925), composer
- Dan Everett Waid (1864–1939), architect
- Tudi Wiggins (1935–2006), Canadian actress in daytime television dramas
- James Franklin Wiley, member of the Wisconsin State Senate
