= Chippindale =

Chippindale is an English surname. It is a less common variant of Chippendale. Another variant is Chippindall. People with the surname Chippindale include:

- Christopher Chippindale (born 1951), British archaeologist
- Peter Chippindale (1945–2014), British newspaper journalist and author
- Ron Chippindale (1933–2008), New Zealand air inspector
