= George H. Coes =

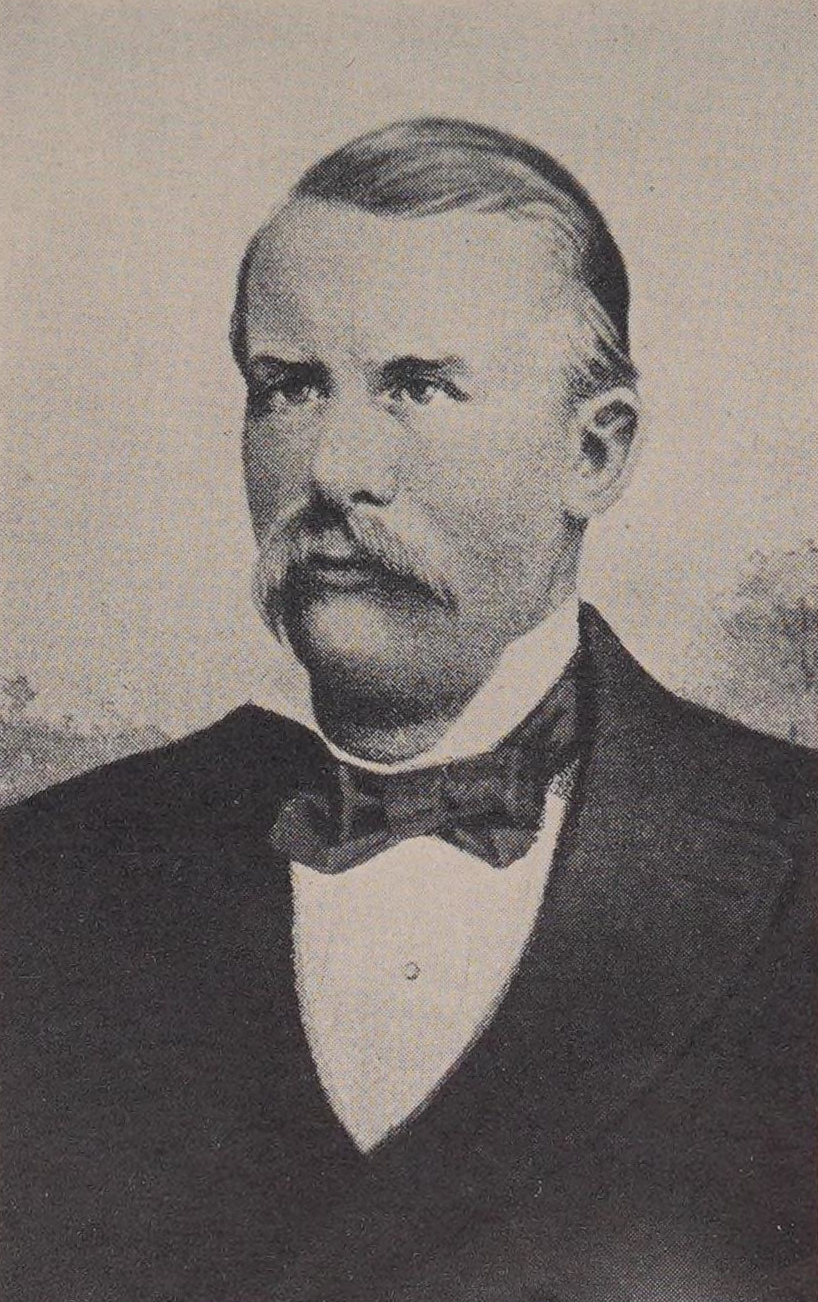

Background information
- Born: c. 1828
- Origin: Providence, Rhode Island
- Died: March 16, 1897
- Genres: Minstrel show
- Instrument: Banjo
- Years active: 1852–1889

George H. Coes (c. 1828 – March 16, 1897) was an American minstrel music performer. He appeared in numerous minstrel shows in California and throughout the Northeastern United States.

== Early life ==
Coes was born in Providence, Rhode Island in about 1828.

== Career in minstrelsy ==
Minstrelsy was America's first original contribution to the theater arts. It was popular from just before the American Civil War to the end of the 19th century. Though minstrelsy and its attendant use of blackface is now viewed as racist and anachronistic, it was the preeminent entertainment in the United States during the life of George H. Coes, and he was one of its most well-known and successful performers.

=== Early career ===
Coes went to California in 1852 and was associated with a number of minstrel acts, principally in San Francisco, before he returned east and opened with Woods and Christy's Minstrels in New York City in 1857. In 1858, Coes returned to California and joined with Sam Wells to form Coes and Wells' Minstrels. That partnership did not last and Coes returned to performing in other companies. In 1867, after years of performing in the minstrel companies of others, Coes joined with S.S. Purdy and Frank Converse to form Coes, Purdy and Converse's Party, which opened in Harlem on March 19, 1867.

=== Partnership with Schoolcraft ===
Coes joined with his old friend Luke Schoolcraft in 1874 and they formed "one of the most famous minstrel tandems in history." Schoolcraft & Coes appeared with a number of leading companies including Emerson's Megatherian Minstrels and Barlow, Wilson, Primrose & West. By 1880, the two settled with their families in Cambridge, Massachusetts and continued to tour throughout the country performing their minstrel act in a variety of shows and venues.

When Coes was unable to continue his career due to poor health in 1889, the partnership dissolved. Coes was stricken with paralysis in 1891 and died at his home at 205 Hampshire Street in Cambridge, Massachusetts on March 16, 1897.

== Compositions ==
George H. Coes produced a book of music in 1877, entitled George Coes' Album of Music which included a number of hits, including:

- Clouds and sunshine; or, I've just arrived from Dixie (1877)
