= Chippindall =

Chippindall is a surname. Notable people with the surname include:

- Edward Chippindall (1827–1902), British army officer
- Giles Chippindall (1893–1969), Australian public servant
- Lucy Katherine Armitage Chippindall (1913–1992), South African botanist

== See also ==
- Chippindale (disambiguation)
