= Luke Schoolcraft =

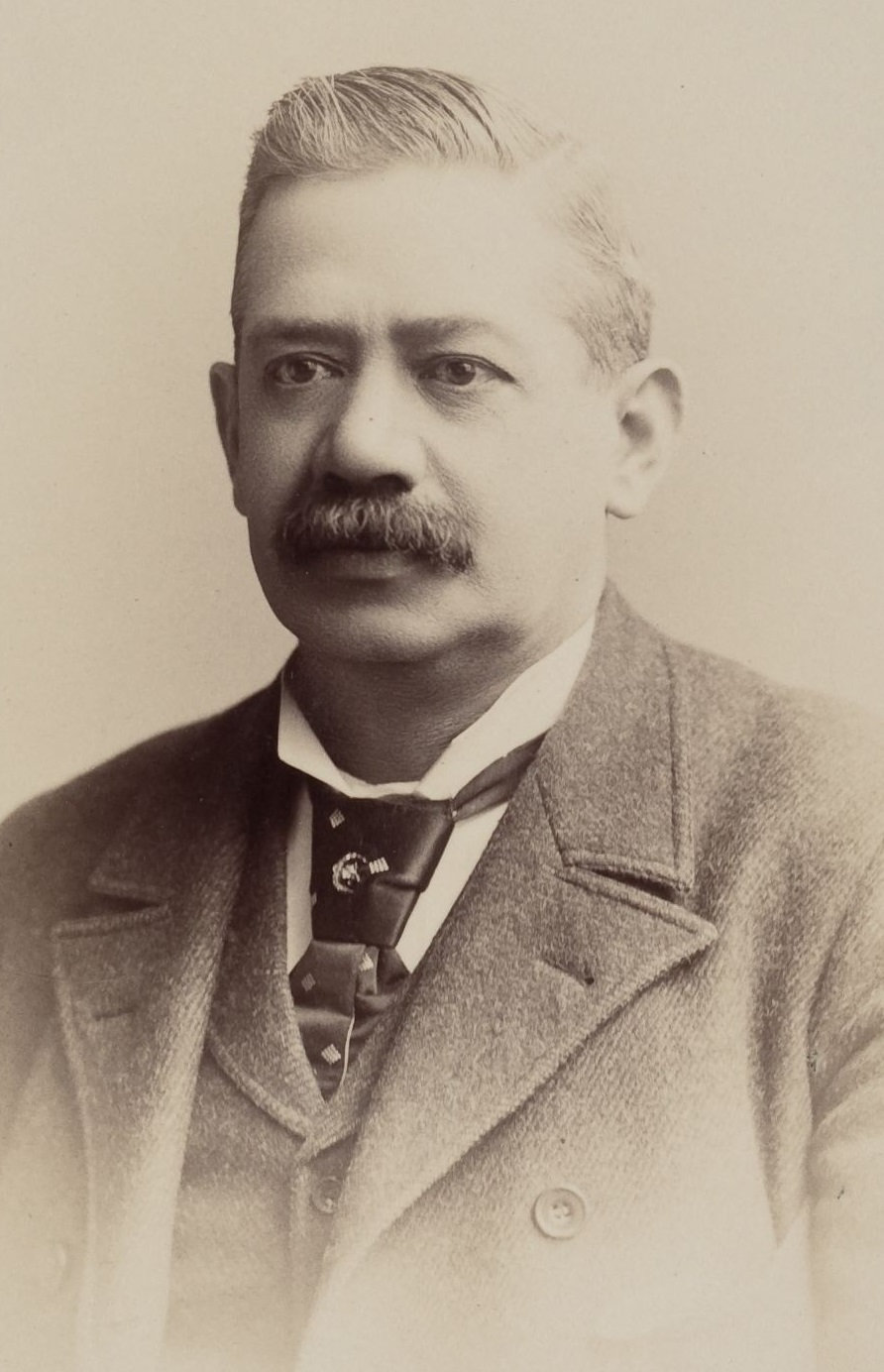
- Photo by William McKenzie Morrison

Background information
- Born: 1847
- Origin: New Orleans, Louisiana
- Died: March 10, 1893 (aged 45–46)
- Genres: Minstrel show
- Years active: 1865–1893

Luke Schoolcraft (November 13, 1847 - March 10, 1893) was an American minstrel music composer and performer. He appeared in numerous minstrel shows throughout the North after the American Civil War.

== Early life ==
Schoolcraft was born in New Orleans, Louisiana, into a family of actors and artists. His father, Henry R. Schoolcraft was an actor who appeared in shows at Crisp's Gaiety Theater and who despite his death before 1860, saw to it that his son Luke and his daughters Jane and Alfreda (who would be famous in her own right as Alfreda Chippendale) all pursued careers in theater. Luke Schoolcraft's first stage performance was in 1851 in Rolla, the Richard Brinsley Sheridan adaptation of August von Kotzebue's Pizarro.

== Career in minstrelsy ==
Minstrelsy was America's first original contribution to the theater arts. It was popular from just before the American Civil War to the end of the 19th century. Today minstrelsy and its attendant blackface is viewed as racist and anachronistic, however it was the preeminent entertainment in the United States during the life of Luke Schoolcraft, and he was one of the most well-known and successful performers.

=== In Terre Haute ===
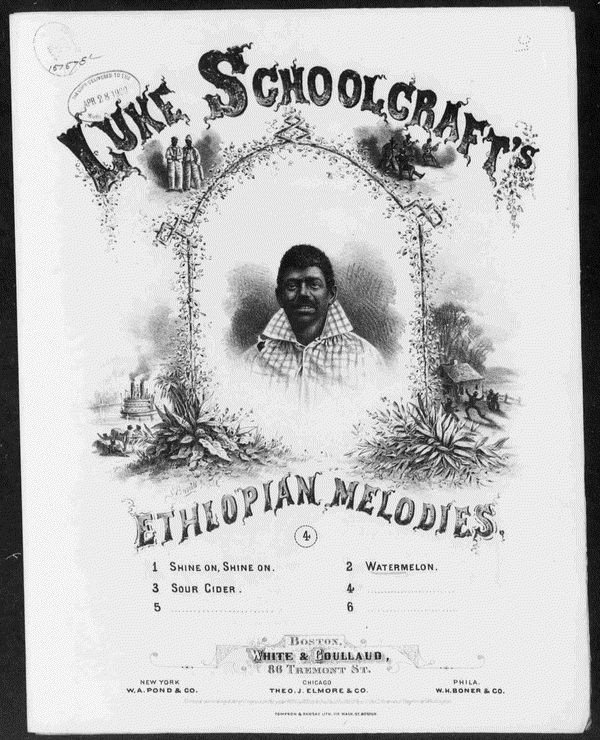
Cover of Schoolcraft's Minstrel Sheet Music

By his twenties, Schoolcraft was touring the nation and performing in variety shows. Negroes were not the only ethnic group who were lampooned in minstrel shows; indeed Schoolcraft began performing Dutch songs until several hits as a blackface performer landed him in the minstrel ranks. In 1870 he and his first wife Belle were living in St. Louis, Missouri, among a troupe of actors that included George H. Coes. Schoolcraft also had an early association with Billy Emerson and Schoolcraft settled in Terre Haute, Indiana, after 1870. He helped form a music academy in a former church that was popularly known as "Luke Schoolcraft's Academy of Music." It was in Terre Haute that Schoolcraft met and wed his second wife, Elizabeth Clark on January 7, 1871.

=== In New York City ===
In 1872, Schoolcraft moved to New York City and made a spectacular debut at Richard M. Hooley's Opera House in Brooklyn on March 25, 1872. Newspapers there declared that he was "an immediate hit." During this period, one of Schoolcraft's original songs, Oh! Dat Watermelon became popular. Today, this song is among the best-known minstrel pieces of that era.

=== Partnership with Coes ===
Schoolcraft joined with his old friend George H. Coes in 1874 and they formed "one of the most famous minstrel tandems in history." Schoolcraft & Coes appeared with a number of leading companies including Emerson's Megatherian Minstrels and Barlow, Wilson, Primrose & West. By 1880, the two settled with their families in Cambridge, Massachusetts, and continued to tour throughout the country performing their minstrel act in a variety of shows and venues.

When Coes was unable to continue his career due to poor health in 1889, the partnership dissolved. Schoolcraft continued to perform solo as part of a number of shows including Lew Dockstader's popular minstrel troupe. In 1892, Schoolcraft was a star in Russell's Comedians, a troupe of specialty artists. It was with this company that he performed his final show at the Walnut Street Theater in Cincinnati, Ohio. He died on March 10, 1893, in his room at the Hotel Stratford. His body was transported to Boston, his funeral was held at the Church of the Advent and he was buried in Cedar Grove Cemetery in Dorchester, Massachusetts.

== Compositions ==
Luke Schoolcraft produced a number of songs, but his most well-known pieces were:

- Oh! Dat Watermelon (1874)
- Shine On, Shine On (1874)

== See also ==
- Minstrel show
