= Oliver Ditson =

19th century American music publisher

- Born: October 20, 1811; Boston, Massachusetts
- Died: December 21, 1888 (aged 77); Boston, Massachusetts
- Occupation: Music publisher
- Known for: Pioneer of music publishing in America
- Children: 1
- Relatives: Alice M. Ditson (daughter-in-law)

Oliver Ditson (October 20, 1811 – December 21, 1888) was an American businessman and founder of Oliver Ditson and Company, one of the major music publishing houses of the late 19th century.

== Early life and career ==
Oliver Ditson was born in Boston, Massachusetts, of Scottish ancestry, on October 20, 1811. His parents lived near the home of Paul Revere at the lower end of Hanover Street.

In 1823, just out of grammar school, Oliver became an employee of Col. Samuel Hale Parker, father of J.C.D. Parker, the organist and composer. Col. Parker owned a book store on Washington street, near Franklin Street in Boston, and kept in addition to his regular stock a few pieces of music. At the time the Waverley novels were making their appearance and Col. Parker was republishing them as rapidly as they could be gotten from England.

Oliver left the bookstore to master the printer's trade. About 1834, fire destroyed the store of Col. Parker. With what was saved he moved with his now indispensable young friend into a wooden building on Washington street, near School street, and later took a single counter in the famous 'Old Corner Bookstore,' then kept by William D. Ticknor in the gambrel roofed building erected in 1712, at the northwest corner of Washington and School streets. At this location, in 1834, the firm of Parker & Ditson was formed. Mr. Ditson was then twenty-three, and changed it into a music store.

In 1840, Ditson bought out Col. Parker's interest and carried on the business of music seller and publisher under the name of Oliver Ditson.

He acquired the Oliver Ditson and Company moniker in 1857 when he began collaborating with John C. Haynes on what would become the John C. Haynes & Co.

Ditson's company published the first American edition of Haydn's The Creation, "Jingle Bells" and "Darling Nelly Gray", as well as most of the works of the Hutchinson Family - though Ditson refused to publish "Get Off the Track" due to its abolitionist sentiment.

In 1858, Ditson purchased Dwight's Journal of Music, a serious musical journal. In 1865 his son Charles Healy Ditson began working for his firm in Boston. When the firm established a New York branch in 1867 Charles was placed in charge of it, and it was named C. H. Ditson & Company.

During the American Civil War, Ditson released a number of popular songs, including "Battle Hymn of the Republic" and "Tenting on the Old Camp Ground".

Theodore Presser purchased the Ditson catalogue in 1931.

== Death ==
On December 21, 1888, Oliver Ditson, the pioneer of music publishing in America, died at his home in Boston at the age of seventy-seven.

== Published by Ditson ==
- Music by Anna Ware Poole
- Songs by Agnes Clune Quinlan
- Songs by Ossian E. Dodge
- Hymns by Emma Pitt
- Harp music by Gertrude Ina Robinson
- Piano pedagogy compositions by Louise Robyn
- Mandolin, guitar, and vocal music by Clara Ross
- Songs by Dagmar de Corval Rybner
- Songs, piano pieces, and musical readings by Lalla Ryckoff
- Music by Sophie Seipt
- Music by William Stuckenholz
- Hymns by Lillian Tait Sheldon
- Racquet Galop and other piano pieces by Kate Simmons
- Organ and vocal works by Fannie Morris Spencer
- American editions of Edvard Grieg's piano works, edited by Bertha Tapper
- Biographical Sketches of Eminent Musical Composers by Levina Buoncuore Urbino 1876 Internet Archive
- Compositions for rhythm band by author and music educator J. Lilian Vandevere
- Piano pedagogy pieces by Margaret Wigham
- Minstrel Songs Old and New (published 1882)

== Gallery ==
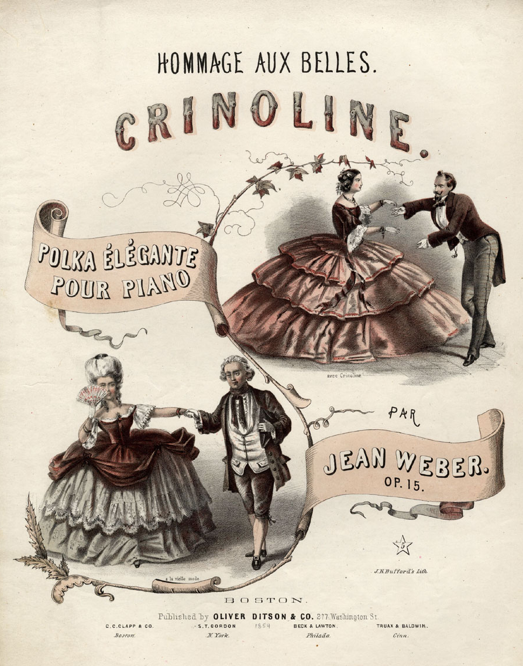
Sheet music for Quadrille Militaire "Les Hussards" by Charles A. White published by Oliver Ditson & Co., 277 Washington Street, Boston, 1854

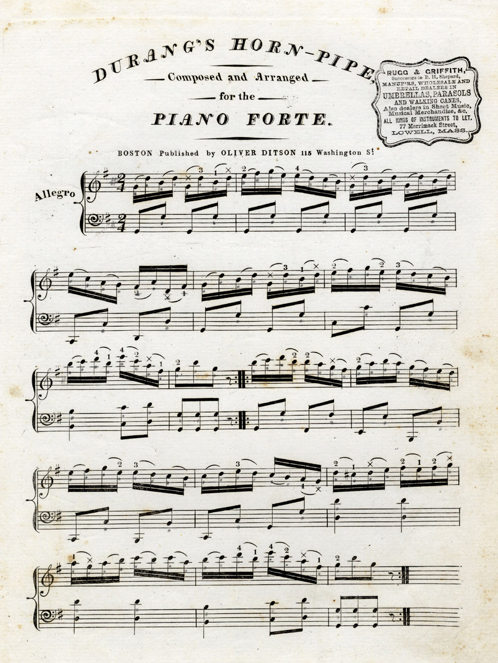
Sheet music for Durang's Horn Pipe published by Oliver Ditson, in Washington Street, Boston 19th century

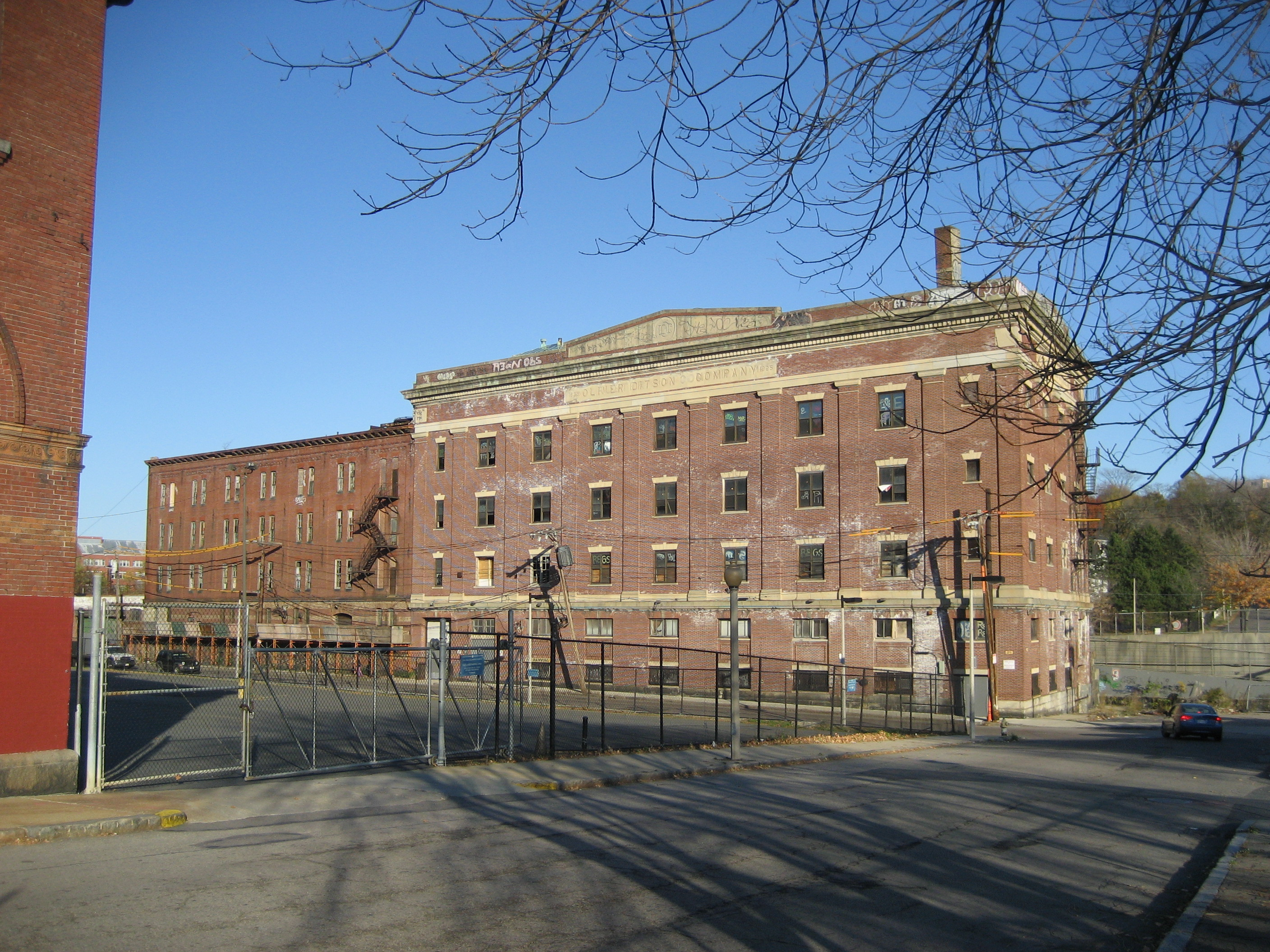
Former Oliver Ditson Company building, 166 Terrace Street, in the Mission Hill neighborhood of Roxbury, Massachusetts, later gutted and re-built as luxury apartments. Building inscription reads "Oliver Ditson Co. 1835-1925".

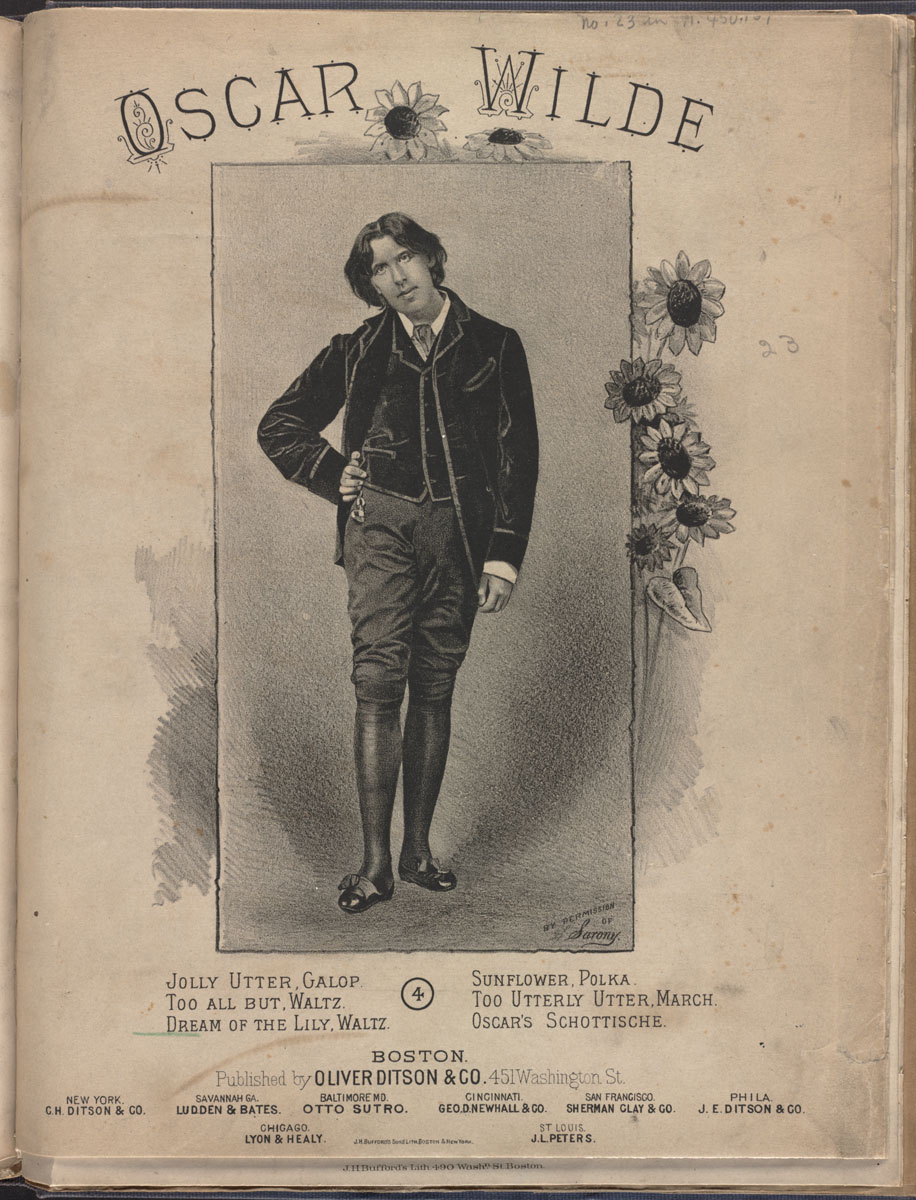
