= William Henry Chippendale =

English actor

William H. Chippendale
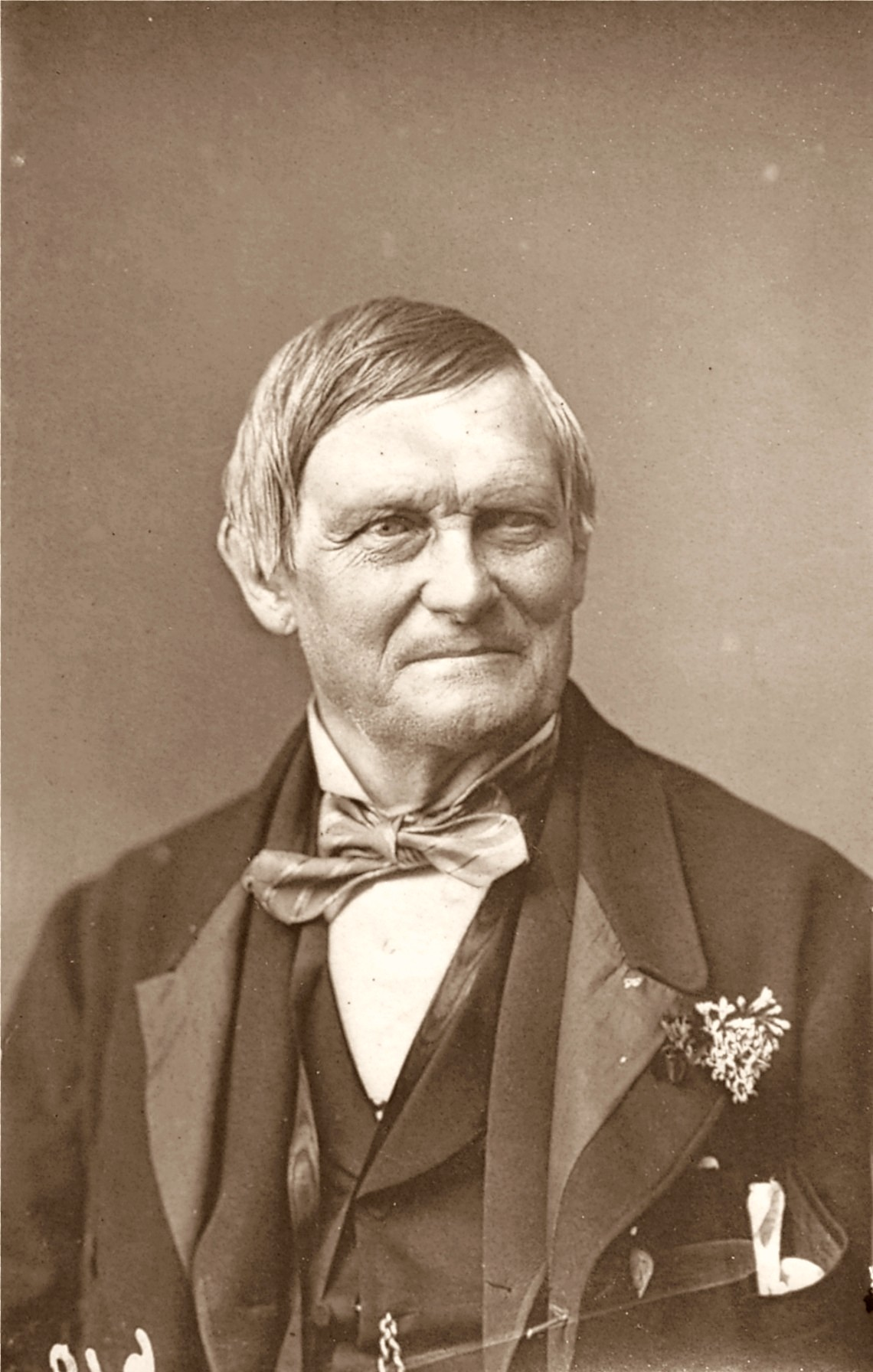
- William Henry Chippendale
- Born: 14 August 1801; Somers Town, London
- Died: 3 January 1888 (aged 86)
- Occupation: Actor

William Henry Chippendale (14 August 1801 – 3 January 1888) was an English actor, known in particular for his portrayal of old men.

== Life ==
He was born in Somers Town, London, on 14 Aug. 1801, and received some education at the high school, Edinburgh, in which city his father made his first appearance on 25 July 1814 as Polonius. Chippendale was placed with James Ballantyne to learn printing, and asserted, in error or oblivion, that he 'read' some of the Waverley manuscripts. He was subsequently apprenticed to John Ballantyne the auctioneer. He claimed to have played the Page to Stephen Kemble's Falstaff, and taken other boyish parts. In 1819, he made at Montrose, as David in the 'Rivals' his first professional appearance, and then became a strolling player. On 11 Jan. 1823, as Chippendale from Carlisle, he was at the Caledonian theatre, Edinburgh, playing Johnny Howie in 'Gilderoy.' Glasgow, Carlisle, the Lincoln, York, and Worcester circuits, and Manchester, Birmingham, Bath, and Bristol saw him in leading business in comedy. In Manchester he first enacted Sir Peter Teazle.

Chippendale spent 17 years at Price's Park Theatre in New York.

Chippendale returned to the United Kingdom in 1853, performing at the Haymarket Theatre for over two decades, and took the role of Polonius in the Henry Irving production of Hamlet at the Lyceum.

He was on 27 April 1853, the first Lord Betterton in R. Sullivan's 'Elopement in High Life.' Many new parts in pieces now consigned to oblivion followed. On 23 Feb. 1860 he was first Colepepper in the 'Overland Route.' As Abel Murcott in 'Our American Cousin' he made a great hit. He was on 14 Jan. 1869 the first Dorrison in Robertson's 'Home,' and on 25 Oct. the first Marmaduke Vavasour in Tom Taylor's 'New Men and Old Acres.'

His chief service to the Haymarket was rendered in so-called classical comedy, in which he to some extent replaced Farren. His parts in this included, in addition to those named—Sir Francis Gripe in the 'Busybody,' Sullen in the 'Beaux' Stratagem,' Malvolio, Adam, Sir Harcourt Courtly, Hardcastle, Old Mirabel in the 'Inconstant,' Lord Duberly in The Heir at Law, Lord Priory in 'Wives as they were and Maids as they are,' Old Dornton in 'Road to Ruin,' and Sir Walter Fondlove in The Love Chase. His original parts comprised also Ingot in 'David Garrick,' Dr. Vivian in 'A Lesson for Life,' and Gervais Dumont in 'A Hero of Romance.' On tour at the Theatre Royal, Dundee in The School For Scandal his Sir Peter Teazle, opposite Miss Caroline Hill's Lady Teazle, was described as "a pure and perfectly chrysalis experience of dramatic art, exquisitely complete in every, even the minutest, shade of delineation".

As Polonius, he took a farewell benefit at the same company on 24 February 1879. He subsequently acted in the country until his intellect began to fail.

His third wife was a fellow Haymarket actor, the actress Mary Jane Seaman. Chippendale had twenty-three children, most of whom predeceased him.

He died on 3 January 1888 and was buried on the western side of Highgate Cemetery. His grave (no.13555) no longer has a headstone or marker.
