= Charles Healy Ditson =

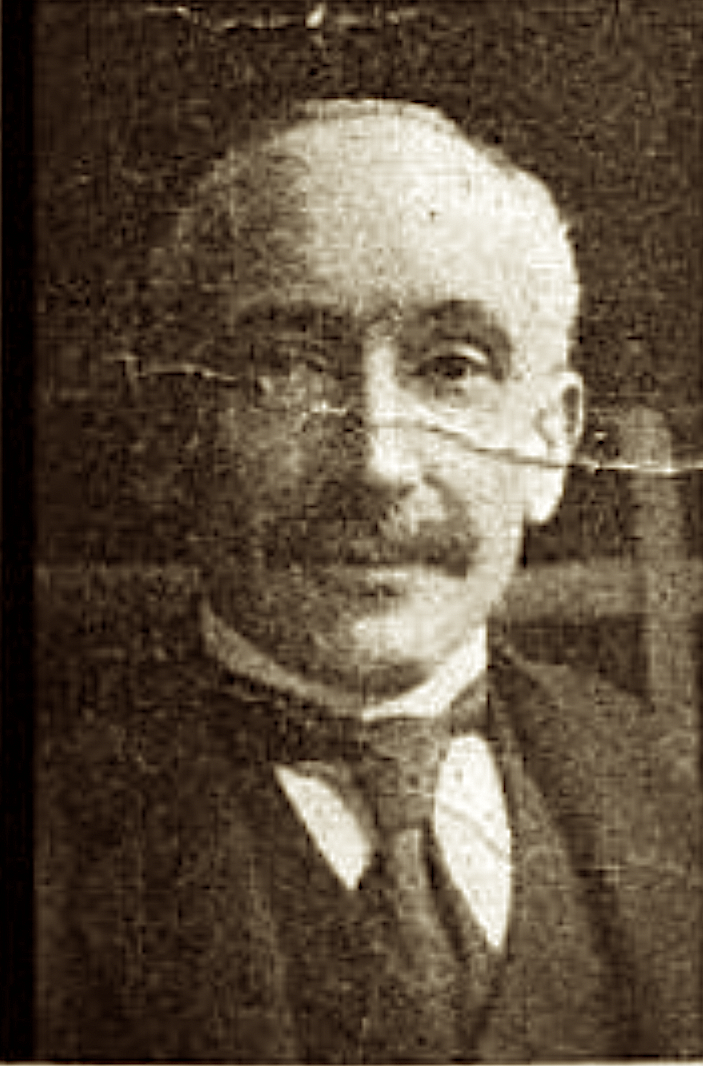
Charles Healy Ditson

Charles Healy Ditson (11 August 1845 – 14 May 1929) was an American music publisher. The son of Boston music publisher Oliver Ditson, he began his career working for Oliver Ditson & Co. (ODC) in 1865. In 1867 he was appointed head of the ODC's newly created New York City branch which was named C. H. Ditson & Co. Under his leadership it became the largest music publishing firm in the United States during the late 19th and early 20th centuries. After his father's death in 1888, Charles became treasurer of ODC, and later served as ODC's president from 1907 until his death in 1929.

== Life and career ==
The son of music publisher Oliver Ditson and his wife Catherine Ditson (nee Delano), Charles Healy Ditson was born in Boston, Massachusetts on 11 August 1845. His father's ancestors were of Scottish origin, and came to Plymouth Colony not long after its founding in order to escape religious persecution. His mother was a descendant of William Bradford, a Governor of Plymouth Colony. He was educated at The English High School. After completing his education in Boston he went to Europe for a period before returning to the United States to work for his father's firm in 1865.

Charles's father founded the Boston music publishing firm Oliver Ditson & Co. in 1835, and in 1867 his father placed Charles in charge of a newly established New York City branch of this firm, named C. H. Ditson & Company. Under his leadership it became the largest music publishing house in that era of American history. This was partly done through acquisitions, with Charles purchasing the music publishers William Hall & Son in 1875 and J. L. Peters in 1877. The firm relocated to several different addresses and built a series of buildings as it grew and its need for larger premises became prescient.

In 1888 Oliver Ditson died, and at that time Charles Ditson was appointed treasurer of Oliver Ditson & Co. He later became president of the company in 1907; a post he held until his death. On 7 October 1890 he married Alice M. Tappin of New York City.

He died in New York City on 14 May 1929 at the age of 84.
