= Women in music =

Women in music have occupied many roles in the art over the centuries and have been responsible for a multitude of contributions, shaping movements, genres, and trends as singers, songwriters, composers, instrumental performers, and educators, and in behind-the-scenes roles. At the same time, however, many roles in music have been closed to or not encouraged for women. There has been growing awareness of this since perhaps the 1960s, and doors have been opening.

Women's music refers to music created by and directed towards women. It may explore political and social topics, influencing and impacting creativity, activism, and culture.

== Western composers ==
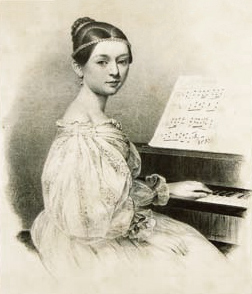
Nineteenth-century composer and pianist Clara Schumann

Few works by women composers are part of standard classical music repertoire. In the Concise Oxford History of Music, for example, Clara Schumann is one of the only women composers mentioned.

=== Medieval Era ===
"O frondens virga"
From Hildegarde von Bingen's Ordo Virtutum

During the Medieval Era, most art music was created for liturgical (or otherwise religious) purposes. Due to views about the roles of women held by religious leaders, few women composed this type of music, with exceptions such as Hildegard von Bingen.

Von Bingen (1098–1179), a German Benedictine abbess, was a composer, writer, and philosopher. One of her works as a writer and composer, the Ordo Virtutum (Order of the Virtues), is an early example of liturgical drama and an early morality play. Seventy-seven of her sequences, each with its own original poetic text, survive, one of the largest repertoires among medieval composers.

She also composed many liturgical songs that were collected into a cycle called the Symphonia armoniae celestium revelationum (Symphony of the harmony of heavenly revelations). The songs from the Symphonia are set to her own text and range from antiphons, hymns, and sequences to responsories. Her music is described as monophonic, using melodies that pushed the boundaries of traditional Gregorian chant.

=== Renaissance Era ===
Two Renaissance women in music stand out as particularly of note: Maddalena Casulana and Caterina Assandra, both Italian.

==== Maddalena Casulana ====
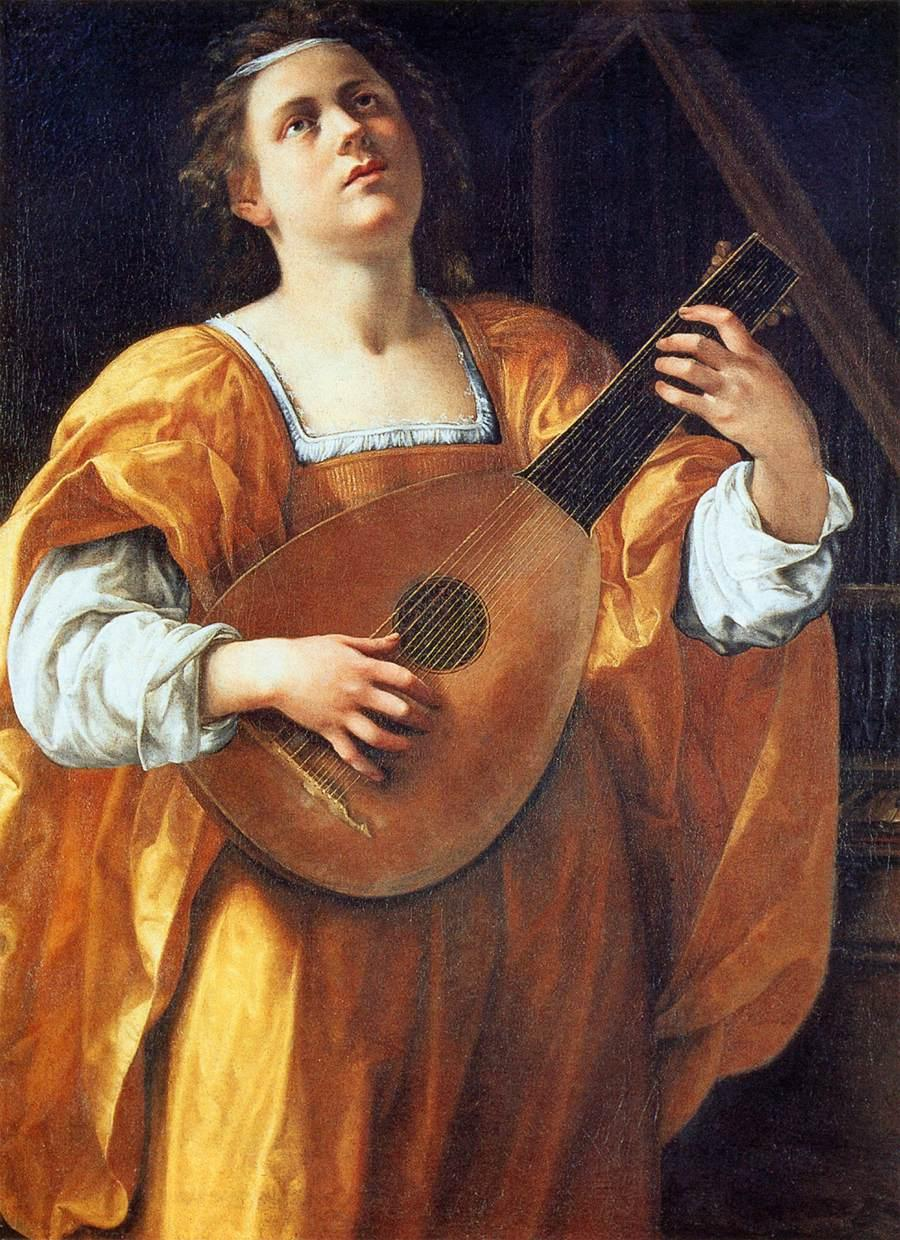
Painting by Artemisia Gentileschi, representing Saint Cecilia, patron saint of music—which has become identified since 2010 with Italian composer Maddalena Casulana, considered the first woman composer to have her music printed and published (Note: This painting by Artemisia Gentileschi, representing Saint Cecilia, has become identified with Maddalena Casulana since 2010. However, there is no evidence that it is actually a portrait of Casulana.)

Maddalena Casulana (1544–1590) was an Italian composer, lutenist, and singer. In Venice, her book of madrigals for four voices, Il primo libro di madrigali (The first book of madrigals), was the first printed and published work by a woman in Western music history. In the dedication, she wrote about her feelings as a woman composer: "[I] want to show the world, as much as I can in this profession of music, the vain error of men that they alone possess the gifts of intellect and artistry, and that such gifts are never given to women." Other composers of the time, such as Philippe de Monte, thought highly of her.

==== Caterina Assandra ====
Caterina Assandra (1590–1618) was an Italian composer and Benedictine nun. She was also an organist and published various works, composing motets and organ pieces. Her motet O Salutaris Hostia (O Saving Victim), included in Motetti (Motets) op. 2, was one of the first pieces to include the violone.

=== Baroque Era ===
Baroque women musicians of note include Francesca Cacchini and Barbara Strozzi (Italian) and Élisabeth Jacquet de La Guerre (French).

==== Francesca Caccini ====
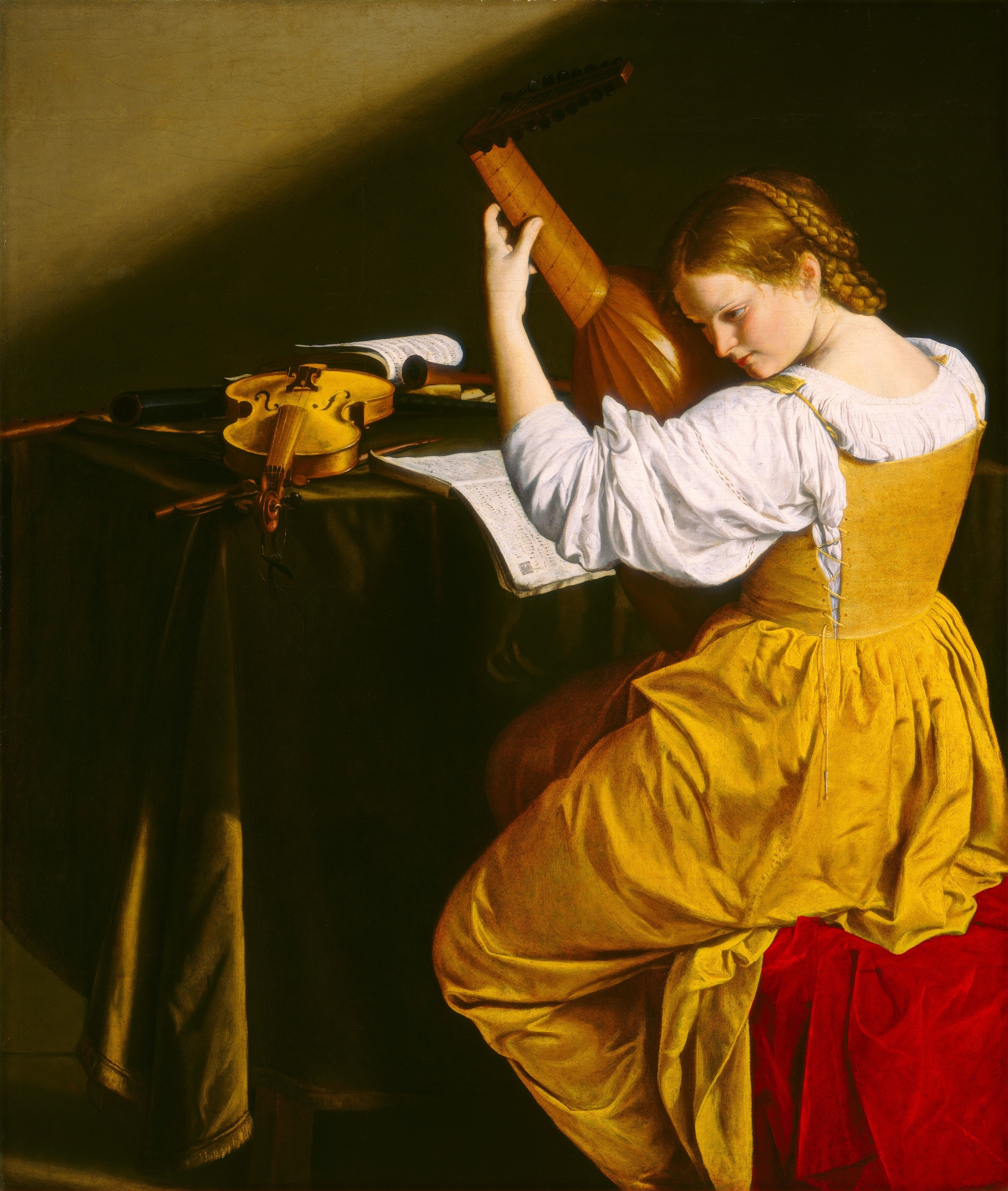
The Lute Player, by Orazio Gentileschi, presumed to be a portrait of Italian composer Francesca Caccini

Francesca Caccini (1587–1641) was an Italian composer, singer, lutenist, poet, and music teacher. When she sang at the wedding of Henry IV of France and Maria de Medici in 1600, Henry praised her as "the best singer ever heard in France."In her native country, she worked in the Medici court as a teacher, chamber singer, rehearsal coach, and composer of both chamber and stage music.

==== Barbara Strozzi ====
Barbara Strozzi (1619–1677) was an Italian Baroque composer and singer. Renowned for her poetic ability and compositional talent, Strozzi was said to be "the most prolific composer—man or woman—of printed secular vocal music in Venice in the middle of the century."

==== Élisabeth Jacquet de La Guerre ====
Élisabeth Jacquet de La Guerre (1665–1729) was a French composer, musician, and harpsichordist. Born into a family of musicians and master instrument-makers, she was a child prodigy and performed on the harpsichord before King Louis XIV. She became a musician in the Royal Court and taught, composed, and gave concerts at home and throughout Paris. One of the few well-known women composers of her time, she composed in a wide variety of musical forms. Her talent and achievements were acknowledged by Titon du Tillet, who noted her accomplishments in Parnasse francois—a biographical collection paying tribute to poets and musicians of the era.

=== Classical Era ===
The Classical Era produced quite a number of Western women in music in various countries, including Maria Teresa Agnesi (Italy), Princess Anna Amalia (Prussia), Elisabeth Olin (Sweden), Henriette Adélaïde Villard de Beaumesnil (France), Marianne von Martínez (Austria), and Harriet Abrams and Jane Mary Guest (England). Several also played instruments—such as Princess Anna Amalia, Henriette Adélaïde Villard de Beaumesnil, and Jane Mary Guest—or sang, such as Elisabeth Olin and Harriett Abrams. Maria Teresa Agnesi and Marianne von Martínez did both in addition to composing.

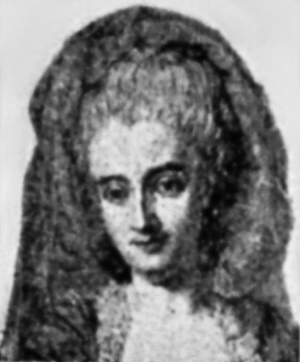
Swedish opera singer and composer Elisabeth Olin in the 1780s

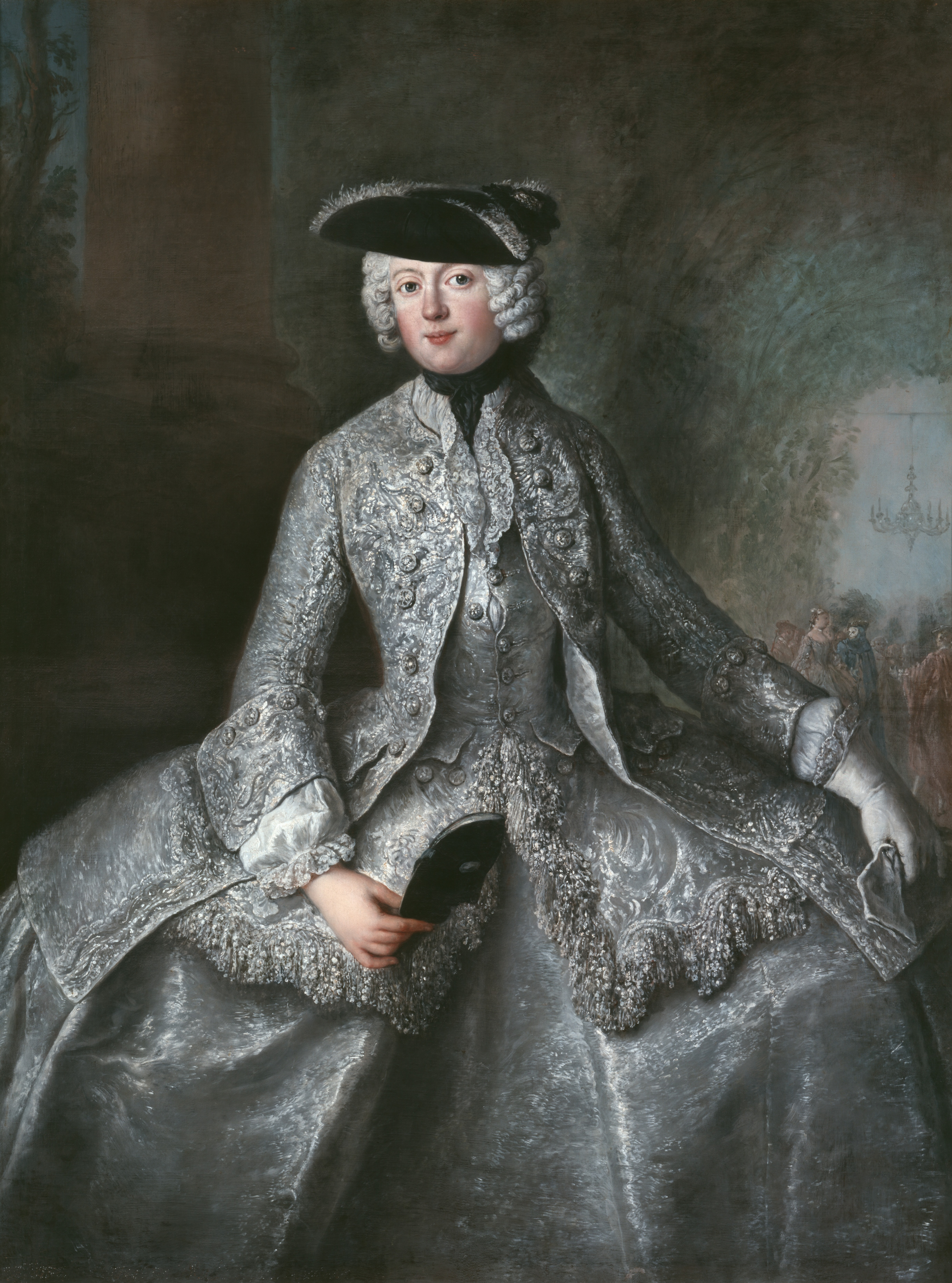
Princess Anna Amalia, a Prussian composer and score curator known for her chamber works—including trios, marches, cantatas, songs, and fugues

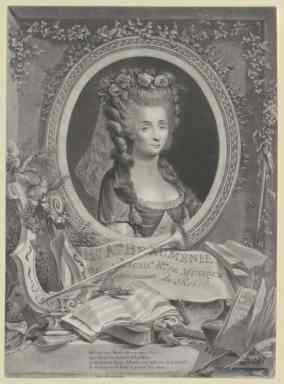
French composer and opera singer Henriette Adélaïde Villard de Beaumesnil

Maria Teresa Agnesi (1720–1795) was an Italian composer, harpsichordist, and singer. She was notable for composing multiple works of opera seria and chamber music. Her career was made possible by her patron, Habsburg Empress Maria Theresa of Vienna. Her portrait hangs in La Scala opera house.

Princess Anna Amalia (1723–1787) was a Prussian composer. She learned to play the harpsichord, flute, and violin at a young age. She became the abbess of Quedlinburg in 1755. She achieved fame as a composer and is known for her smaller chamber works, including trios, marches, cantatas, songs, and fugues. She was also a curator and collector of music scores, preserving over 600 volumes of works by composers Johann Sebastian Bach, George Frideric Handel, Georg Philipp Telemann, Karl Heinrich Graun, and Carl Philipp Emanuel Bach.

Elisabeth Olin (1740–1828) was a Swedish opera singer and composer. She became a vocalist in regular public concerts at the Riddarhuset (House of Nobility) in Stockholm. She was the prima donna of the Swedish opera for a decade. In 1773, she became the first woman to be granted the title Hovsångare (court singer), and in 1782 she was inducted as the first women member into the Royal Swedish Academy of Music.

Henriette Adélaïde Villard de Beaumesnil (1748–1813) was a French composer and opera singer. She began working in minor comedy roles at age seven and debuted as a soloist at the Paris Opera in 1766. She was the second woman to have a composition performed at the Paris Opéra. (Jacquet de la Guerre is thought to be the first.)

Marianne von Martínez (1744–1812) was an Austrian composer, singer and pianist. Metastasio noticed her precocious talents and came to oversee her musical education, which included keyboard lessons from Haydn, singing lessons with Porpora, and composition lessons with Johann Adolph Hasse and imperial court composer Giuseppe Bonno. She played for the imperial court, where she gained attention for her voice and keyboard playing, and was frequently asked to perform before Empress Maria Theresa.

Harriett Abrams (1758–1821) was an English composer and soprano. As a singer, she was praised for her performances of George Frideric Handel's work. She studied singing, music theory, and composition with composer Thomas Arne before making her opera début in 1775 at the Theatre Royal in London. She became a principal singer at London concerts and provincial festivals, appearing regularly from 1780 to 1790.

Jane Mary Guest (1762–1846) was an English composer and pianist. A pupil of Johann Christian Bach and initially composing in the galante style, She composed keyboard sonatas, other keyboard works, and vocal works with keyboard accompaniment. She was the piano teacher of Princess Amelia of the UK and Princess Charlotte of Wales.

=== Romantic era ===
In the Romantic Era, the Polish Maria Szymanowska and Germans Fanny Hensel and Clara Schumann won much renown.

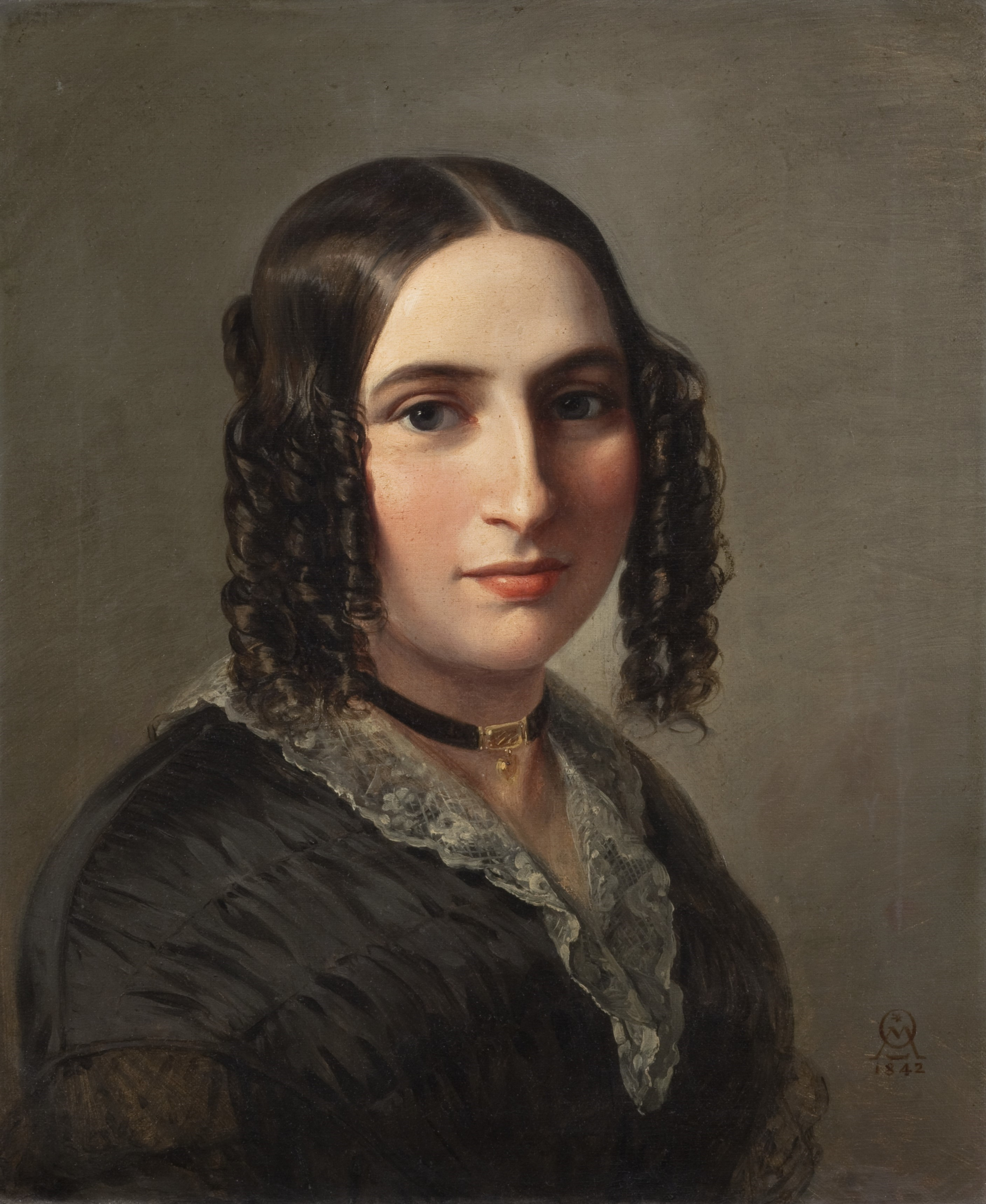
Painting of German composer Fanny Hensel, by Moritz Daniel Oppenheim, 1842

==== Maria Szymanowska ====
Maria Szymanowska (1789–1831) was a well-known Polish composer and pianist. She maintained connections with other notable artists, including Gioacchino Rossini, Johann Wolfgang von Goethe, and Adam Mickiewicz. She was most acclaimed for her performance skills, called “the charming Allmighty of Sound” and “the Queen of tones." As a composer, she is considered a precursor to Frédéric Chopin, since she was most lauded for her piano miniatures.

==== Fanny Hensel ====
Fanny Hensel (1805–1847) was one of the best-known women composers of the 1800s. She showed prodigious musical ability and began to compose as a child. Even though family visitors were equally impressed by Fanny and her brother Felix Mendelssohn, Fanny was limited by the attitudes of the time. Her father was tolerant, rather than supportive, of her activities. He wrote to her in 1820, telling her that "music will perhaps become his [i.e., Felix's] profession, while for you it can and must be only an ornament." Felix also cautioned her against publishing under her own name, commenting about her:

From my knowledge of Fanny I should say that she has neither inclination nor vocation for [musical] authorship. She is too much all that a woman ought to be for this. She regulates her house, and neither thinks of the public nor of the musical world, nor even of music at all, until her first duties are fulfilled. Publishing would only disturb her in these, and I cannot say that I approve of it.

==== Clara Schumann ====
Clara Schumann (1819–1896) was a German composer and concert pianist who had a 61-year concert career. From an early age, she had a one-hour lesson in piano, violin, singing, theory, harmony, composition, and counterpoint. In 1830, at age 11, she had become a skilled soloist, and she left on a concert tour of European cities. In the late 1830s, she performed to sell-out crowds and glowing reviews. Frédéric Chopin described her playing to Franz Liszt, who came to hear one of her concerts and subsequently "praised her extravagantly" in a letter published in the Parisian Revue et Gazette Musicale. She was named a Königliche und Kaiserliche Kammervirtuosin (Royal and Imperial Chamber Virtuoso), Austria's highest musical honor.

She was also instrumental in changing the kind of programs expected of concert pianists. In her early career, she played what was then customary, mainly bravura pieces designed to showcase her technique, often in the form of arrangements or variations on popular themes from operas, written by virtuosos such as Thalberg, Herz, or Henselt. As it was also customary to play one's own compositions, she included at least one of her own works in every program, works such as her "Variations on a Theme by Bellini" (Op. 8) and her popular "Scherzo" (Op. 10). Her works include songs, piano pieces, a piano concerto, a piano trio, choral pieces, and three Romances for violin and piano.

==== Others ====
Additional women composers are listed below by birth year, along with their nationalities. Some were also performers; for example, Agnes Tyrrell and Louise Farrenc were noted pianists. For a full list, see List of female composers by birth year.

- Agnes Tyrrell (1846–1883; English and Czech)
- Louise Farrenc (1804-1875; French)
- Teresa Carreño (1853-1917; Venezuelan)
- Pauline Viardot Garcia (1821-1910; Spanish)

=== Modern Era ===
==== Katherine Hoover ====
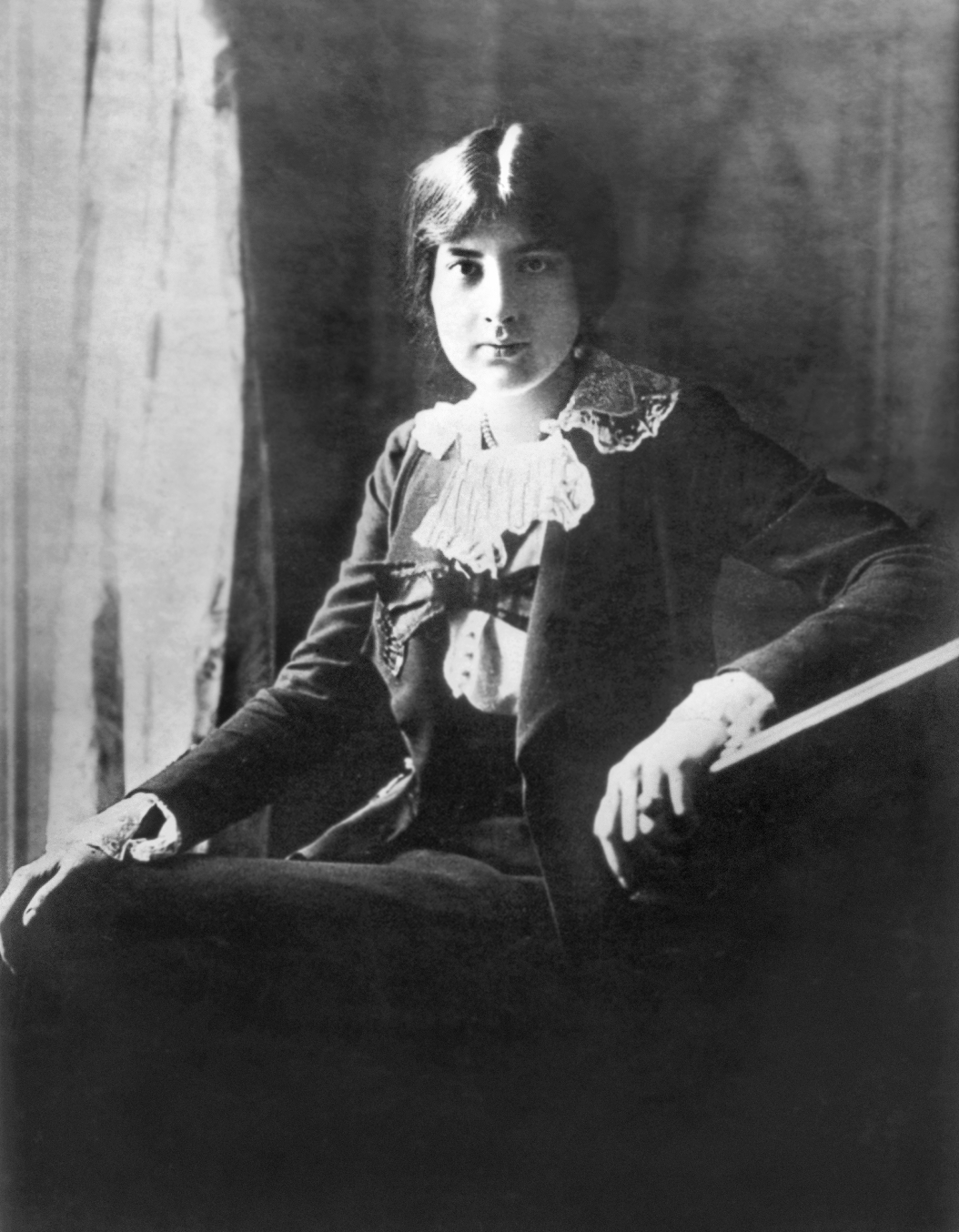
French composer Lili Boulanger

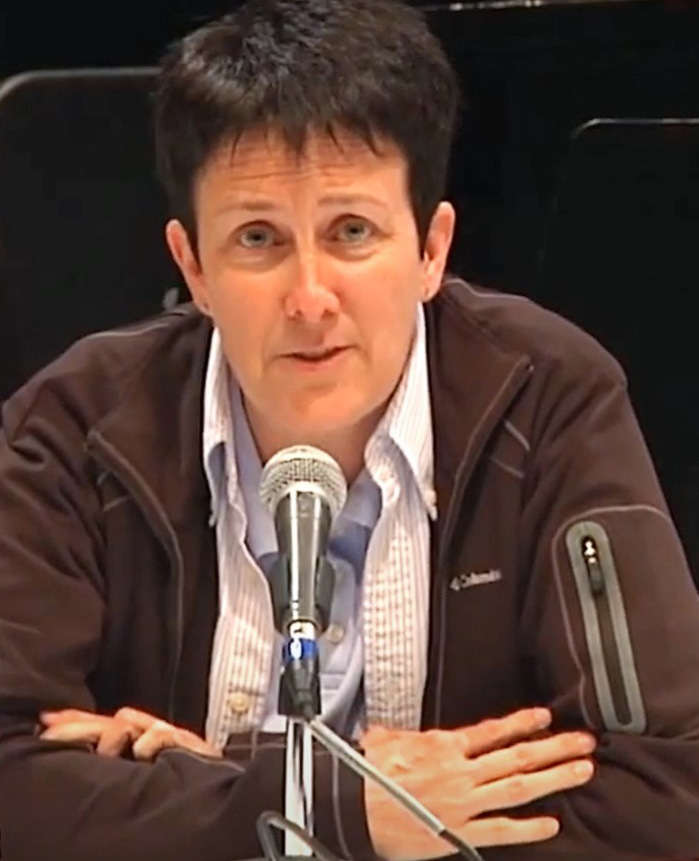
American composer Jennifer Higdon, whose compositions have won a Pulitzer Prize for Music and multiple Grammy Awards

Katherine Hoover (1937–2018) studied music at the University of Rochester and the Eastman School of Music, where she earned a Performance Certificate in Flute and a Bachelor's of Music in Music Theory in 1959. She started publishing compositions in 1965, with her Duet for Two Violins. Hoover was the winner of the National Flute Association's Newly Published Music Competition twice, first in 1987 with Medieval Suite and again in 1991 with Kokopelli for solo flute. These pieces use many extended techniques for flute, such as pitch bending. Many of her works have been recorded by other renowned musicians and performed in Carnegie Hall.

==== Joan Tower ====
Joan Tower (born 1938) wrote the 1976 piece Black Topaz, which features many tonal melodies and harmonies. She received her Doctor of Musical Arts degree in composition from Columbia University in 1978. She was commissioned in 1979 by the American Composers Orchestra, resulting in her first orchestral work, Sequoia, which has been performed worldwide. From 1985 to 1988 Tower was the composer-in-residence at the St. Louis Symphony. In 1990 she was the first woman to win the Grawemeyer Award for Music Composition, which included a $150,000 prize. Since then, Tower has been the composer-in-residence at numerous music festivals, including the Norfolk Chamber Music Festival and the Tanglewood Contemporary Music Festival. Tower has been a professor of music at Bard College in New York since 1982 and is considered one of the most influential woman composers of the 20th century.

==== Ellen Taaffe Zwilich ====
Ellen Taaffe Zwilich (born 1939) was the first woman to receive a doctorate in composition from Juilliard. The same year, she won a gold medal at the International Composition Competition in Italy. In 1983 Zwilich made history again, becoming the first woman to win the Pulitzer Prize for Music for Symphony No. 1. She received many commissions, and her piece Millennium has been performed by dozens of orchestras since its premiere in 2000. She became the Francis Eppes Professor of Music at Florida State University in 1999. Zwilich is known for her "eclectic millennial voice" in her compositions, utilizing a clear design and rich timbres. Though her music, which was influenced by the Second Viennese School, was originally dissonant, her style became more emotional after the death of her husband.

==== LIbby Larsen ====
Libby Larsen (born 1950) earned a Master of Music in 1975 and a PhD in 1978 from the University of Minnesota. In 1973 she co-founded the Minnesota Composers Forum (later the American Composers Forum), and was the composer-in-residence at the Minnesota Orchestra from 1983 to 1987. A composer of over 220 works, including orchestra, dance, opera, choral, theater, chamber, and solo repertoire, her pieces have been performed across the United States and Europe. Larsen is a strong supporter of contemporary music and female musicians. She won a Grammy Award for her CD The Art of Arleen Auger in 1994 and a Lifetime Achievement Award from the American Academy of Arts and Letters in 2000. She also published a book, The Concert Hall That Fell Asleep and Woke Up as a Car Radio in 2007.

==== Jennifer Higdon ====
Jennifer Higdon (born 1962) earned an MA and PhD from the University of Philadelphia in 1994. Higdon has received awards from the Guggenheim Foundation, American Academy of Arts and Letters, International League of Women Composers, and others. Her 1996 work Shine was named Best Contemporary Piece by USA Today. Of Higdon's many pieces, blue cathedral is most frequently performed. In 2010, she won the Grammy award for Best Contemporary Classical Composition for her Percussion Concerto and the Pulitzer Prize for Music for her composition Violin Concerto, premiered by Hilary Hahn.

==== Others ====
Additional women composers are listed below by birth year, along with their nationalities. Some were also performers; for example, Amy Beach, and Verdina Shlonsky were noted pianists. For a full list, see List of female composers by birth year.

- Ethel Smyth (1858–1944; British)
- Amy Beach (1867–1944; American)
- Dora Pejačević (1885–1923; Croatian)
- Florence Price (1887–1953; American)
- Nadia Boulanger (1887–1979; French)
- Lili Boulanger (1893–1918; French)
- Verdina Shlonsky (1905–1990; Israeli)
- Imogen Holst (1907–1984; English)
- Violet Archer (1913–2000; Canadian)
- Vítězslava Kaprálová (1915–1940; Czech)
- Thea Musgrave (1928–; Scottish)
- Sofia Gubaidulina (1931–2025; Russian)

== Songwriters ==
=== 19th century-early 20th century ===
Female songwriters of popular music in the late 19th and early 20th century were often dismissed because of a cultural expectation that women should only perform music, not create it, according to Richard A. Reublin and Richard G. Beil, who called this a "glaring and embarrassing omission in our musical heritage." For instance, Chicago music critic George P. Upton argued that "women lacked the innate creativity to compose good music" due to what he referred to as their biological predisposition. Some forms of musical entertainment were overwhelmingly male dominated throughout this time period: About 95% of the songwriters and 70% of the singers in the British music hall during the early 1900s were men.

However, the advent of parlor music "allowed for women to perform and compose music for intimate settings as a form of domestic responsibility." In the mid-19th century, women songwriters emerged, including Faustina Hasse Hodges, Susan McFarland Parkhurst, Augusta Browne, and Marion Dix Sullivan.

- Carrie Jacobs-Bond (1862-1946) was the preeminent woman composer from the late 1900s into the middle of the 20th century. She was the first woman to own a music publishing firm, and her most famous song, "A Perfect Day" sold five million sheet music copies.
- Maude Nugent (1877–1958) wrote "Sweet Rosie O'Grady" in 1896 as well as "My Irish Daisy," and "I Haven't Been in New York Very Long."
- Charlotte Blake (1885–1979) was a staff writer for the Whitney Warner Publishing Co., in Detroit, Michigan. Initially, the company billed her as "C. Blake," but by 1906 advertisements used her full name.
- Caro Roma (1866–1937) was the stage name of Carrie Northey, one of Tin Pan Alley era's most popular and well-known early musicians. Her songs include "Can't Yo' Heah Me Calling," "Faded Rose," "The Angelus," "Thinking of Thee," and "Resignation."

=== Jazz ===
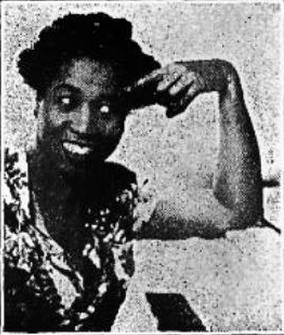
Lil Hardin Armstrong (1898–1971)

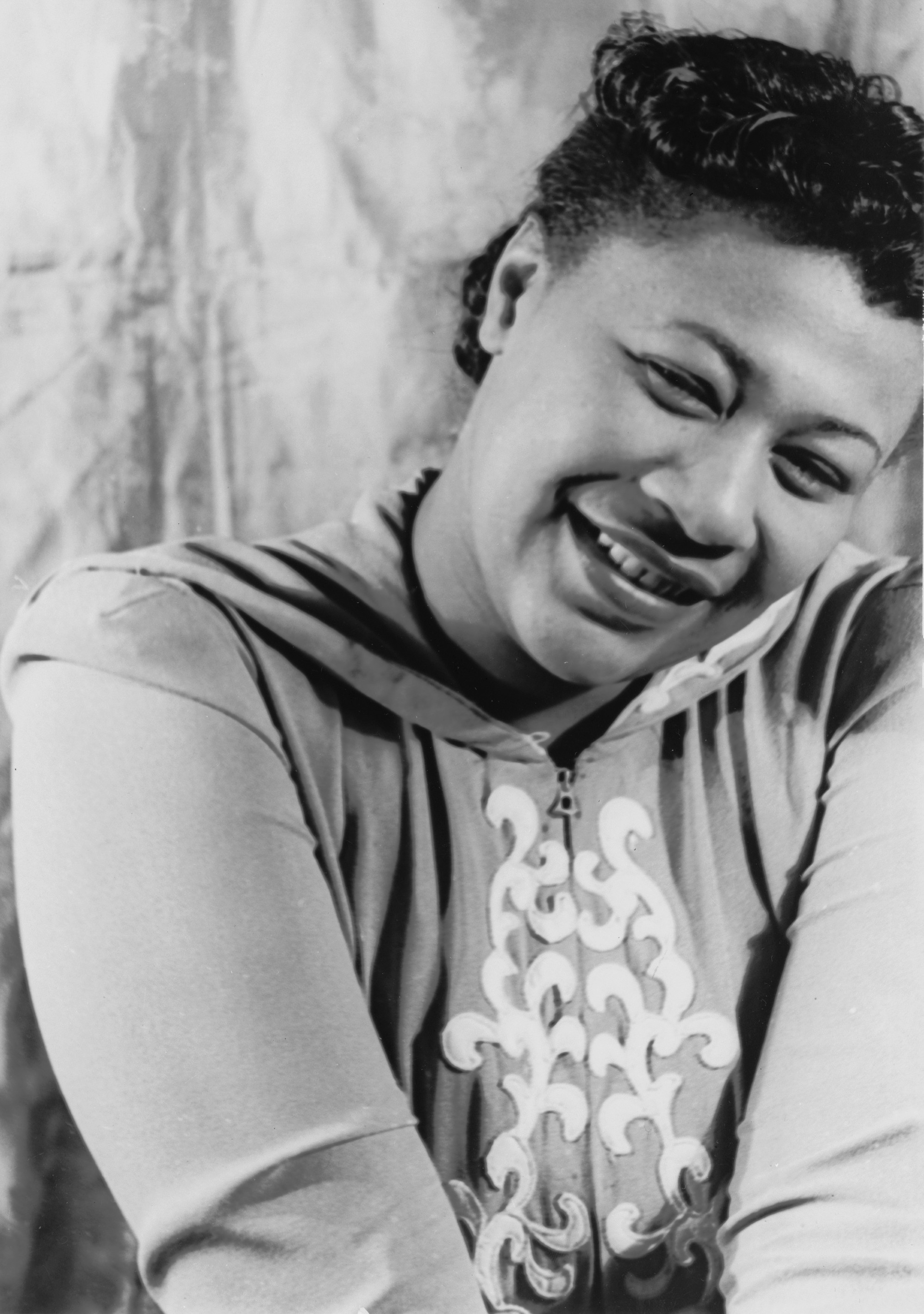
Ella Fitzgerald in 1940

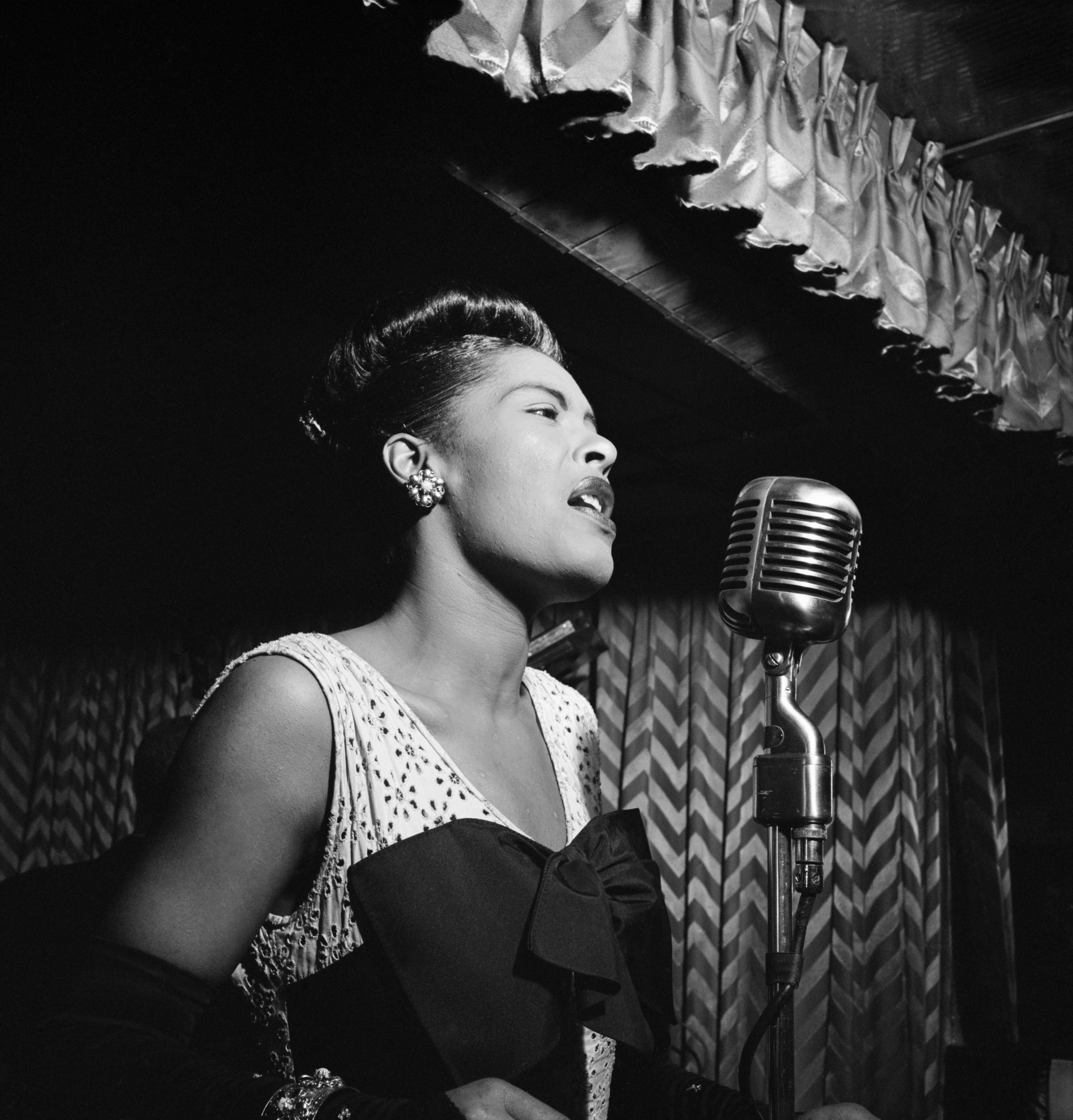
Billie Holiday in 1947

Examples of women in 20th-century jazz

While jazz songwriting has long been a male-dominated field, woman jazz songwriters—including Ann Ronell, Irene Higginbotham, Dorothy Fields, Lil Hardin Armstrong, and Billie Holiday—also achieved success.

Women influenced jazz music by producing, composing, and performing it. One early influential woman was Bessie Smith ("Empress of the Blues"). A Rock and Roll Hall of Fame inductee, she was awarded a Grammy Lifetime Achievement Award in 1989. Another woman who made history in the jazz industry is Dolly Jones, the first women jazz trumpeter to be recorded. Women such as Billie Pierce, Lovie Austin, Jeanette Kimball, Mary Lou Williams, Alice Coltrane, and Hazel Scott all had an impact on the jazz genre.

Women often began their careers playing in an all-women's jazz group, such as Valaida Snow, known as the "Queen of the Trumpet," and Nona Hendryx, a jazz vocalist and multi-instrumentalist.

World War II opened many doors for woman artists. However, once the men came home from war, female jazz musicians faced difficulties such as sexual harassment and harsh criticism.

=== Popular music in the 1960s ===
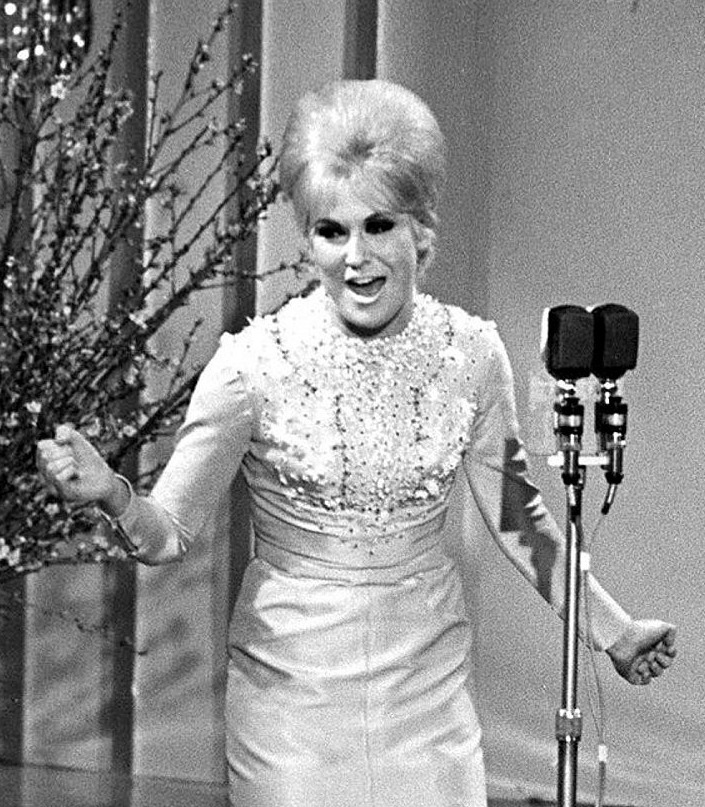
Dusty Springfield in 1965

[l]ike most aspects of the... music business [in the 1960s], songwriting was a male-dominated field. Though there were plenty of female singers on the radio, women... were primarily seen as consumers:... Singing was sometimes an acceptable pastime for a girl, but playing an instrument, writing songs, or producing records simply wasn't done... [and women] were not socialized to see themselves as people who create [music].

— Erika Abrams in Rebeat, 28 January 2015

In the 1960s pop music scene, women were mostly singers. A few women wrote songs at the Brill Building in New York City, considered the center of the American music industry that dominated the pop charts at this time—among them, Carole King, Ellie Greenwich, and Cynthia Weil—penning iconic hits for other artists.

=== Singer-songwriters ===
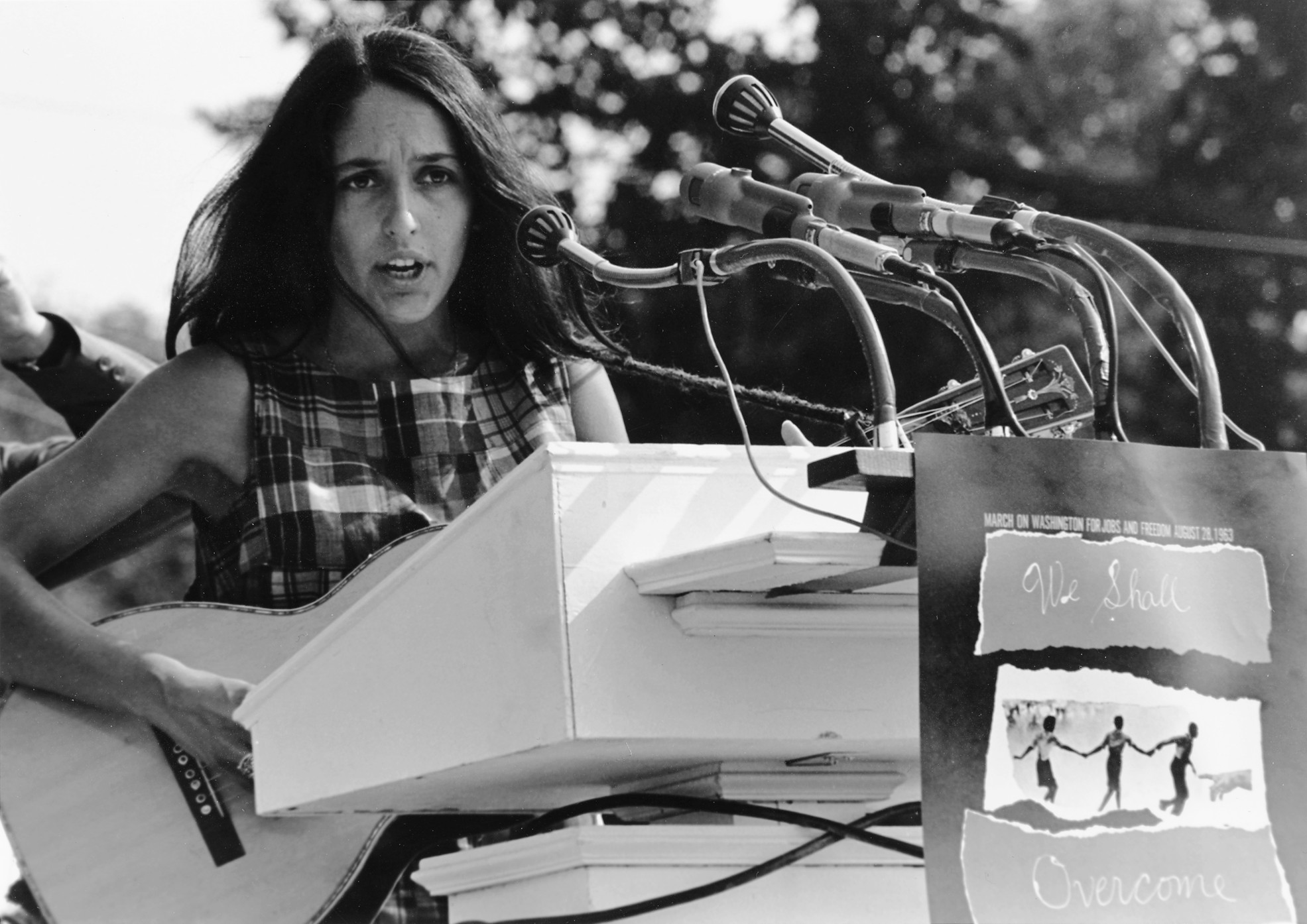
Joan Baez playing at the March on Washington in August 1963

Women were well represented in the late 1960s success of singer-songwriters who wrote in the confessional style of poets such as Anne Sexton and Sylvia Plath.

Songwriters such as Joni Mitchell wanted to escape categories of race and gender and be seen simply as artists, as she explained in a 1994 interview during which she pointed out discrimination, sex-based exclusion, and gratuitous sexualization, although she also rejected feminism.

Carole King, after stellar early success as a songwriter, sang her pieces on one of the most successful albums of the period, Tapestry, which sold over 15 million copies. She challenged conventions around dating, marriage, and sex, promoting casual relationships and highlighting the notion of friendship with those of the opposite sex with her hit song "You've Got a Friend." In 2013, she was the first women recipient (and fifth overall) of the Gershwin Prize for Popular Song.

Carole King, one of the most successful singer-songwriters, was included among Rolling Stone's 100 Greatest Songwriters of All Time and Songwriters Hall of Fame.

One-time model Grace Slick achieved notoriety for her role in San Francisco's burgeoning psychedelic music scene in the mid-1960s.

Other notable women singer-songwriters include:

- Dolly Parton, who has sole writing credit on over 700 songs and became the most successful female country artist of all time
- Elyse Weinberg
- Janis Ian
- Joni Mitchell
- Laura Marling
- Laura Nyro
- Loretta Lynn, who wrote songs on the political issues of white working-class women in America, including contraception and divorce and was awarded the Presidential Medal of Freedom in 2013
- Lotti Golden, known for songs about gender identity and drug use
- Melanie
- Rita Lee

=== Musical theatre ===
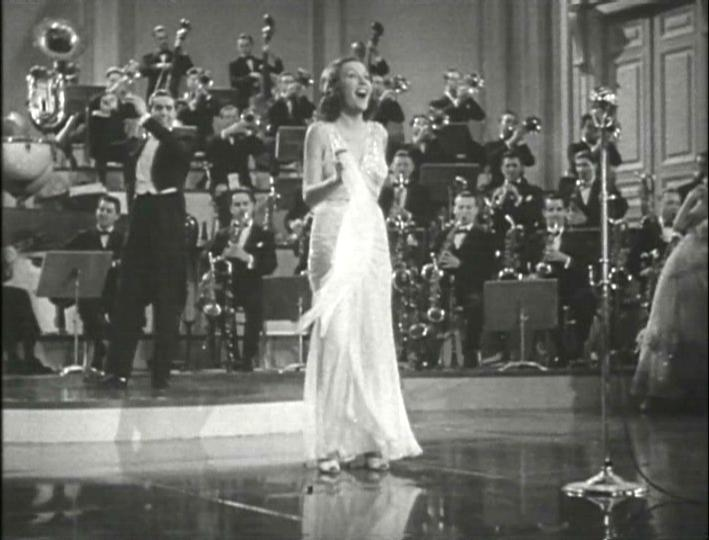
Ethel Merman Known as the "First Lady of Musical Theatre," Ethel Merman's powerful voice and larger-than-life presence graced many Broadway stages.

In musical theatre, woman songwriters are rare. In 2013, Cyndi Lauper was the first woman to win the Tony Award for Best Score without a male collaborator for the music and lyrics for Kinky Boots. In 2015 an all-woman writing team made history by winning the Tony Award for Best Score. Lisa Kron (Best Book), Jeanine Tesori and Kron (Best Original Score) won Best Score for Fun Home. Other woman songwriters include Lauren Pritchard, who wrote Songbird; Zoe Sarnak, who wrote A Lasting Impression and The Years Between; and Katie Thompson.

The gender imbalance in musical theater continues in the 21st century with women making up, as reported in 2019, only 3% of wind band composers and 12% of choral composers. Despite the scarcity of women in musical theater composition, over fifty women have received international recognition for composing musical scores for Broadway and Off-Broadway productions.

=== Black women ===
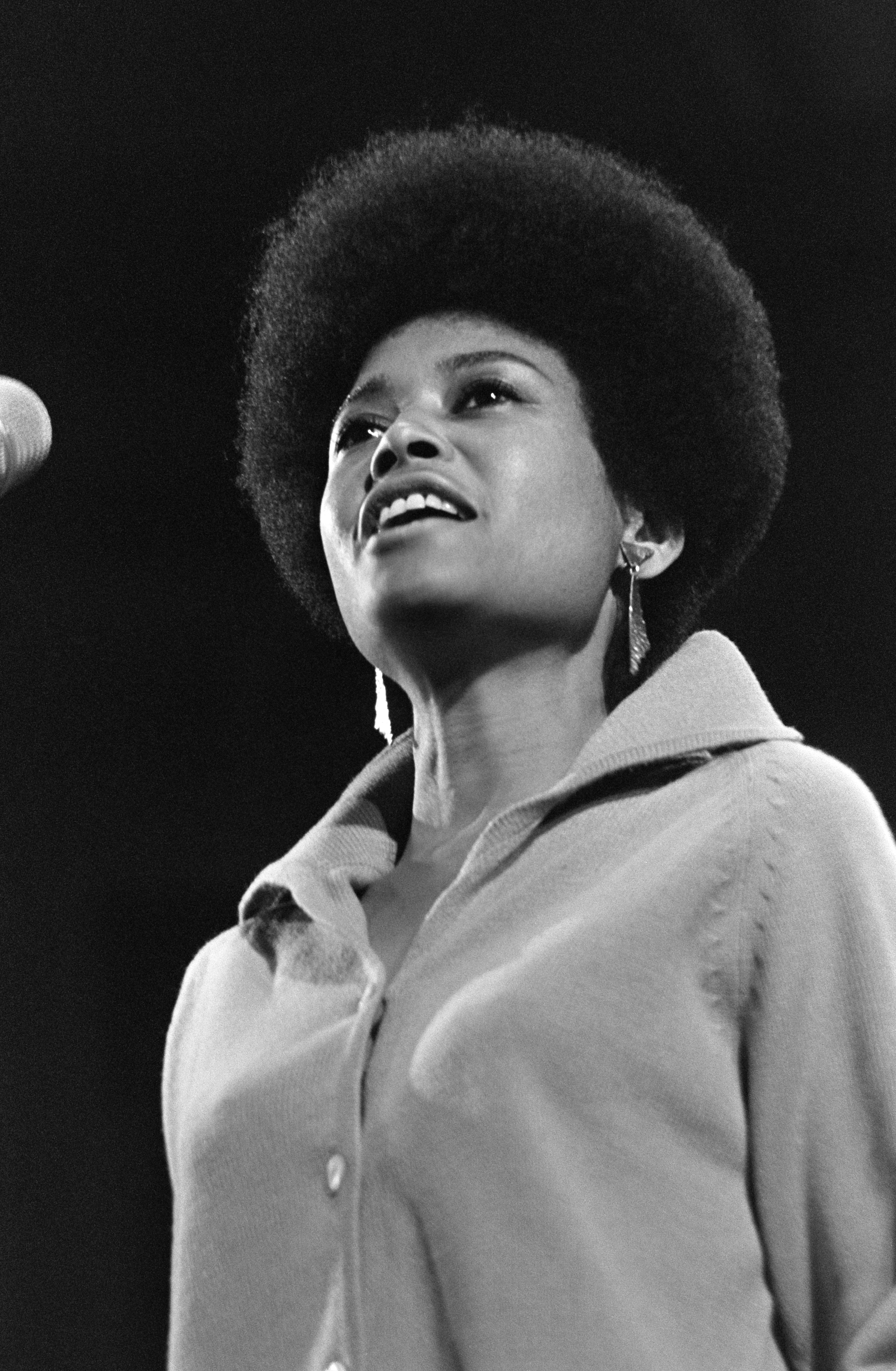
Abbey Lincoln (1930–2010), was an American jazz vocalist, songwriter, and actress, who wrote and performed her own compositions. She was a civil rights advocate during the 1960s.

Black women have made historical contributions to American music. Examples include jazz artist Billie Holiday; soul artists Aretha Franklin and Diana Ross; disco artists Donna Summer and Chaka Khan; and later singing artists such as Missy Elliott, Mariah Carey, Beyoncé, and Rihanna (although she is from Barbados). However, of the over 380 members of the Songwriters Hall of Fame, only Sylvia Moy and Valerie Simpson are black women, as reported in 2009.

== Instrumental performers ==
=== Popular music ===
==== Performers and bandleaders ====
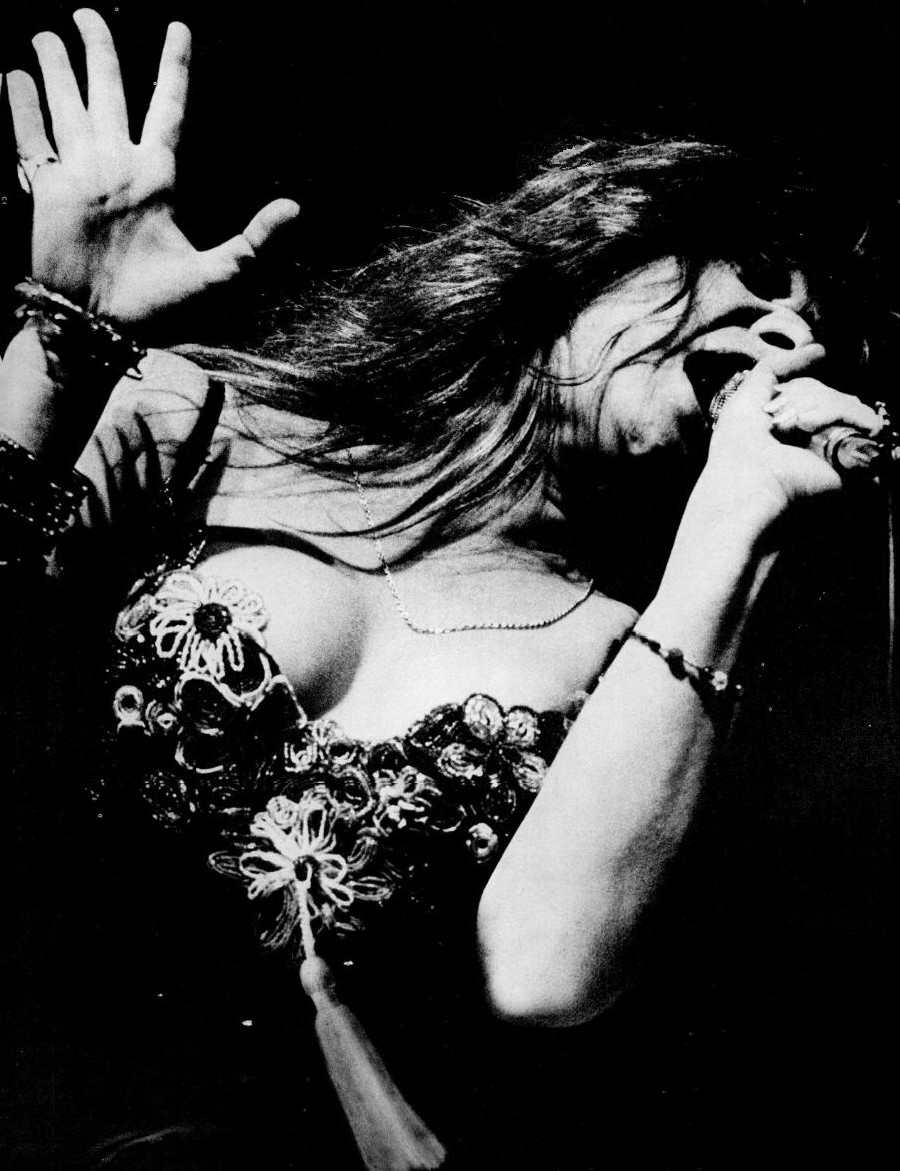
Janis Joplin, known for her mezzo-soprano vocals

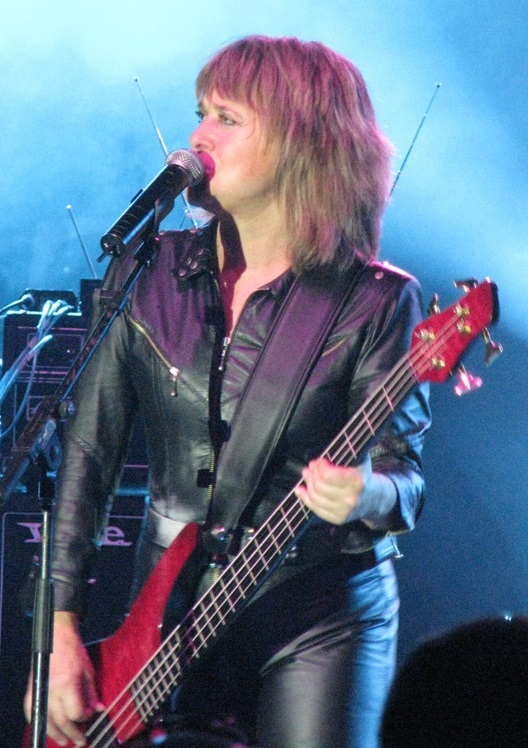
Suzi Quatro in 2007

Professional women instrumentalists were initially uncommon in rock music. One exception is women who played instruments in American all-female garage rock bands, although none of these bands achieved more than regional success. Heavy metal bands remained almost exclusively male at least until the mid-1980s, with a few exceptions such as Girlschool. When Suzi Quatro emerged in 1973, no other prominent woman rock musician worked as a singer, instrumentalist, songwriter, or bandleader.

Many artists both sang and composed songs, but these artists also played an instrument:

- Nancy Wilson
- Joan Jett
- Sister Rosetta Tharpe
- Lita Ford
- Tal Wilkenfeld
- Bonnie Raitt
- Joni Mitchell
- Kaki King
- Orianthi
- Jennifer Batten
- Mary Ford
- Carole King
- Rita Lee
- Shirley Horn
- Eva Cassidy
- Ruth Brown
- Marian Anderson
- Gunhild Carling (multi-instrumentalist)

==== Bands ====
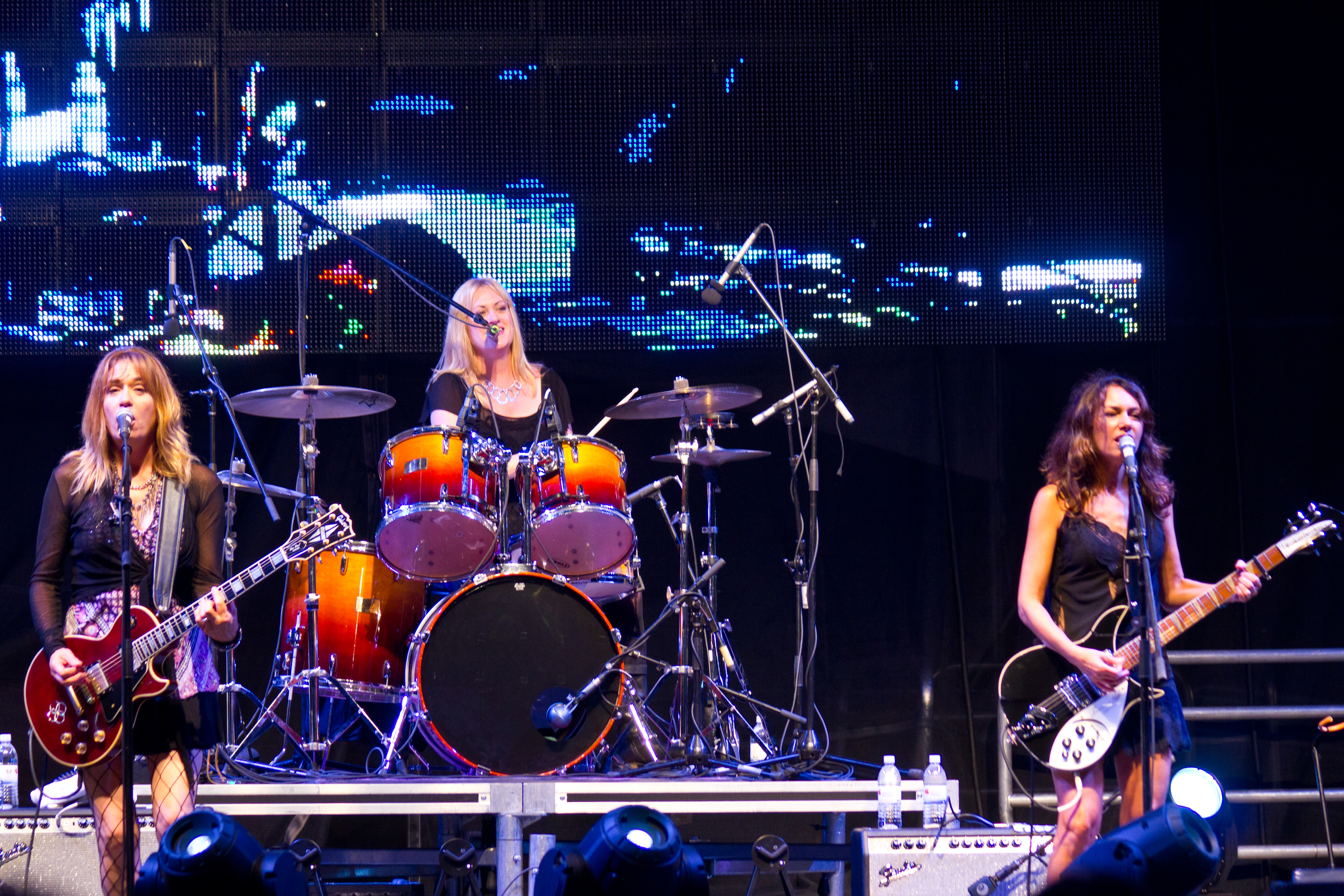
The Bangles, a prominent band in the 1980s pop-rock scene

An all-female band is a musical group in popular music genres such as rock, blues, and jazz composed of female musicians. All-female bands are sometimes also called "girl groups." They were difficult to maintain: many struggled with replacing female musicians once they departed, and some chose to open the bands to men to continue.

===== 1930s–1960s =====
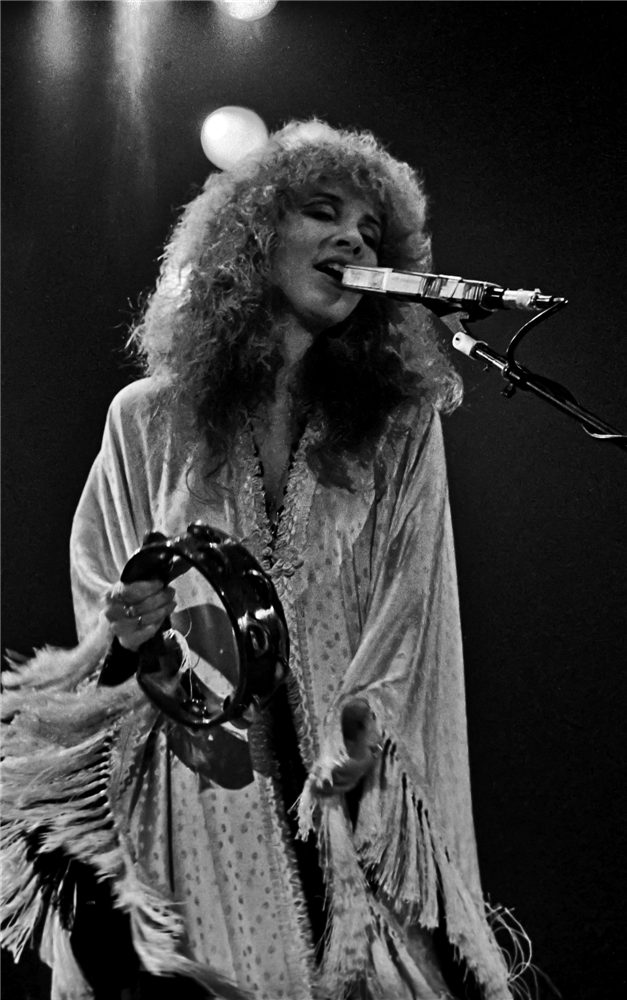
Stevie Nicks performing

In the Jazz Age and during the 1930s, all-female bands such as the Blue Belles, the Parisian Redheads (later the Bricktops), Lil-Hardin's All-Girl Band, the Ingenues, the Harlem Playgirls, Phil Spitalny's Musical Sweethearts, and Helen Lewis and Her All-Girl Jazz Syncopators were popular. Ina Ray Hutton led the Melodears from 1934 to 1939. Eunice Westmoreland, under the name Rita Rio, led a band that appeared on NBC Radio and for Vitaphone and RKO. The New Coon Creek Girls worked in the 1930s. A Polish group, Filipinki, was established in 1959.

All-female bands also played rock and roll, including Goldie & the Gingerbreads in 1964; the Pleasure Seekers with Suzi Quatro in 1964; the Feminine Complex in 1968; and Fanny in 1969. Others included the Liverbirds (1962–1967); the Ace of Cups (1967); the Heart Beats (1968); and Ariel (1968–1970).

===== 1970s–1980s =====
In 1971 Fanny became the first all-female band to reach the Hot 100's top 40, with "Charity Ball" peaking at No. 40. In 1975, the Canadian sister duo of Kate and Anna McGarrigle, recorded the first of a string of albums. The Runaways were an early commercially successful hard rock band, releasing their first album in 1976: band members Joan Jett, Cherie Currie, and Lita Ford all went on to successful solo careers.

The Happy Hollow Stringband (1974–1979) played bluegrass, with Sandy Crisco on banjo. She reported that it could be difficult to find the ladies' restroom during bookings, as many male instrumentalists did not know where it was. Another female band of the era was the WildWood Girls. Beginning in 1979 from the Chicago area, the band became a family affair. They performed for the USO and Department of Defense and also worked at Dollywood and at Bill Monroe's Bean Blossom Festival. They released six recordings.

The 1980s brought chart success to women instrumentalists for the first time. On the Billboard Hot 100-year-end chart for 1982, Joan Jett's "I Love Rock 'n' Roll" at No. 3 and the Go-Go's "We Got the Beat" at No. 25 showed that women who could play could bring in money.

In 1989, The Dixie Chicks (later just The Chicks) rose from street corners in Dallas, Texas, to great success. The band is a trio with Natalie Maines as lead singer, Natalie Maguire on the fiddle and mandolin, and Emily Robison on banjo, the dobro, guitar, and the accordion. They won five Grammys, the Country Music Association's Album of the Year, and the Vocal Group of the Year award in 2002.

===== Punk =====
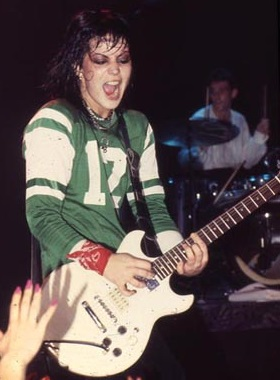
Joan Jett is often referred to as the "Godmother of Punk."

In the United Kingdom, the advent of punk in the late 1970s with its "anyone can do it" ethos encouraged women to make significant contributions. "That was the beauty of the punk thing," Chrissie Hynde later said. "[Sexual] discrimination didn't exist." Beyond participation, woman punk artists influenced the development of that genre of music.

Rock historian Helen Reddington claimed that many or most punk women musicians were more interested in the ideology and sociopolitical implications than on fashion, such as fishnet stockings and spiky blond hair Johnny Rotten wrote that "During the Pistols era, women were out there playing with the men, taking us on in equal terms... It wasn't combative, but compatible." Women instrumentalists were involved in bands such as the Slits; the Raincoats; the Mo-dettes; Dolly Mixture; and the Innocents. This egalitarian view was challenged, however, by guitarist Viv Albertine, who commented that "the A&R men, the bouncers, the sound mixers, no one took us seriously... So, no, we got no respect anywhere we went. People just didn't want us around." A similar view was voiced by Sonic Youth's Kim Gordon, who said she thought of women as natural anarchists because "you're always operating in a male framework."

===== Heavy metal =====
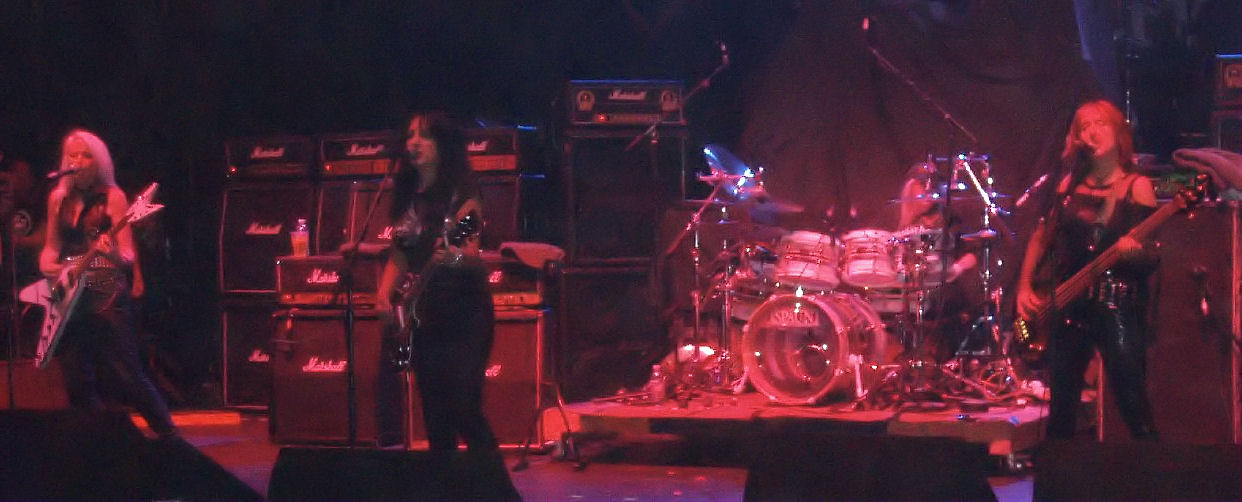
Girlschool is a British all-women heavy metal band formed in the new wave of British heavy metal scene in 1978 and frequently associated with contemporaries Motörhead. They are the longest running all-female rock band, still active after more than 35 years.

South London band Girlschool formed in 1978 and became known in the early 1980s. Band member Kathy Valentine left to join the Go-Go's, switching from guitar to bass. Among Girlschool's early recordings was an EP titled St. Valentine's Day Massacre, which the group recorded with Bronze label-mates Motörhead under the name Headgirl. In 1974, the Deadly Nightshade, a rock/country band, was signed by Phantom.

===== Grunge =====
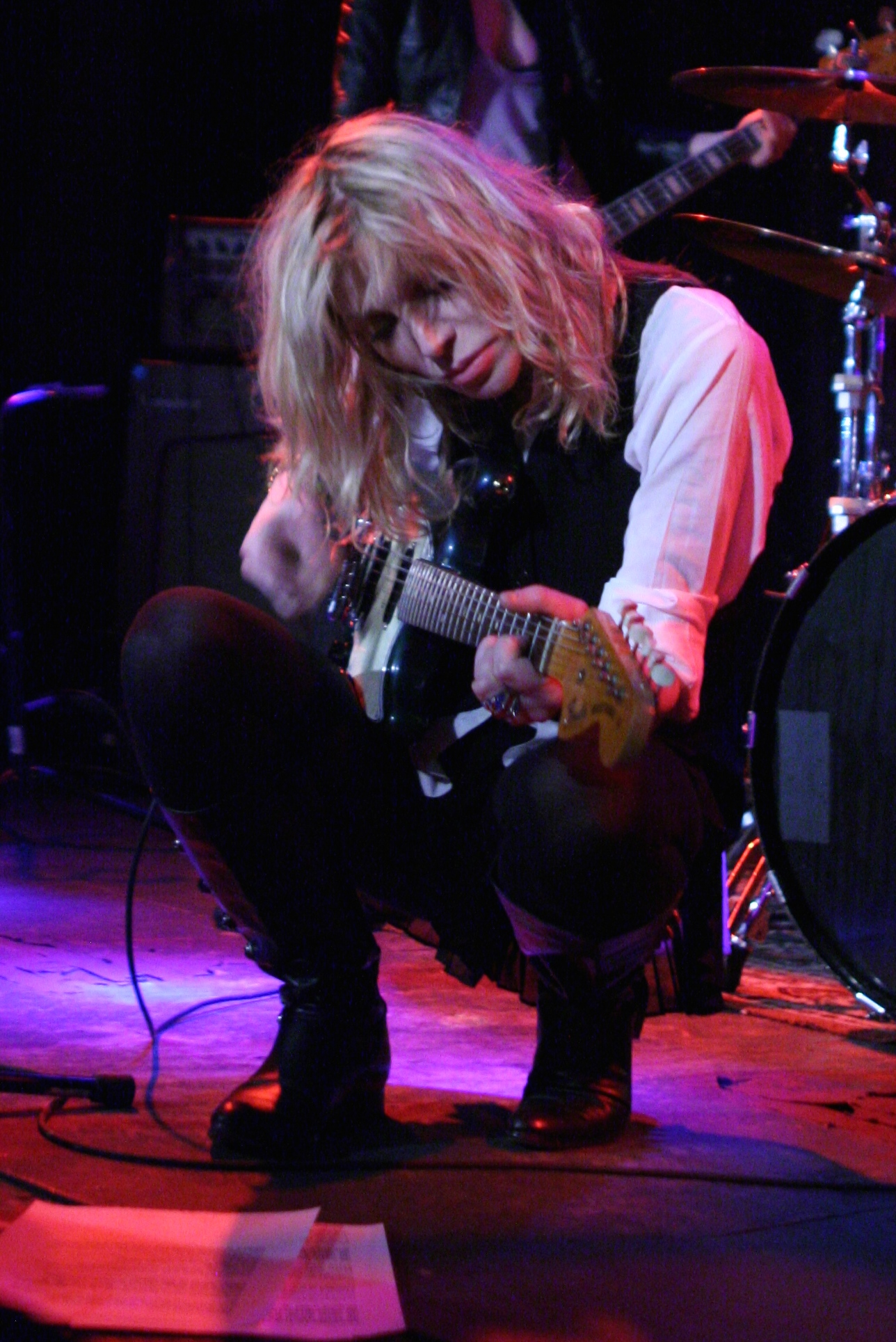
Courtney Love in 2012

Women were represented in grunge bands such as L7, Lunachicks, Dickless, STP, 7 Year Bitch, Courtney Love's group Hole, and Babes in Toyland. Riot Grrrl was part of an underground feminist punk movement. Women instrumentalists include bassists D'arcy Wretzky and Melissa Auf der Maur from The Smashing Pumpkins, and drummers Patty Schemel (Hole and Courtney Love projects), and Lori Barbero of Babes in Toyland.

==== 1990s–2000s ====
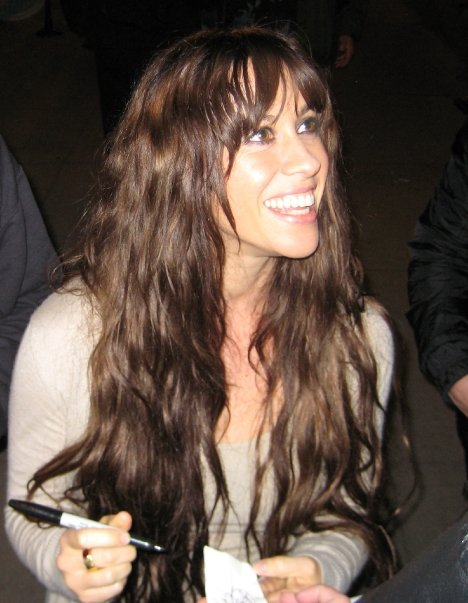
Alanis Morissette signing autographs for fans, 2011

In the 1990s, music magazines put Bonnie Raitt and Tina Weymouth on their covers. Club bands The Go-Go's and The Bangles were the first bands to find sustained success.

In rock, bands such as Hole, Super Heroines, The Lovedolls, and L7 became popular, offering self-confident and "bad" attitudes, challenging assumptions about how an all-female band should behave. Courtney Love described Hole's artistic ambitions as "[not] only repeating what men have done" while "coming at things from a more feminine, lunar, viewpoint."

In the 1990s, the punk female-led Riot Grrrl movement was associated with bands such as Bratmobile and Bikini Kill.

In pop music, two commercial groups briefly rose to fame. Destiny's Child was an American group composed of Beyoncé Knowles, Kelly Rowland, and Michelle Williams, beginning as Girl's Tyme in 1990 and becoming Destiny's Child in 1997. The Spice Girls was a British pop group composed of Mel B, Melanie C, Emma Bunton, Geri Halliwell, and Victoria Beckham. Their single "Wannabe" came out in 1996 and reached number one in 37 countries.

==== 2000s–2010s ====
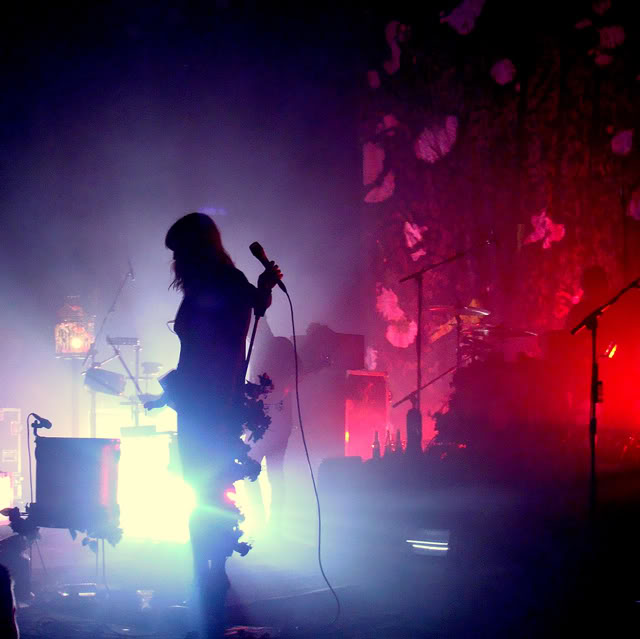
Florence and the Machine performing at the O_{2} ABC Glasgow during the band's Lungs Tour

In the 2000s, bands started using their influence to promote feminism and women in music. Bands like The Distillers, fronted by Brody Dalle, influenced the rise of street punk. St. Vincent gained traction and appeared on the cover of Guitar World magazine wearing a T-shirt with a bikini decal, a comment on how when women appear with guitars, they are usually minimally dressed, helping to sell the instruments. Haim, a band composed of three sisters, calls out music festivals for the lack of woman-fronted bands and the lower payment for women artists compared to male artists of the same level.

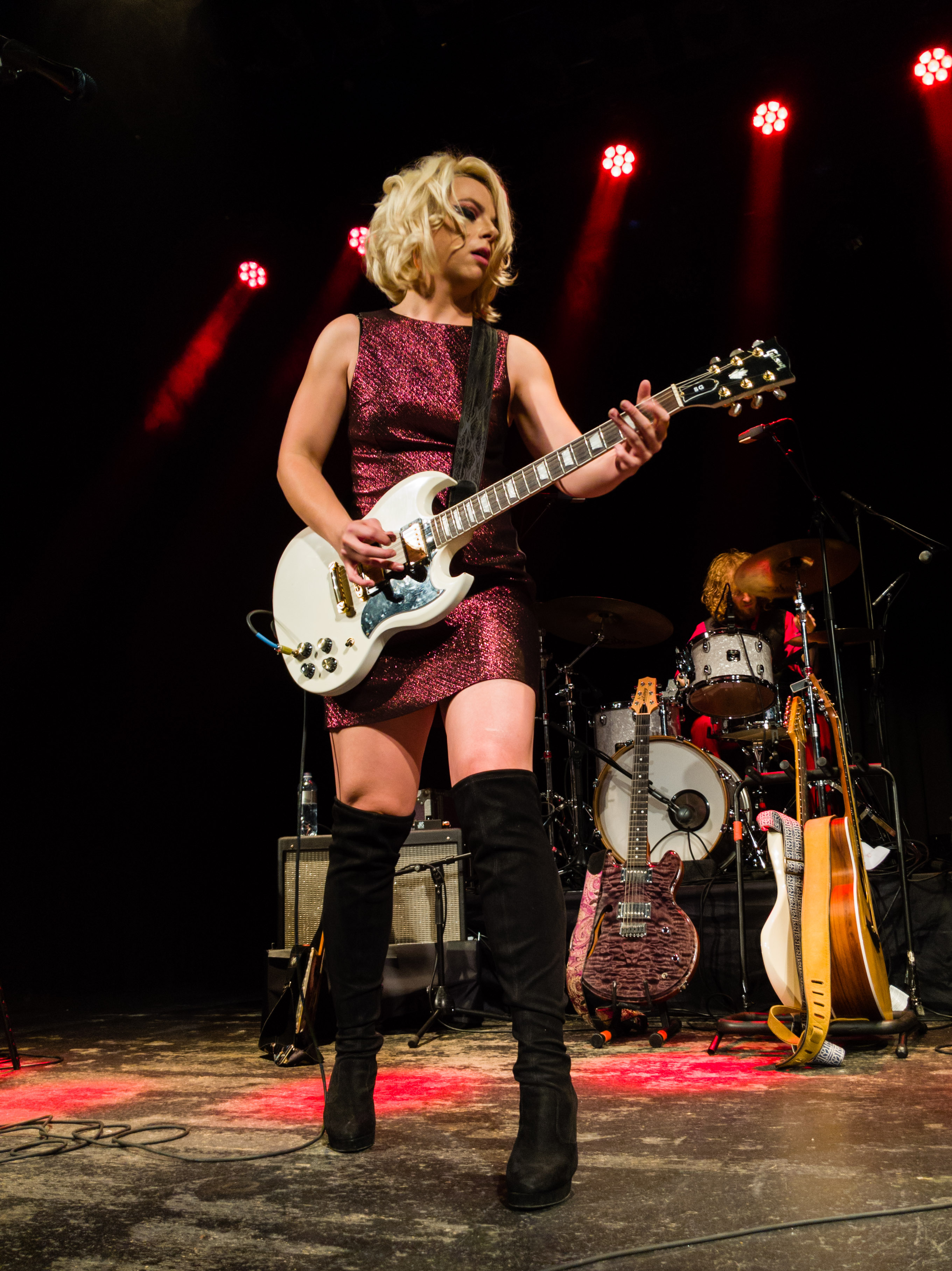
Samantha Fish is known for her blues-infused rock sound guitar playing skills

From 2010 to 2018, many girl bands gained attention, such as British band Little Mix, made up of Jesy Nelson; Leigh-Anne Pinnock; Jade Thirlwall; and Perrie Edwards. Little Mix was the first all-female group since the Pussycat Dolls to reach the US top five with DNA (2012). It also broke the Spice Girls' record for the highest debut US chart position for a British girl group's first release. Fifth Harmony, an American group composed of Ally Brooke; Normani Kordei; Dinah Jane; Lauren Jauregui; and Camila Cabello had three albums chart in the top 10 of the US Billboard 200.

=== Jazz ===
Women instrumentalists in jazz include:

- Toshiko Akiyoshi: bandleader, pianist, arranger, composer
- Regina Carter: jazz violin
- Melba Liston: trombonist and arranger
- Vi Redd: alto saxophonist
- Melissa Aldana: tenor saxophonist
- Emily Remler: guitar
- Mimi Fox: guitarist
- Sweet Emma Barrett: pianist
- Terri Lyne Carrington: drummer
- Carla Bley: pianist
- Mary Lou Williams: pianist
- Billie Pierce : pianist
- Jeanette Kimball : pianist
- Lovie Austin: pianist and bandleader
- Joelle Khoury: pianist and composer
- Shirley Horn: pianist
- Eva Cassidy: guitarist, pianist
- Ruth Brown: pianist
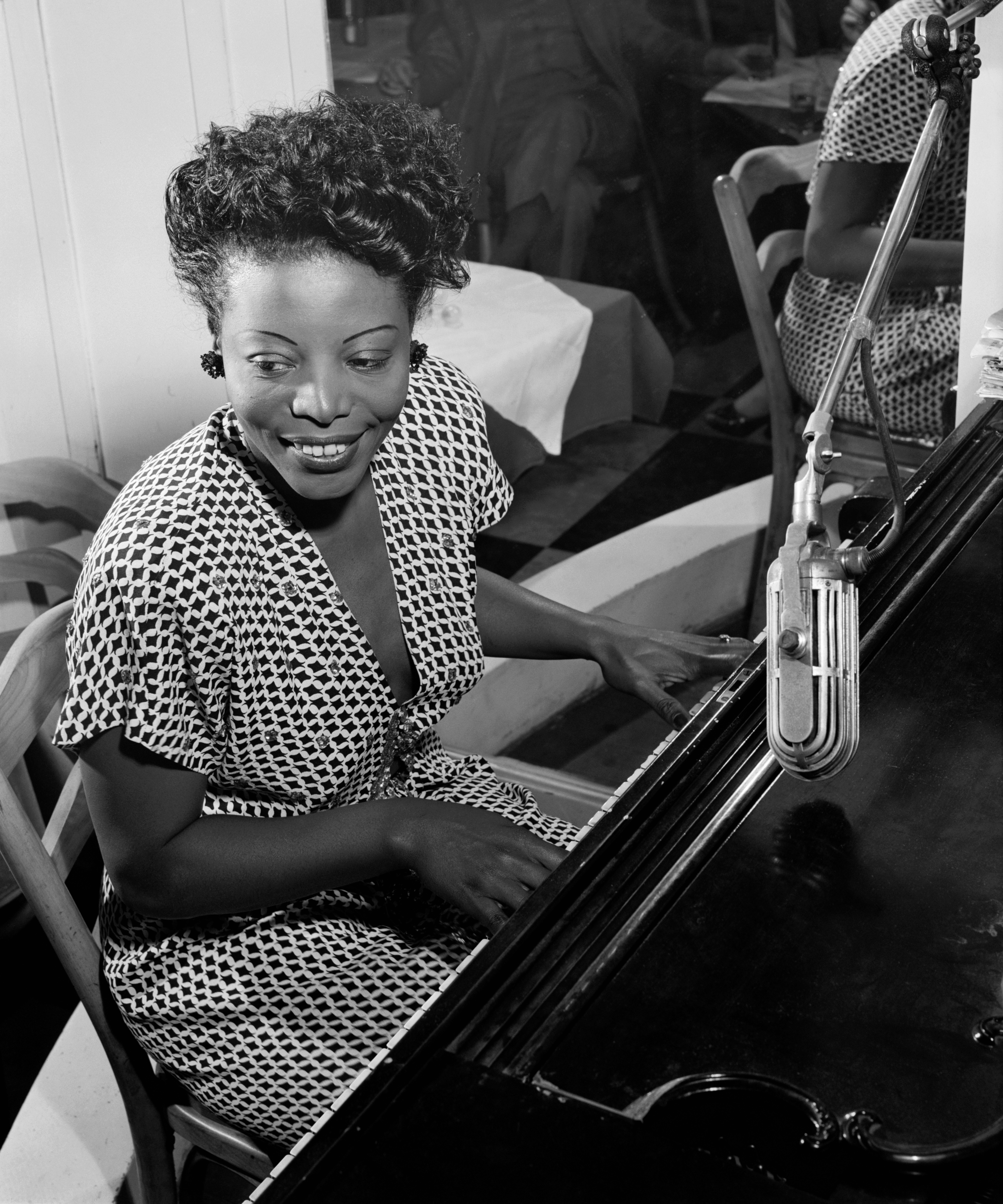
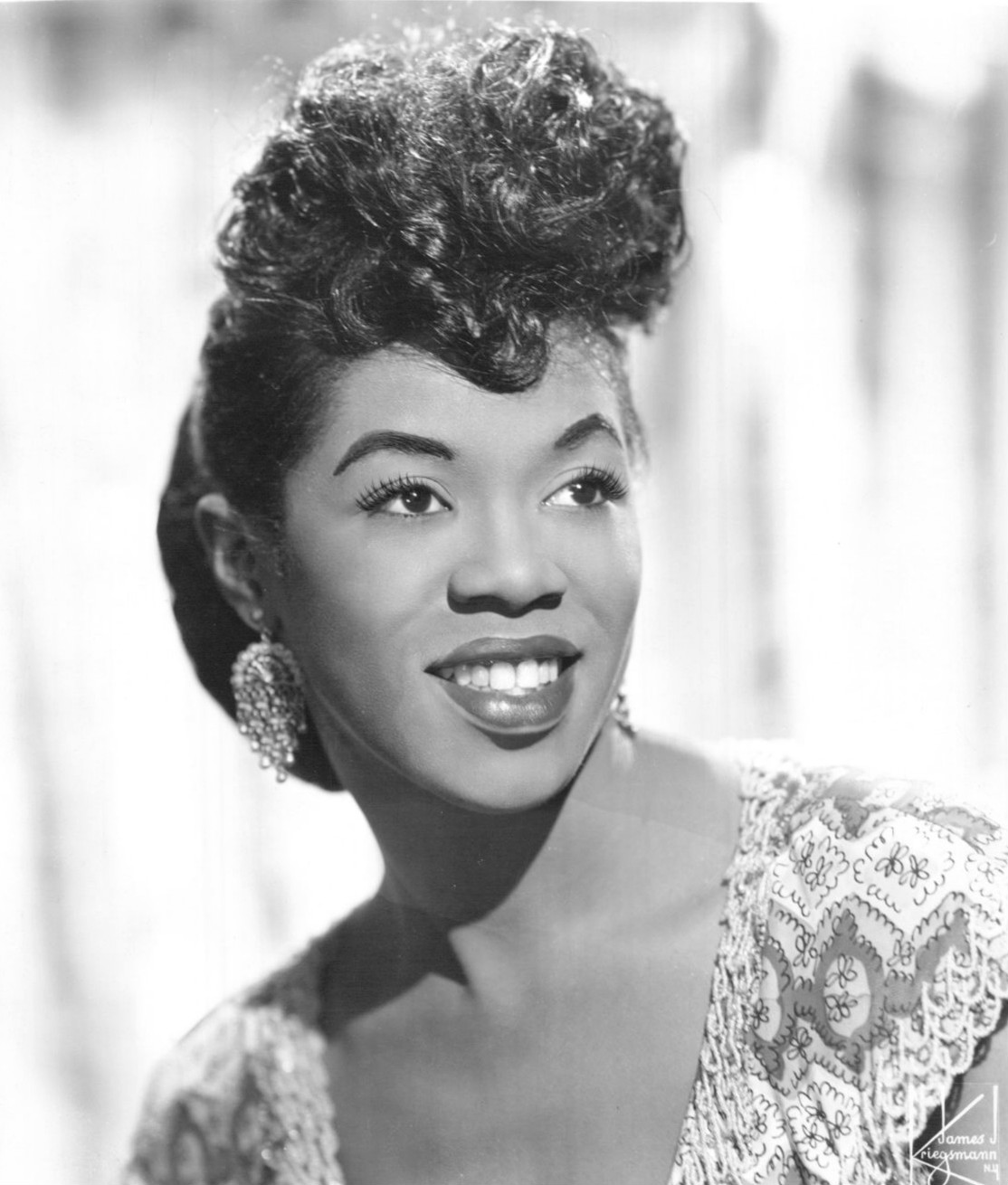
Mary Lou Williams (left) and Sarah Vaughan were two well-known jazz performers

Female jazz bands include The International Sweethearts of Rhythm and orchestras such as the Hour of Charm Orchestra. During World War II, these groups entertained the troops while the male musicians served. However, after the war, the public favored the "normalcy" signaled by male musicians.

Vocalist June Norton was the first black woman in the Washington, DC area to appear singing in TV commercials marketed towards Southern states, leading to her winning many awards including the 1962 Achievement Award from the National Association of Colored Women; the TV Personality of the Year award; the 1962 Emphasis Award from the National Association of Market Development; and the 1962 Singer of the Year Award from the YMCA.

Pianist, composer, and vocalist Shirley Horn recorded more than 25 albums and worked as a side musician for Stuff Smith, Toots Thielemans, Charlie Haden, and Oscar Peterson. Her debut recording, Embers and Ashes, attracted attention. A few months after, Miles Davis contacted Horn and told the Village Vanguard that he refused to play unless Horn opened for him. She received many awards including a Grammy in 1999 for Best Jazz Vocal Album for I Remember Miles; five Washington Area Music Awards; an honorary music degree from the Berklee College of Music; and a 2004 NEA Jazz Master Fellowship and Award from the National Endowment for the Arts.

=== Classical music ===
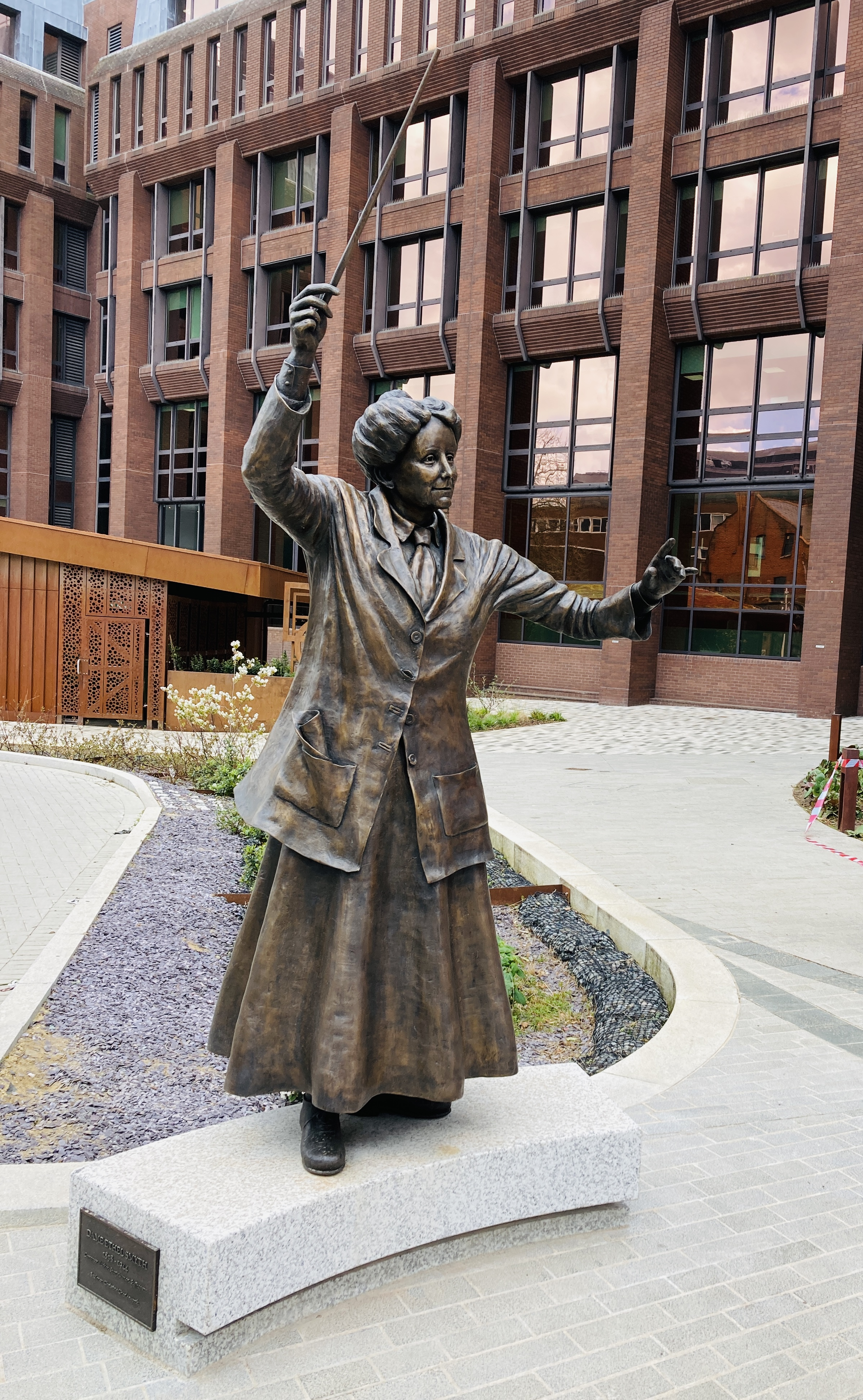
Statue of Ethel Smyth unveiled in Duke's Court Plaza, Woking, England, in 2022

Women instrumentalists have been performing classical music since the genre began, in all its forms (solos, small groups, and orchestras) and settings (religious, academic, royal, and commercial), despite reluctance to credit their abilities.

In the Album Era, promoters did not hesitate to use performers' physical attractiveness to gain exposure, increase sales, and even select performers to promote. Although some women artists rejected this approach, those who complied tended to achieve greater success.

==== Orchestra ====
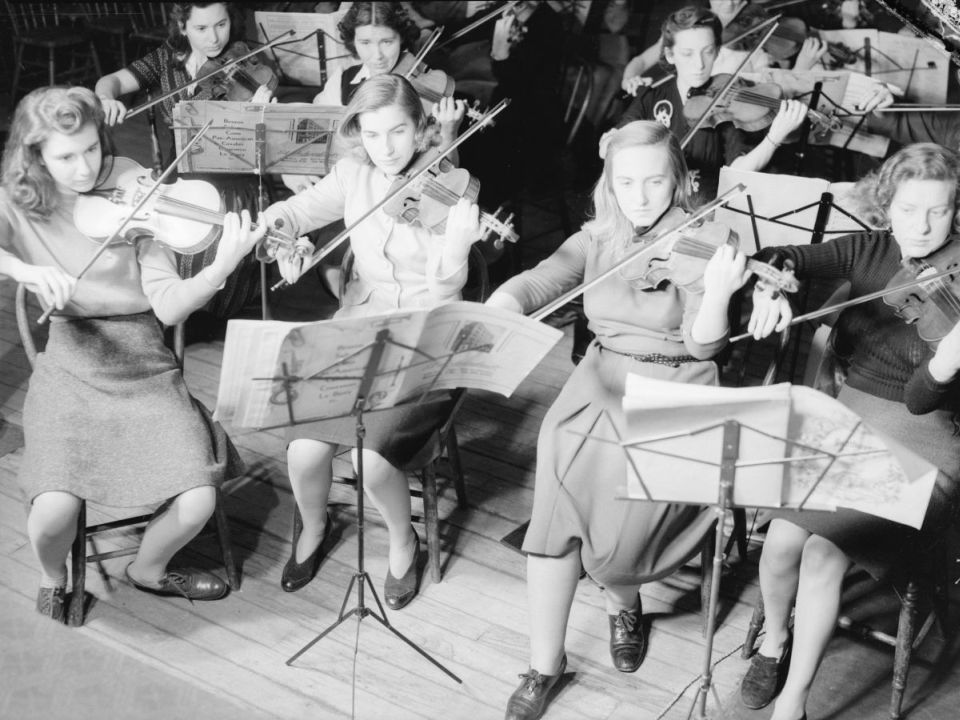
The Montreal Women's Symphony Orchestra in 1942

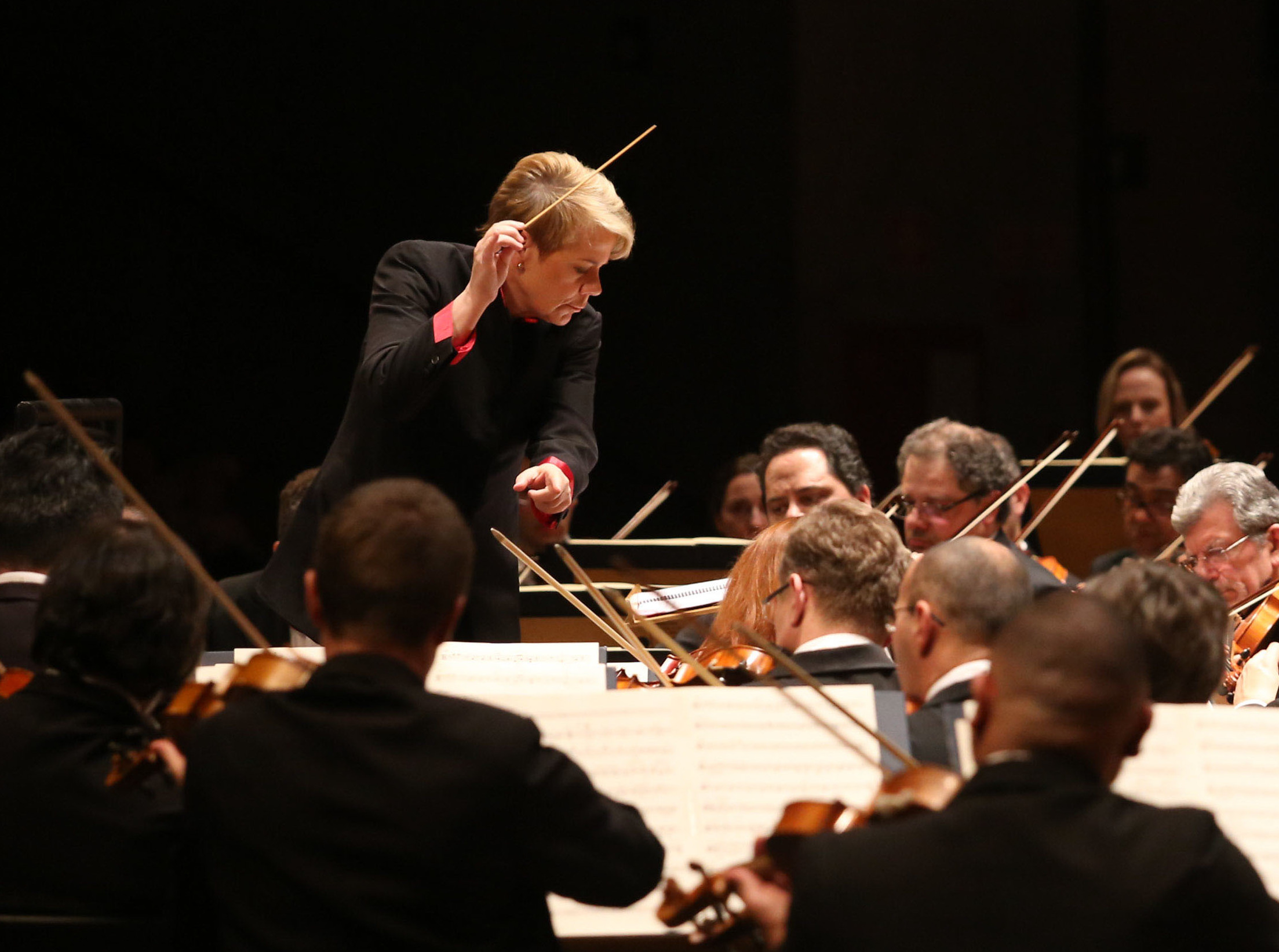
Marin Alsop with OSESP

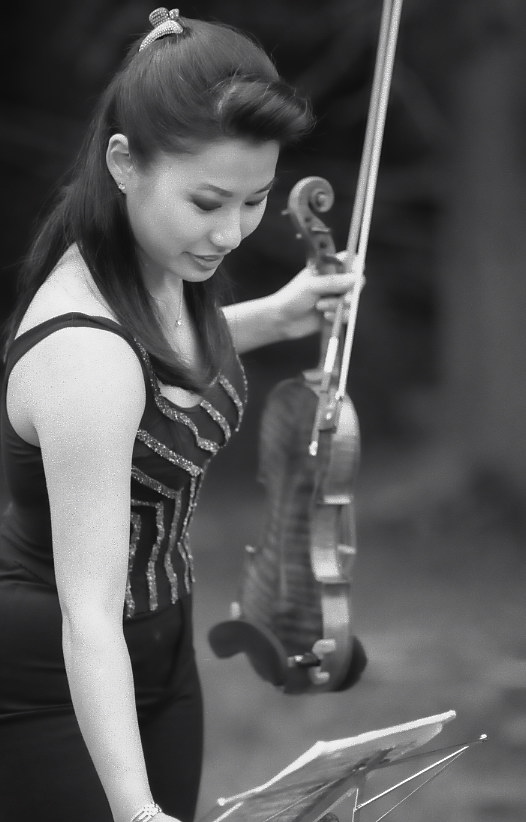
Classical violinist Sarah Chang before performing a 2005 solo concert

The Aeolian Ladies' Orchestra, founded in 1894 by Rosabel Watson, was one of the first professional orchestras exclusively staffed by women. A music newspaper editorial in 1917 in England encouraged orchestras to allow women to play the "lighter instruments," with the understanding that they would relinquish their positions to male artists after World War I ended.

Women were accepted in orchestras as harp players before being accepted on other instruments, as the harp was considered a "women's instrument." In 1922, harpist Stephanie Goldner became the first woman member of the New York Philharmonic. A hundred years later, women outnumbered men in the entire orchestra.

In the 1990s, to circumvent gender bias, some orchestras adopted blind auditions, requiring candidates to perform behind a screen. The practice continued into the 21st century, despite objections that equity could be advanced by modifying the practice.

A 1980s study reported that women made up 36% of US orchestras, 30% in the United Kingdom, and 16% in East and West Germany. Their chances of being hired in orchestras were greater in less prominent ones.

At one point, the Vienna Philharmonic Orchestra (VPO) argued that "ethnic and gender uniformity" gave their orchestra a better sound. Several male VPO musicians stated in a 1996 interview that classical music has "gender-defined qualities which can be most clearly expressed by male uniformity"; and first flautist Dieter Flury was of the opinion that accepting women would be "gambling with the emotional unity (emotionelle Geschlossenheit) that this organism currently has."

Only after protests by the National Organization for Women and the International Association of Women in Music while the orchestra was touring in 1997 did the VPO accept women to permanent membership, agreeing to admit Anna Lelkes as a harpist. As of 2013, the VPO had six woman members. Violinist Albena Danailova became one of the orchestra's concertmasters in 2008, the first woman to hold that position. VPO president Clemens Hellsberg said that VPO used blind auditions.

The Czech Philharmonic excludes women. The Berlin Philharmonic was reported to have a history of gender discrimination. Of the orchestras ranked among the world's top five by Gramophone in 2008, the last to appoint a woman to a permanent position was the Berlin Philharmonic. In 2013, an article in Mother Jones stated that "[m]any prestigious orchestras have significant female membership—women outnumber men in the New York Philharmonic's violin section—and several renowned ensembles, including the National Symphony Orchestra, the Detroit Symphony, and the Minnesota Symphony, are led by women violinists. Brass, percussion, and string-bass orchestra sections are still predominantly male."

==== Soloists ====
In classical music, soloists may perform unaccompanied solos on their instrument, as occurs with pianists who play works for solo piano or stringed instruments who play Baroque suites for one instrument (e.g., Bach suites for solo cello). In many cases, though, soloists are accompanied by a pianist; a small chamber music ensemble; or, in the case of a concerto, a full symphony orchestra.

In the 2014–2015 season, the majority of concerto soloists who performed with major Canadian orchestras were male. In the Vancouver Symphony Orchestra, 67% of the concerto soloists were male. In the Toronto Symphony Orchestra, 74% of the concerto soloists were male. In the National Arts Centre Orchestra, 79% of the concerto soloists were male. In the Montreal Symphony Orchestra, 84% of the concerto soloists were male. When the CBC news story on the gender balance of concerto soloists was released, the conductor of the Vancouver Symphony Orchestra, Bramwell Tovey, disputed the accuracy of the news story in regard to his orchestra, arguing that the article only took a single season into account.

An internationally famed soloist is Argentina's Martha Argerich, considered as one of the recorded era's greatest pianists.

== Singers ==
=== Popular music ===
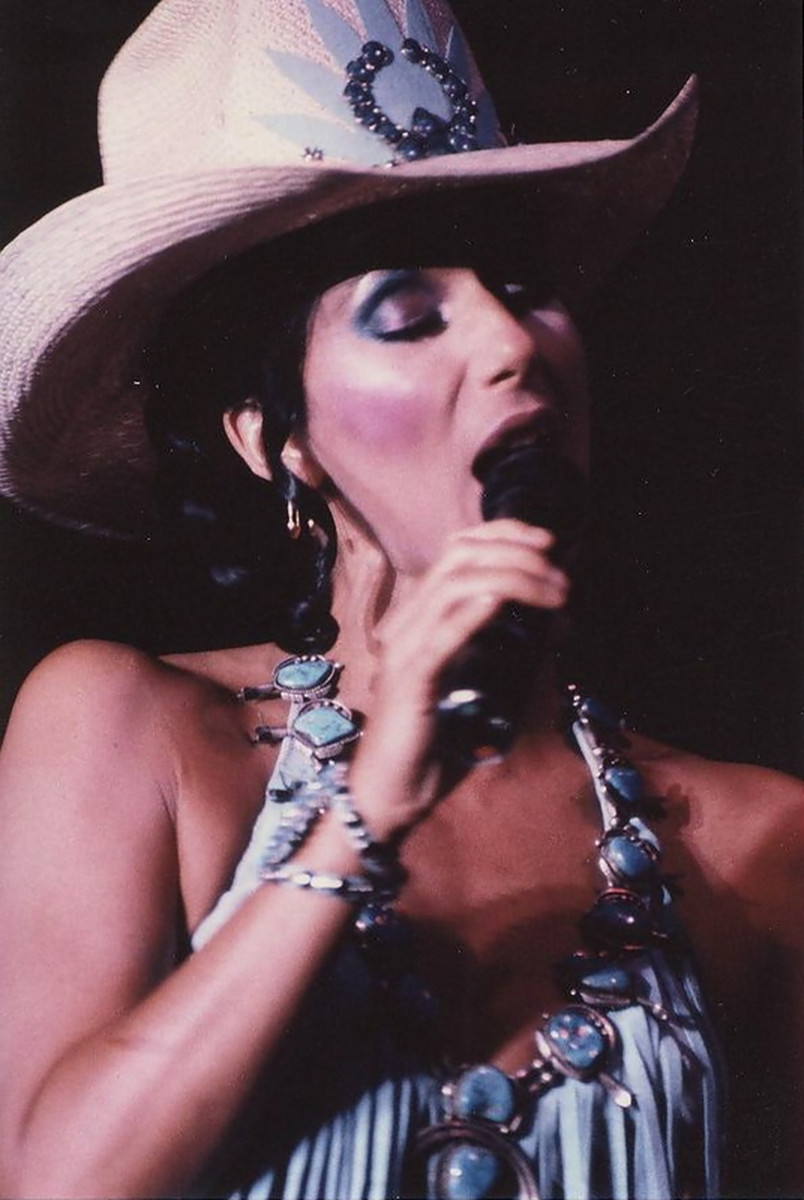
Cher

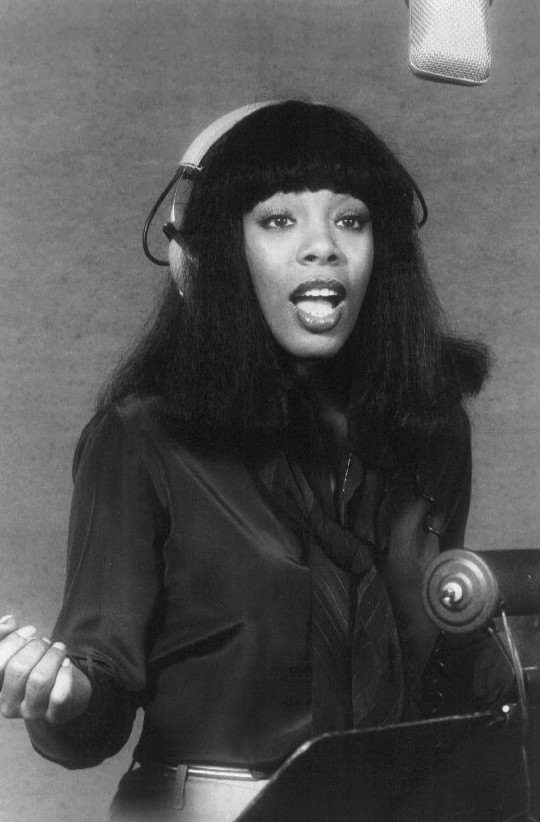
Donna Summer

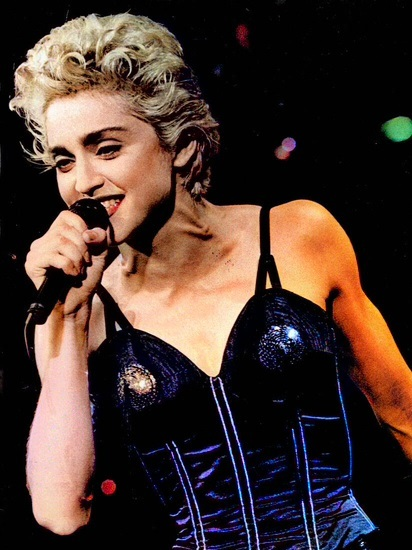
Madonna

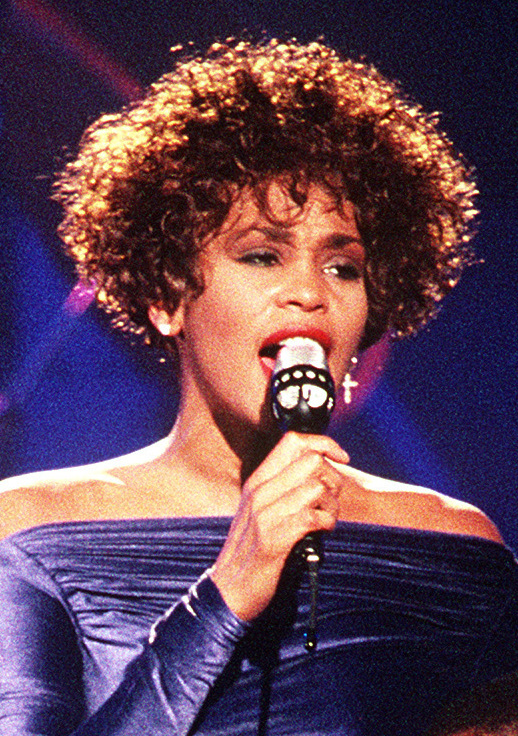
Whitney Houston

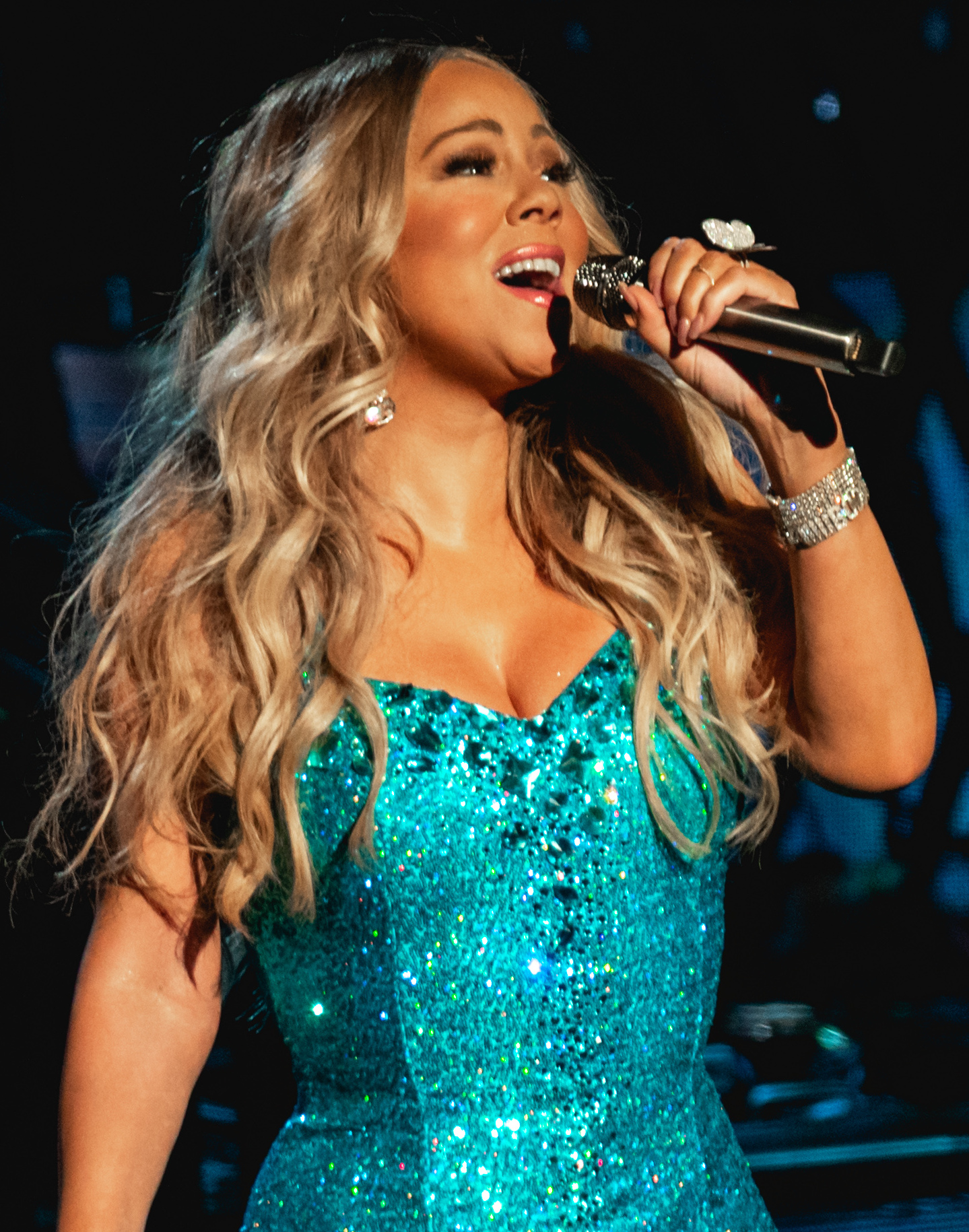
Mariah Carey

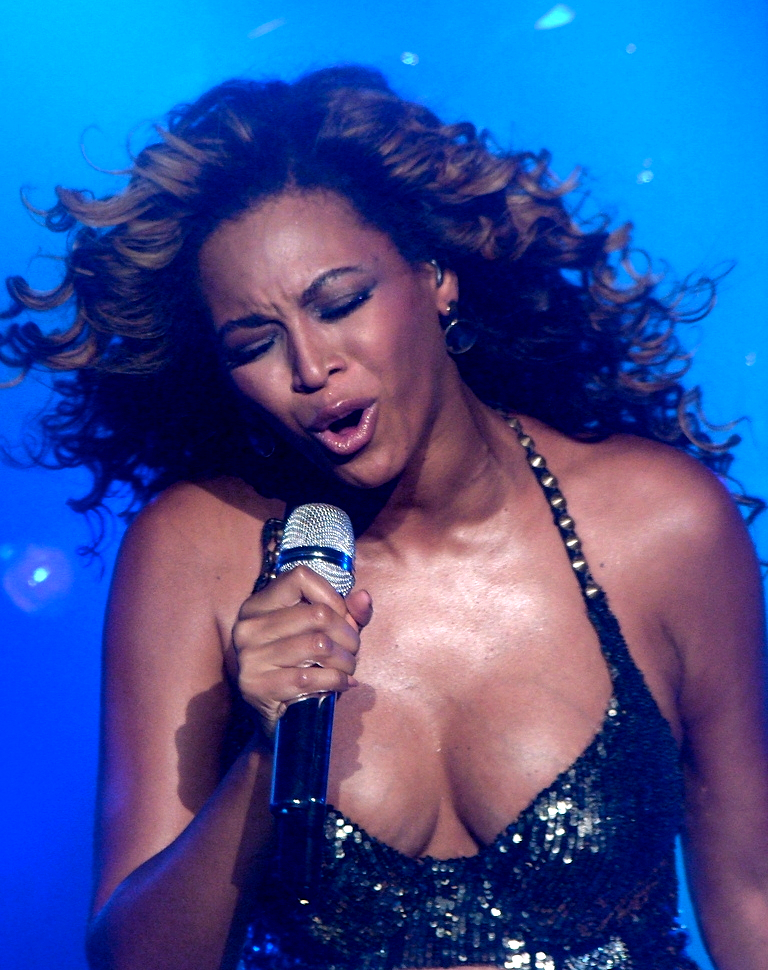
Beyoncé

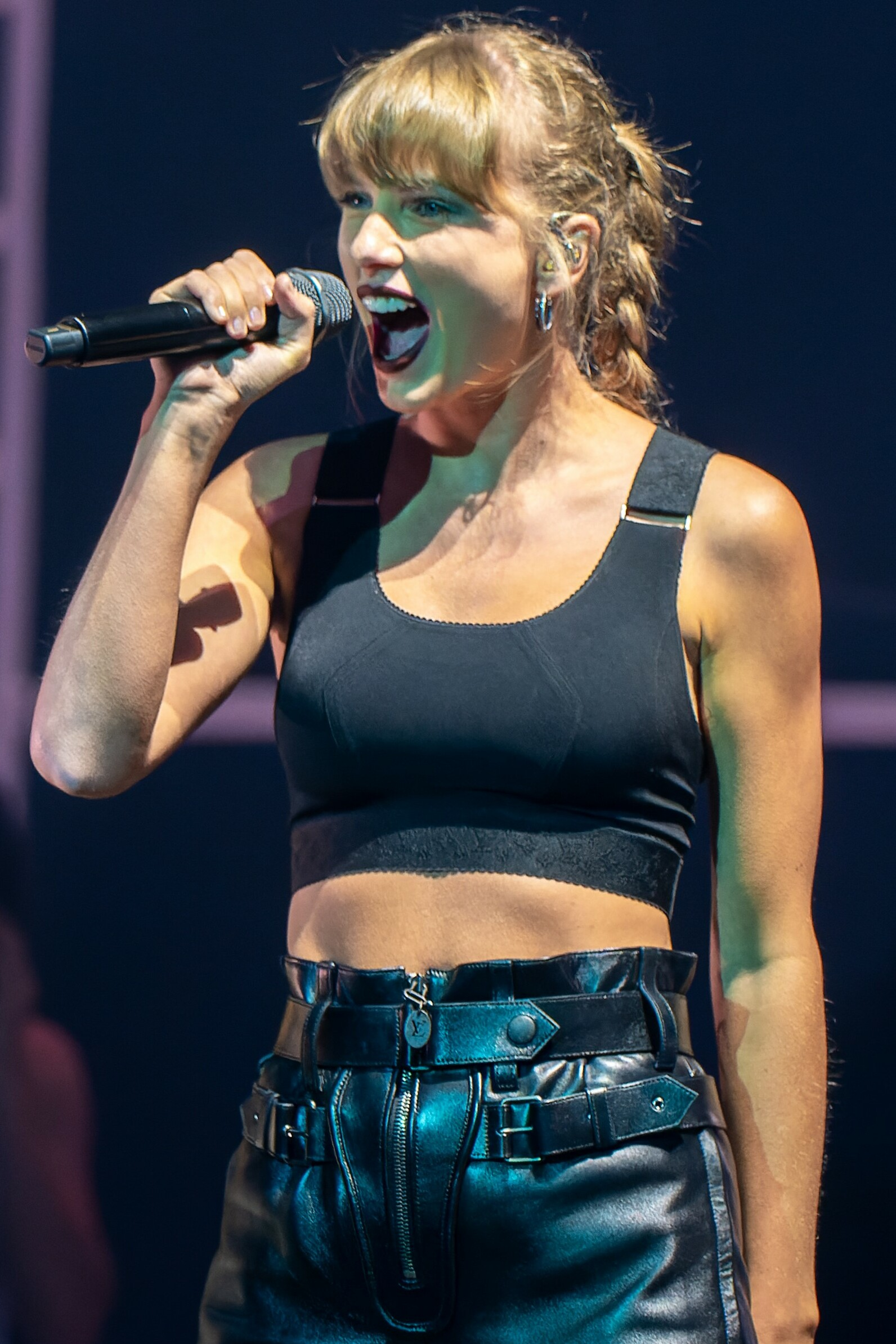
Taylor Swift

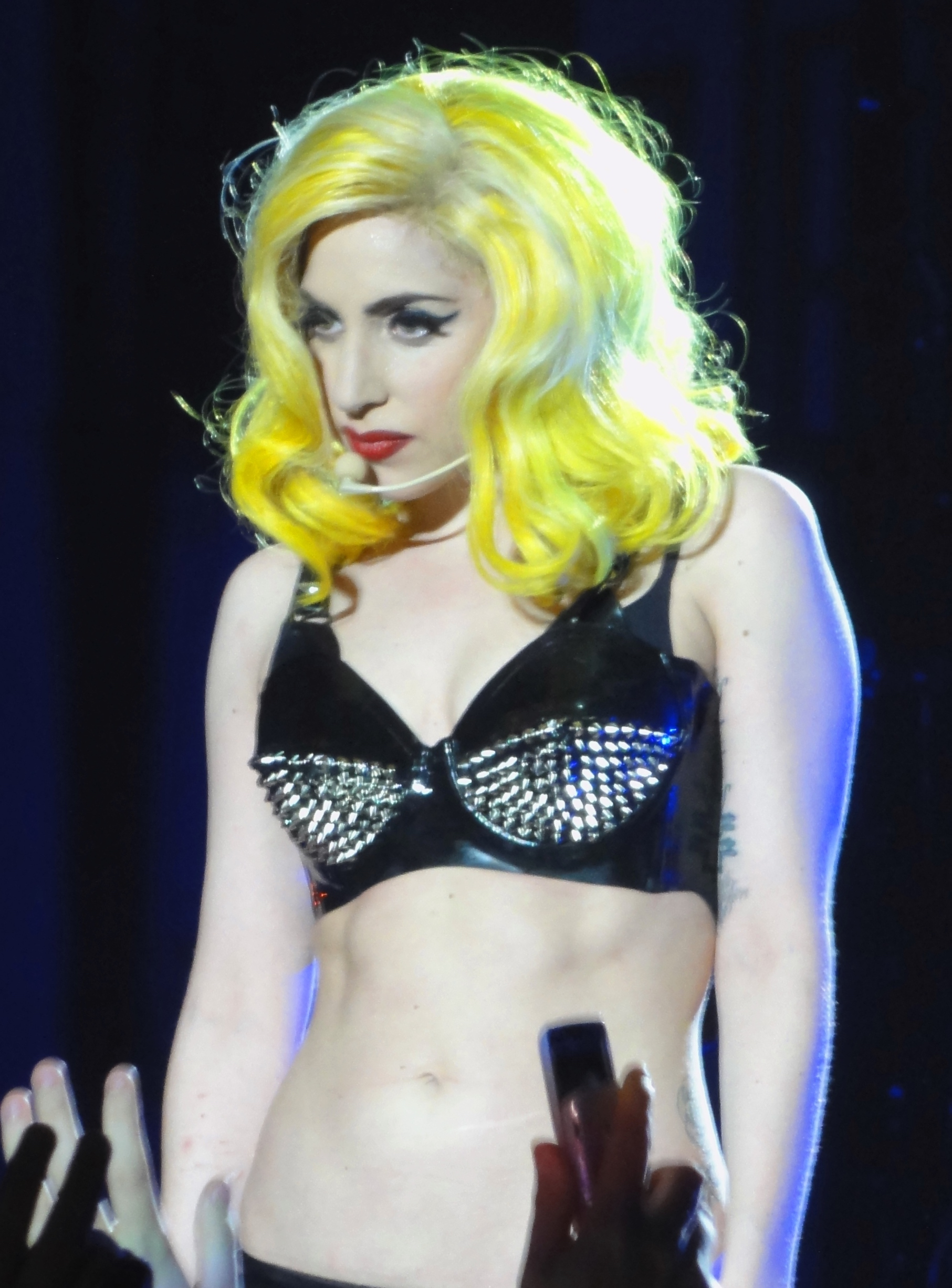
Lady Gaga

Examples of influential female pop artists, all of whom are among the best-selling music artists of all time

Singers in "pop music" perform the vocals for bands and other music groups, which may range in size from a duo or a power trio to a large jazz big band. Singers typically do both live performances and studio recordings. Those who do live performances may sing in small venues such as coffeehouses or nightclubs, or they may perform in larger venues ranging from arts centres to stadiums. Some singers also perform in music videos used to promote the songs.

In some styles of pop, singers may play a rhythm-section instrument, such as rhythm guitar, electric bass, or percussion instrument while they sing. In other styles of pop, singers perform choreographed dance moves during the show. Female pop singers known for elaborate dance routines in their live shows include Cher, Madonna, Beyoncé, Britney Spears, and Lady Gaga.

Cher has been described as "a pioneer of female autonomy during a male-driven era [who] paved a way in a sexist industry with her music." Although she recalls that era as "a time when girl singers were patted on the head for being good and told not to think," her own image eventually changed due to her "refusal of dependence on a man and the determination ... to refuse the conventional role assigned to women over forty years old in an industry that fetishises youth." Madonna, also a key figure in pop music, has also been credited with paving the way for women artists and permanently changing the music industry for women and today's pop stars. Other influential women contemporaries in pop music include Annie Lennox, Cyndi Lauper, Debbie Harry, Diana Ross, Donna Summer, Whitney Houston, Grace Jones, Rita Lee, Gloria Estefan, Selena Quintanilla, Janet Jackson, Kate Bush, Kylie Minogue, Nina Hagen, Olivia Newton-John, Pat Benatar, Stevie Nicks, and Tina Turner.

Singer-songwriter and music producer Björk has commented that the male collaborators of women singers are typically credited for the sound of their recordings because people see them performing on stage and assume they don't produce recordings or play an instrument. Lady Gaga has also weighed in on the difficulties faced by women recording artists because of the similarity of the music industry to a boys' club they can't get into. Along the same lines, Indie folk singer-songwriter/guitarist Ani di Franco states that for women, in the past, even entering a guitar store was an "act of courage" because it felt like a "boys' club." Indeed, one study found that customers did not treat a saleswoman at a guitar store as if she knew anything about guitars until she used special guitar terms.

Women in funk music include Chaka Khan, Labelle, Brides of Funkenstein, Klymaxx, Mother's Finest, and Betty Davis. Despite funk's popularity in modern music, few have examined the work of funk women. One who has, however, is cultural critic Cheryl Keyes, who focused on Betty Davis, calling her "an artist whose name has gone unheralded as a pioneer in the annals of funk and rock. Most writing on these musical genres has traditionally placed male artists like Jimi Hendrix, George Clinton (of Parliament-Funkadelic), and bassist Larry Graham as trendsetters in the shaping of a rock music sensibility."

Some of the most influential women singers since the 2000s include Adele, Alicia Keys, Ariana Grande, Avril Lavigne, Beyoncé, Billie Eilish, Britney Spears, Christina Aguilera, Demi Lovato, Dua Lipa, Florence Welch, Katy Perry, Kelly Clarkson, Kesha, Lady Gaga, Lana Del Rey, Miley Cyrus, Olivia Rodrigo, Pink, Rihanna, Sabrina Carpenter, Selena Gomez, Shakira, SZA, Tate McRae, and Taylor Swift. Most of them write their own songs, and some also produce music.

In East Asian pop music, during the 2010s, Japanese idol girl groups have been very successful in what is the largest physical music market in the world—and second largest overall—with 17 number-one singles just in 2017. The best-selling among all the J-pop idol girl groups, AKB48, is the best-selling act in Japan ever by number of singles sold—and third by total number of records sold—and has had as well the best-selling single in the country every year of the decade so far. Also, the best-selling album ever in the country, First Love, released in 1999, is by a woman, Japanese American singer and songwriter Hikaru Utada.

South Korean idol girl groups have also been very successful the 2010s, with Twice having the best-performing single of 2016 in the country, as well as having won a total of 43 awards since their debut in October 2015. Another highly successful Korean idol girl group this decade is Blackpink, reaching the highest place ever for a K-pop girl group on the Billboard Hot 100 as well as being the first K-pop girl group to be number-one on the Billboard Emerging Artists chart. It has also won a total of 16 awards since their debut in August 2016. Although K-pop has become increasingly popular in the US with many idol girl groups climbing their way up the leaderboards, most of its popularity is towards male groups, with woman groups being overshadowed by the concept of a boys-only club.

Chinese idol girl groups have also recently achieved significant success, with C-pop groups like SNH48 and Rocket Girls 101, with the latter selling over 1.6 million copies of their debut EP in 2018.

=== Blues ===
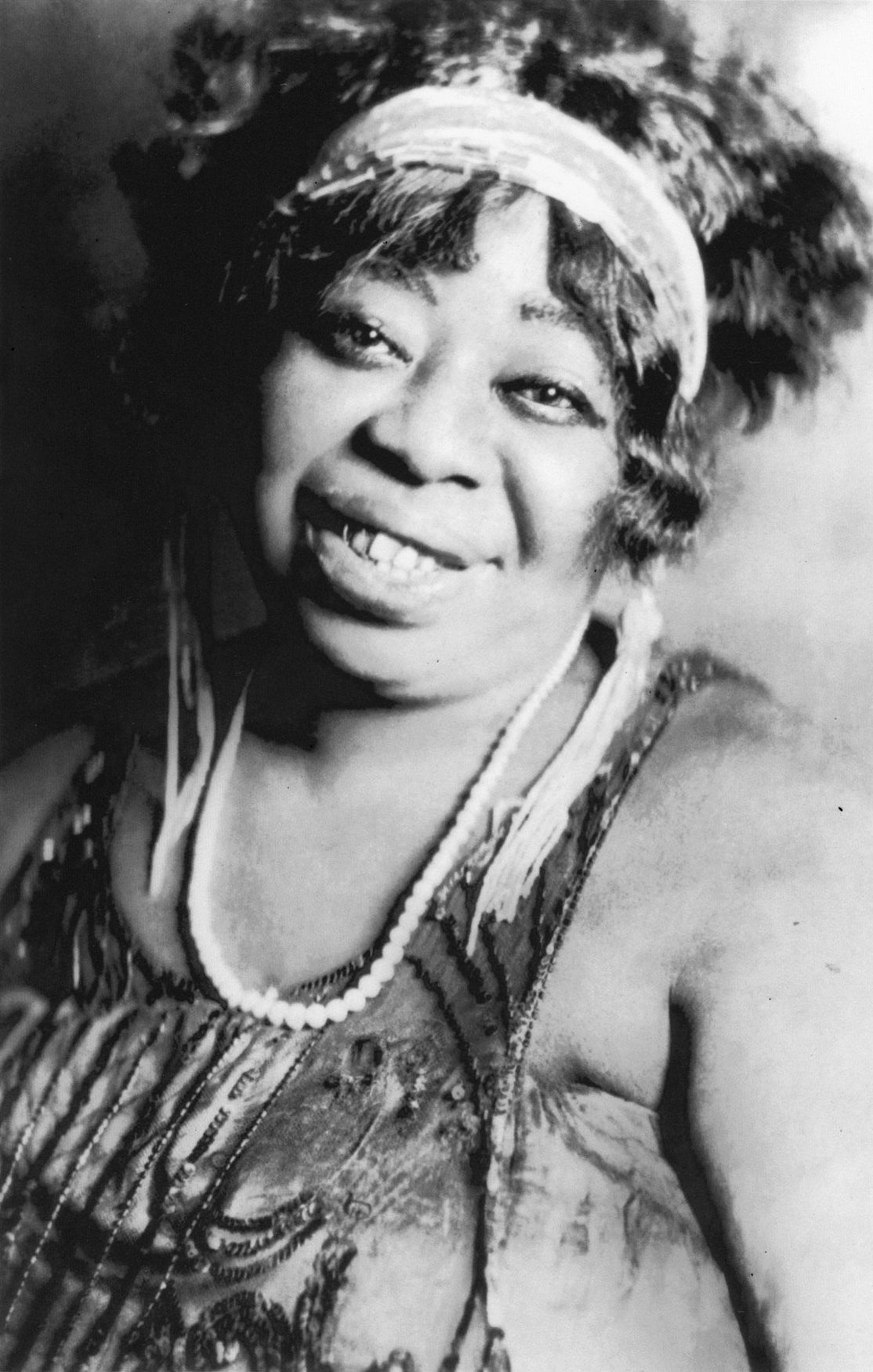
Ma Rainey (1886–1939) was one of the earliest known American professional blues singers and one of the first generation of such singers to record.

Classic female blues was an early form of blues music popular in the 1920s. An amalgam of traditional folk blues and urban theater music, the style is also known as vaudeville blues. Classic blues songs performed by woman vocalists were accompanied by pianists or small jazz ensembles, and were the first blues to be recorded. The classic female blues singers were pioneers in the record industry, as they were among the first black singers and blues artists who were recorded. They were also instrumental in popularizing the 12-bar blues throughout the US.

Gertrude "Ma" Rainey (1886–1939), known as the "Mother of the Blues," is credited as the first to perform the blues on stage as popular entertainment when she began incorporating blues into her act of show songs and comedy around 1902. New York-based cabaret singer Mamie Smith recorded "Crazy Blues" in 1920, which sold over 75,000 copies, and she became known as "America's First Lady of the Blues." In 1920, the vaudeville singer Lucille Hegamin became the second black woman to record blues when she recorded "The Jazz Me Blues." Ethel Waters, Alberta Hunter, Mary Stafford, Katie Crippen, Edith Wilson, and Esther Bigeou, among others, made their first recordings before the end of 1921. These blues recordings were typically labeled as "race records" to distinguish them from records sold to white audiences. Nonetheless, the recordings of some of the classic female blues singers were purchased by white buyers as well. Marion Harris became one of the first white female singers to record the blues.

The most popular of the classic blues singers was Tennessee-born Bessie Smith (no relation to Mamie Smith), who first recorded in 1923 and became known as the "Empress of the Blues." She became the highest-paid black artist of the 1920s, recording over 160 songs. Other classic blues singers who recorded extensively until the end of the 1920s were Ida Cox, Clara Smith, and Sara Martin. These early blues singers were an influence on later singers such as Mahalia Jackson and Janis Joplin. These blues women's contributions to the genre included "increased improvisation on melodic lines, unusual phrasing which altered the emphasis and impact of the lyrics, and vocal dramatics using shouts, groans, moans, and wails. The blues women thus effected changes in other types of popular singing that had spin-offs in jazz, Broadway musicals, torch songs of the 1930s and 1940s, gospel, rhythm and blues, and eventually rock and roll."

=== Country music ===
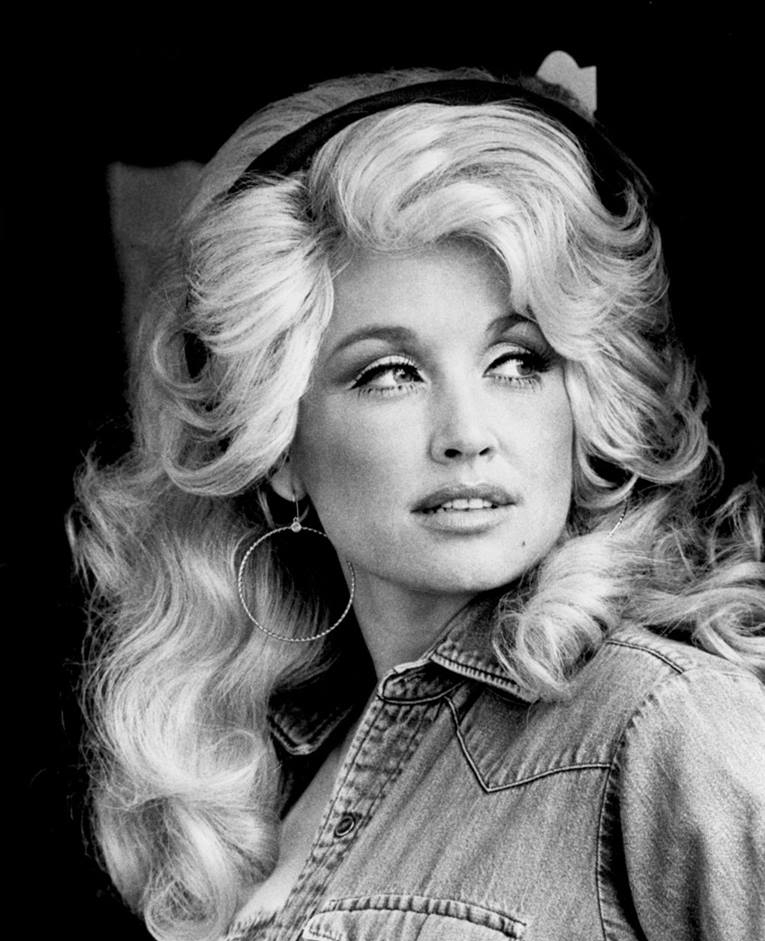
Dolly Parton

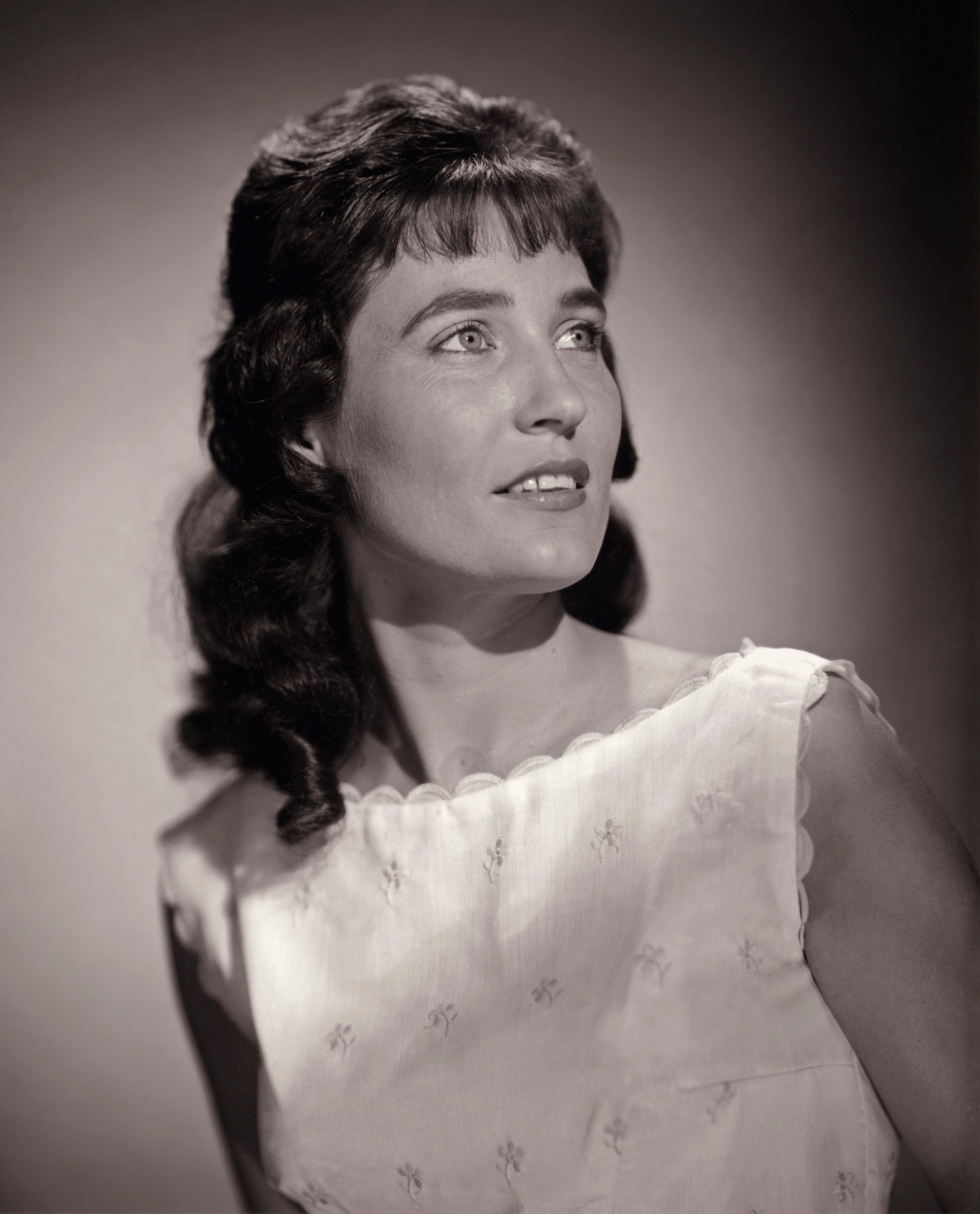
Loretta Lynn

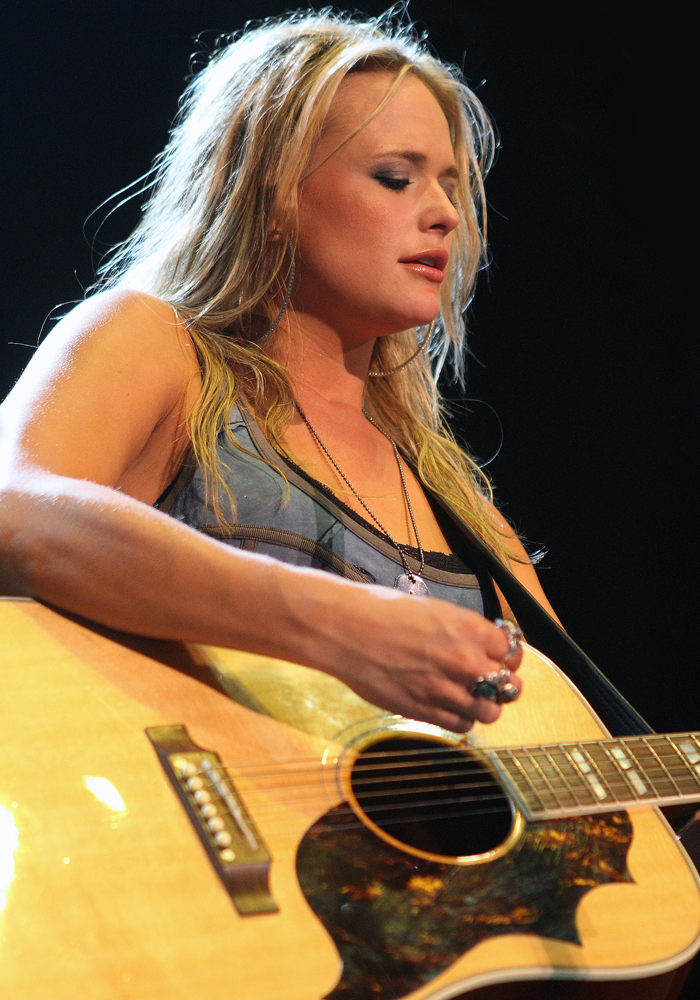
Miranda Lambert

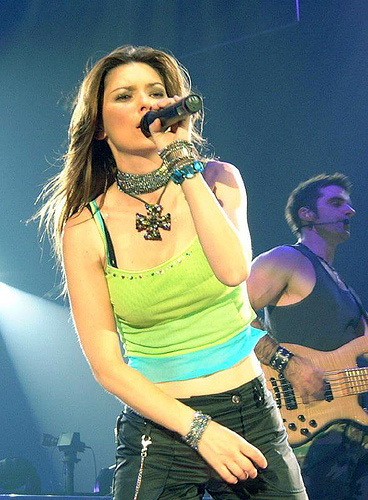
Shania Twain

Examples of leading and pioneer country musical female figures

A large number of women singers in the country music genre have been influential to the industry through their success. Despite the popularity of male country artists and the discrimination displayed throughout their music, many women artists have worked their way past, leading them to achieve multiple accomplishments.

Dolly Parton, a country singer in the industry for over 55 years, developed a successful career. She consistently created new projects to release to her fans and was described as "unstoppable" by Rolling Stone magazine. Included in these projects are over 45 musical albums; multiple film features; a theme park, Dollywood; and the creation of a production company.

Carrie Underwood, an iconic American Idol winner, also created a lasting impact in the country music genre. With over 251,000 units sold, Underwood's album Cry Pretty was her fourth album to reach number one on the Billboard 200 list, after Blown Away, Play On, and Carnival Ride. These achievements led her to become the first woman singer to have four country albums as number one in the all-genre Billboard 200. Underwood has had multiple other number ones throughout her career, surpassing many other popular artists while leaving a strong impact on the female country music industry.

A women's rights activist and animal lover, Miranda Lambert, has also had a dominating career within country music. Her songs titled "Over You" and "Heart Like Mine" took over the Billboard charts and country music radio stations in 2010 and 2011. As a solo woman artist, she writes her music through honesty and reality. The messages sent through her music are intended to help other women not feel alone as they go through difficult life situations. Using the fame she has earned from the music industry, Lambert works with charities like the Humane Society as a way to give back.

However, gender discrimination and sexism occurs frequently in country music and has become more prominent in this genre over time, going backwards compared to some categories like rap and pop. Dr. Eric Rasmussen, a professor in the College of Media and Communication and Texas Tech University, argues that compared to the 1990s, the country music of the 2010s discriminates more against women; for instance, in "talking more about women's appearance, [showing] women in tight or revealing clothing, comparing women to objects, referring to women in slang [terms] versus their real names, and portraying women as distrustful and cheaters."

Starting in the 2010s, a popular subgenre has developed: bro-country, with lyrics that have been criticized for sexually objectifying women and framing them as assets for men's use. Some popular bro-country artists include Luke Bryan, Florida Georgia Line, and Blake Shelton. Bro-country may be influenced by historical aspects of Southern culture that have been associated with racism and sexism. Women in country music continue to face these issues and often find no way to directly deal with them; for instance, as recording artist Kacey Musgraves describes her experience in country music, if a label fails to get a woman's song off the ground, it is immediately blamed on her personality or the fact that she is a woman, or on her not making a radio station program director feel important.

=== Jazz ===
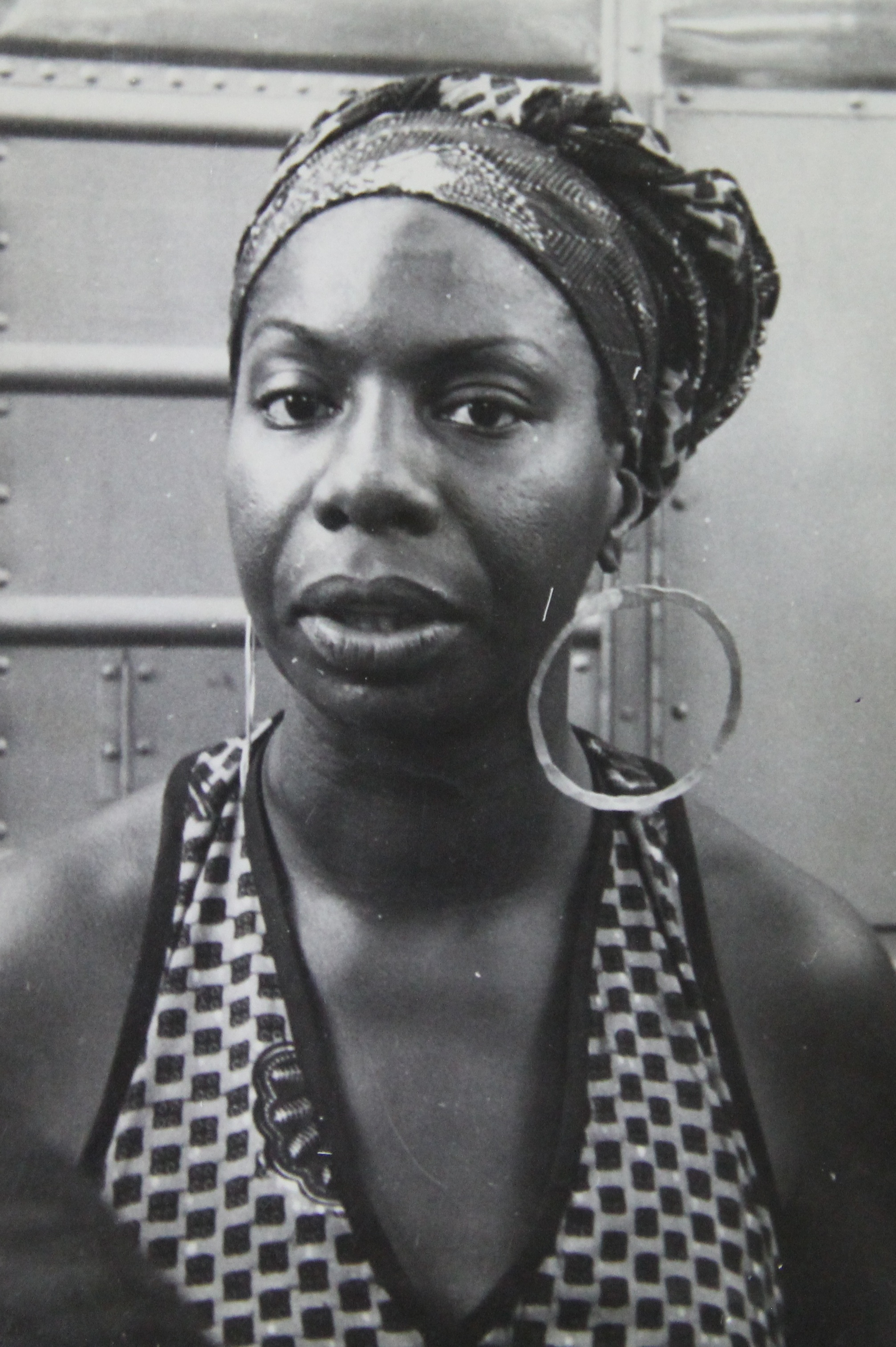
Nina Simone, an influential jazz musical figure

Although women have been underrepresented in jazz as instrumentalists, composers, songwriters and bandleaders, there have been many female jazz singers. Bessie Smith sang both the blues and jazz. Lena Horne first appeared in the Cotton Club as a teenager. Ella Fitzgerald and Billie Holiday were known for their ballads during the Swing Era. Shirley Horn sang both jazz and blues. Nina Simone sang jazz, folk, and rhythm and blues. Etta Jones sang rhythm and blues and jazz. Anita O'Day is known for her contributions to bebop. Betty Carter sang during the Post-Bop Era. Mary Lou Williams was a singer and pianist during the Swing and Hard Bop Eras. Sarah Vaughan is known for her singing in the Cool Jazz Era.

Other jazz singers include Rosemary Clooney, Diane Schuur, and Flora Purim. Contemporary jazz singers include Norah Jones, Diana Krall, Melody Gardot, Dianne Reeves and singer-bassist Esperanza Spalding. whose advocacy for discussion of the current discrimination in jazz was highlighted in 2017 when she spent 77 hours straight livestreaming the creation of an album, Exposure, through the entire process of writing, arranging, and recording that showed to thousands a woman working confidently within the male-dominated space of a recording studio.

=== Classical music ===
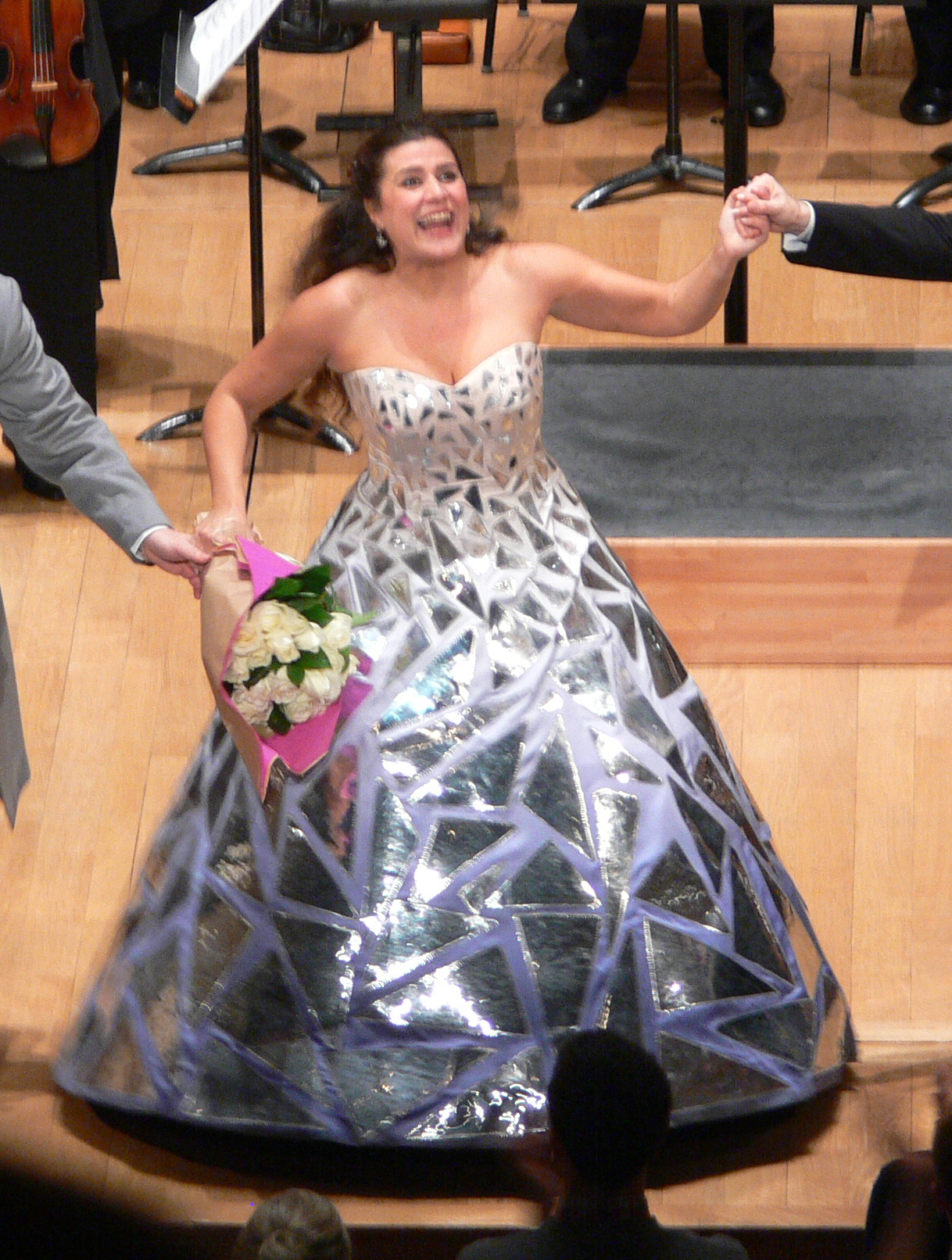
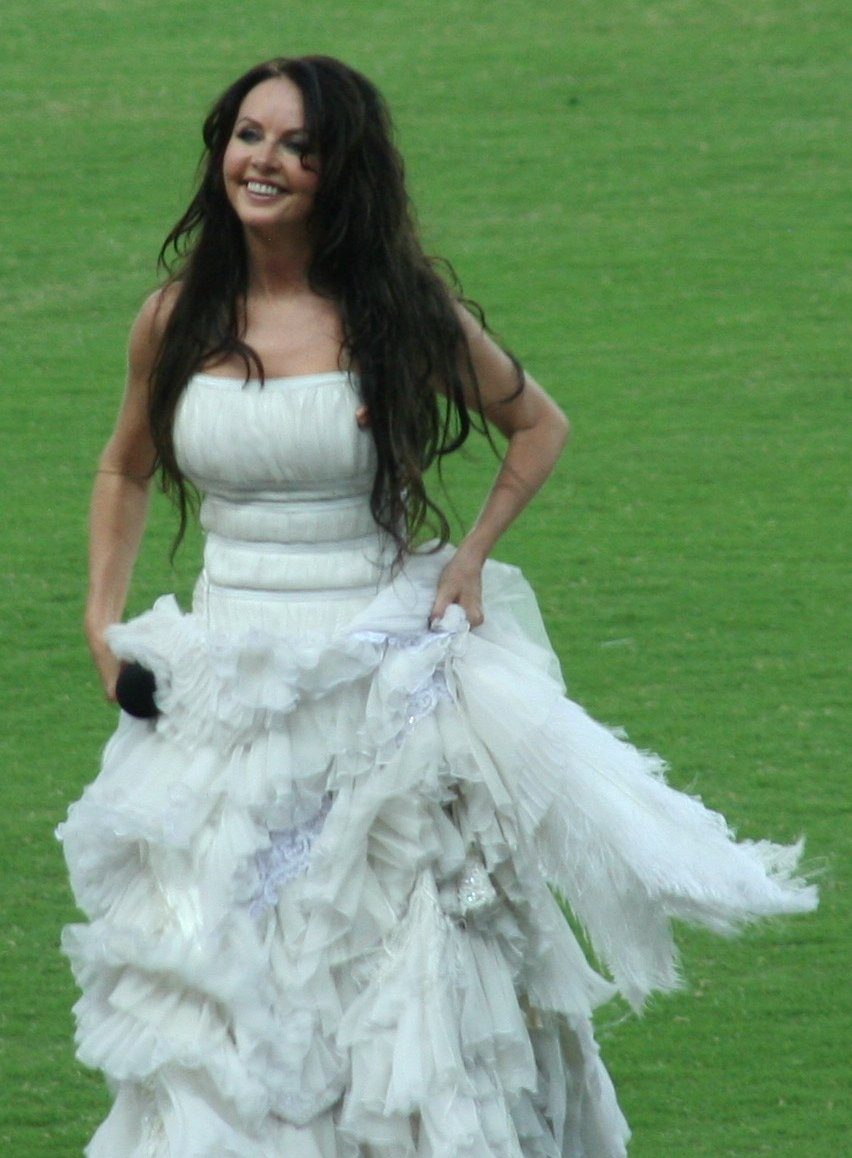
From left to right: Cecilia Bartoli and classical crossover pop singer, Sarah Brightman

Classical singers typically do both live performances and recordings. Live performances may be in small venues, such as churches, or large venues, such as opera halls or arts centers. Classical singers may specialize in specific types of singing, such as art songs—songs performed with piano accompaniment—or opera, which is singing accompanied by a symphony orchestra in a staged, costumed theatrical production.

Classical singers are typically categorized by their voice type, which indicates both their vocal range and in some cases also the "color" of their voice. Among voice types that indicate the range of a woman singer's voice are (from lowest to highest range) contralto, mezzo-soprano and soprano. Among voice types that indicate both the woman singer's range and the "color" of her voice type are coloratura soprano and lyric soprano.

Whereas popular music singers typically use a microphone and a sound reinforcement system for their vocals, in classical music the voice must be projected into the hall naturally, a skill that requires specialized vocal training.

==== Black women ====
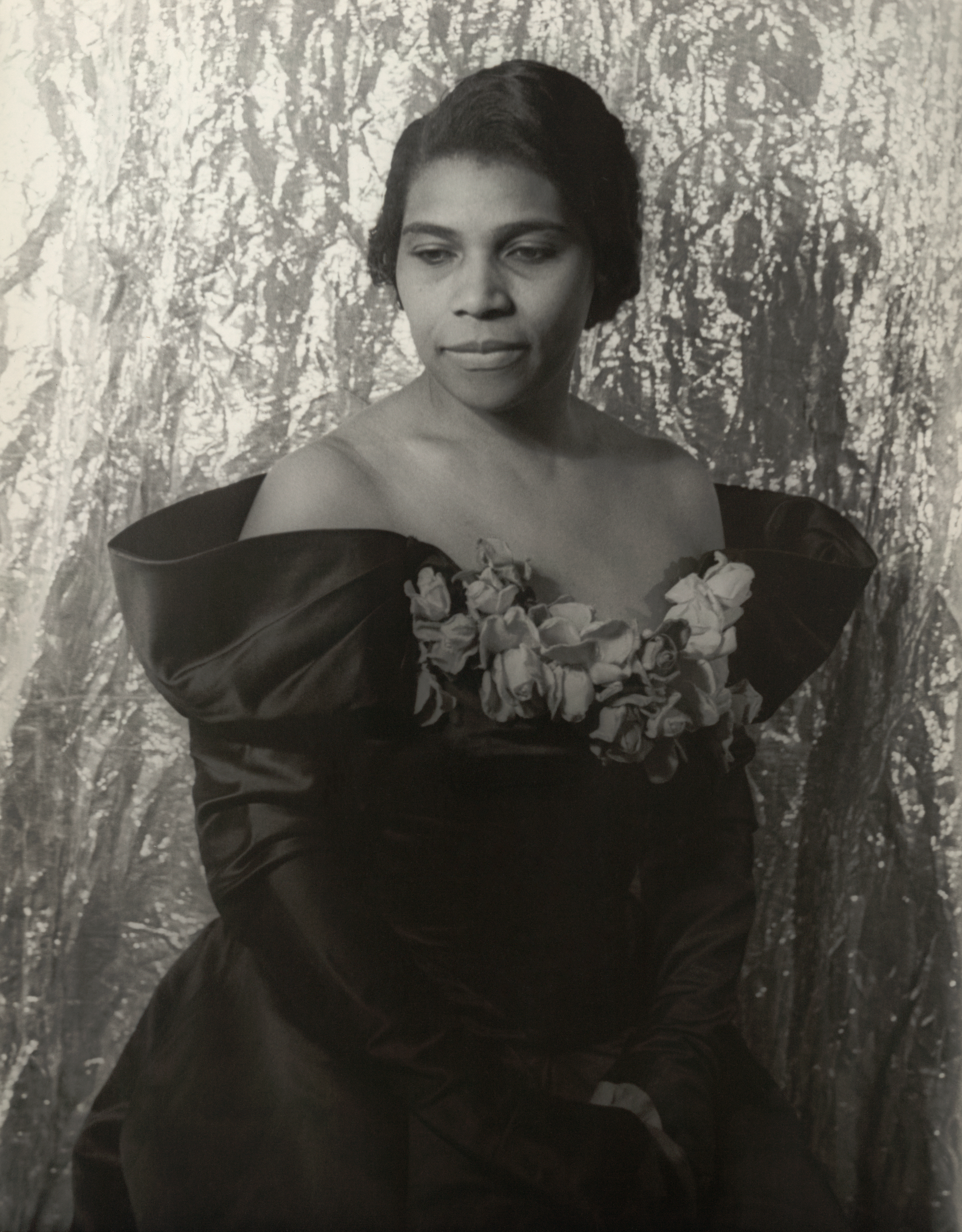
Marian Anderson in 1940

Marian Anderson (1897–1993) was a black contralto of whom music critic Alan Blyth said: "Her voice was a rich, vibrant contralto of intrinsic beauty." Most of her singing career was spent performing in concert and recital in major music venues and with famous orchestras throughout the United States and Europe between 1925 and 1965.

Anderson became an important figure in the struggle for black artists to overcome racial prejudice in the United States during the mid-20th century when the Daughters of the American Revolution (DAR) refused permission for her to sing to an integrated audience in Constitution Hall, Washington, DC. With the aid of First Lady Eleanor Roosevelt and her husband President Franklin D. Roosevelt, she performed a critically acclaimed open-air concert on the steps of the Lincoln Memorial in Washington before a crowd of more than 75,000 and a radio audience in the millions on Easter Sunday, 9 April 1939. She continued to break barriers for black artists in the United States, becoming the first black person, American or otherwise, to perform a leading role at the Metropolitan Opera, 7 January 1955 in New York City.

==== Classical singers ====
A short list of noted women classical singers includes:

- Elly Ameling
- Cecilia Bartoli
- Kathleen Battle
- Maria Callas
- Natalie Dessay
- Joyce DiDonato
- Renée Fleming
- Elina Garanca
- Susan Graham
- Anna Netrebko
- Jessye Norman
- Frederica von Stade

=== World music ===
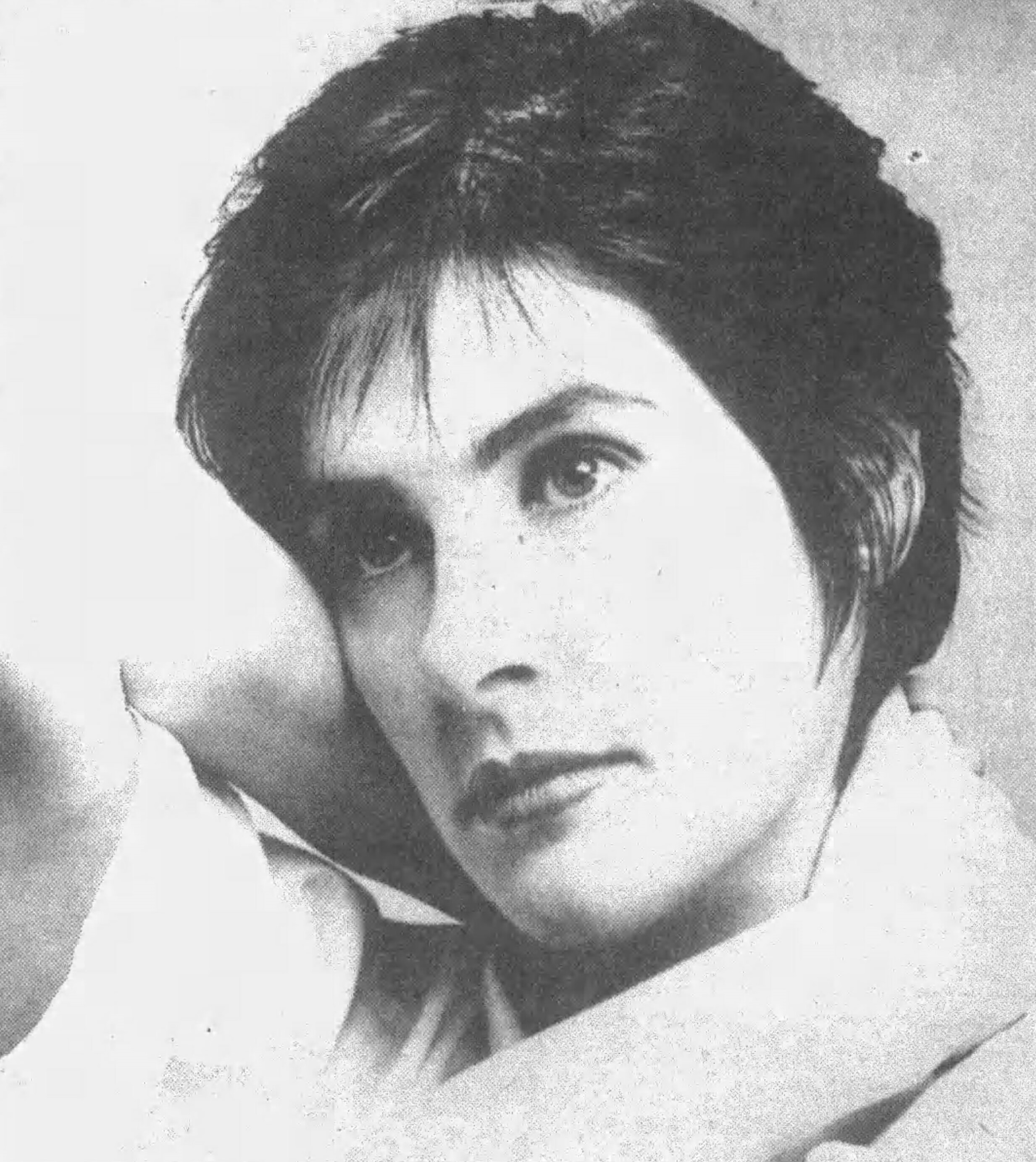
Enya

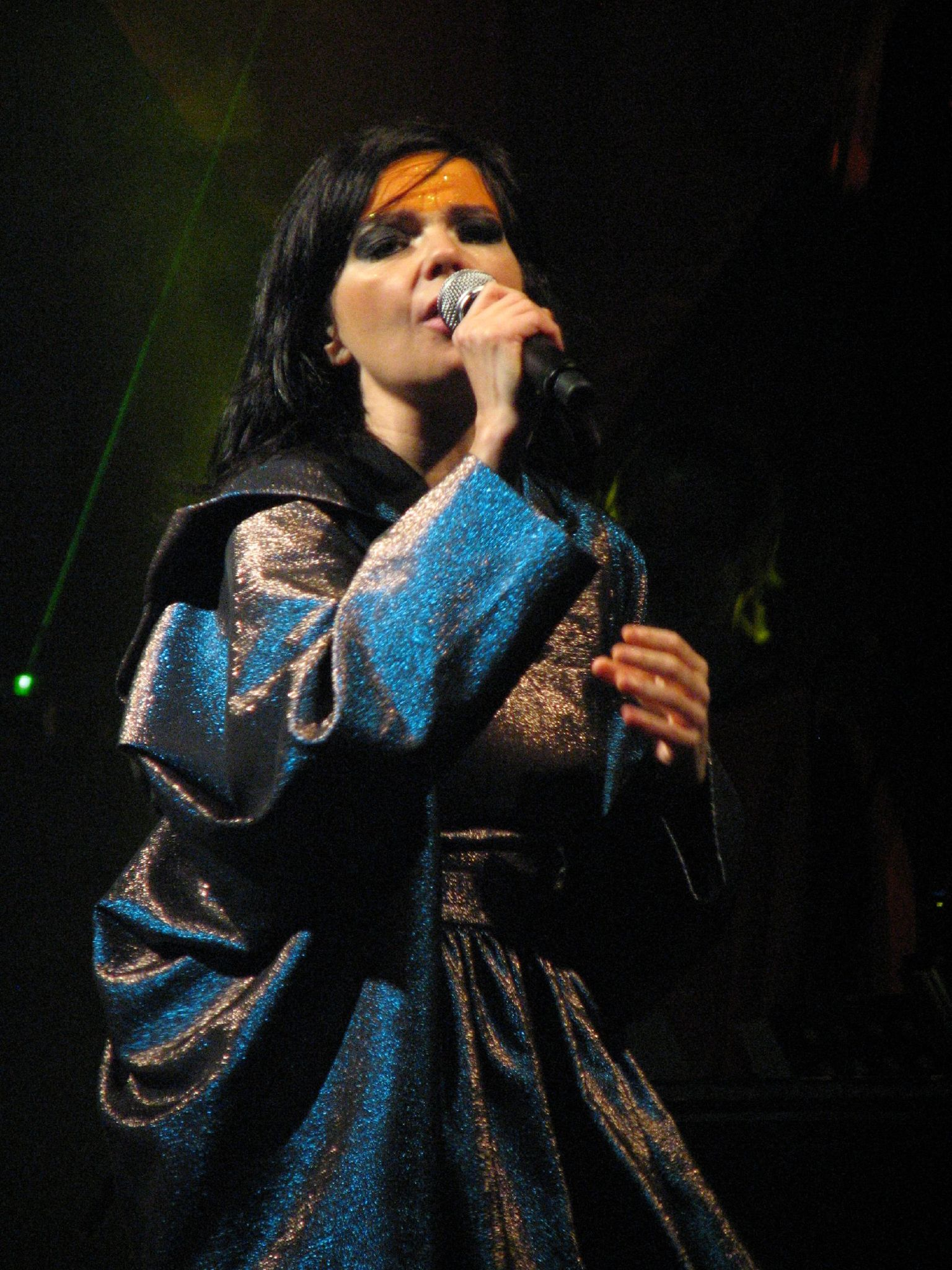
Björk

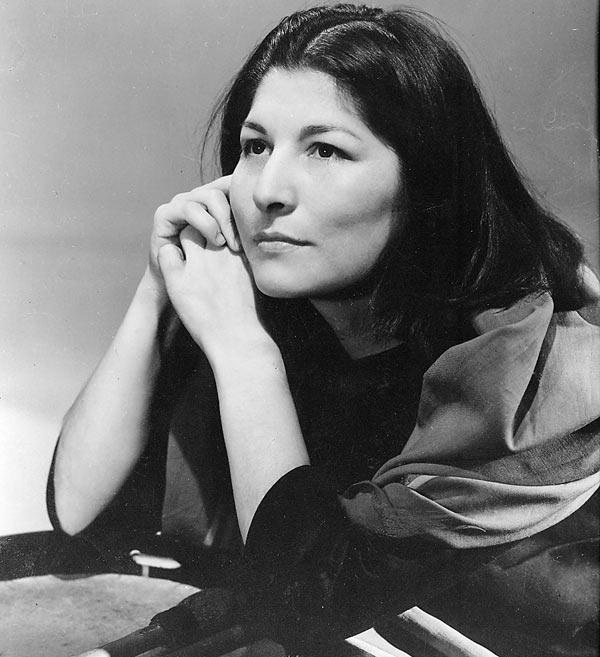
Mercedes Sosa

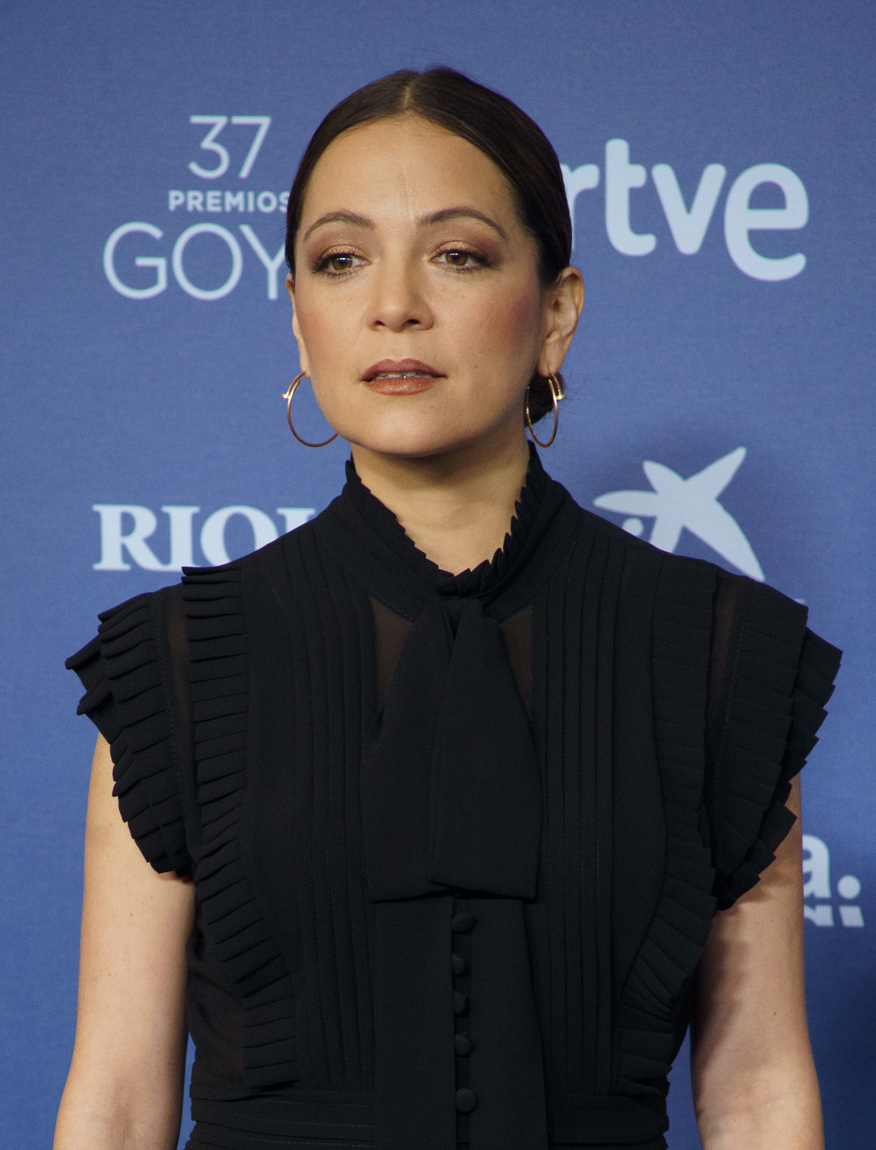
Natalia Lafourcade

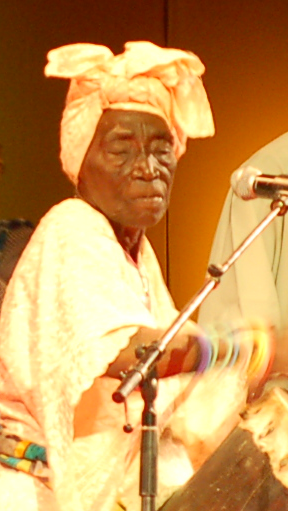
Bi Kidude

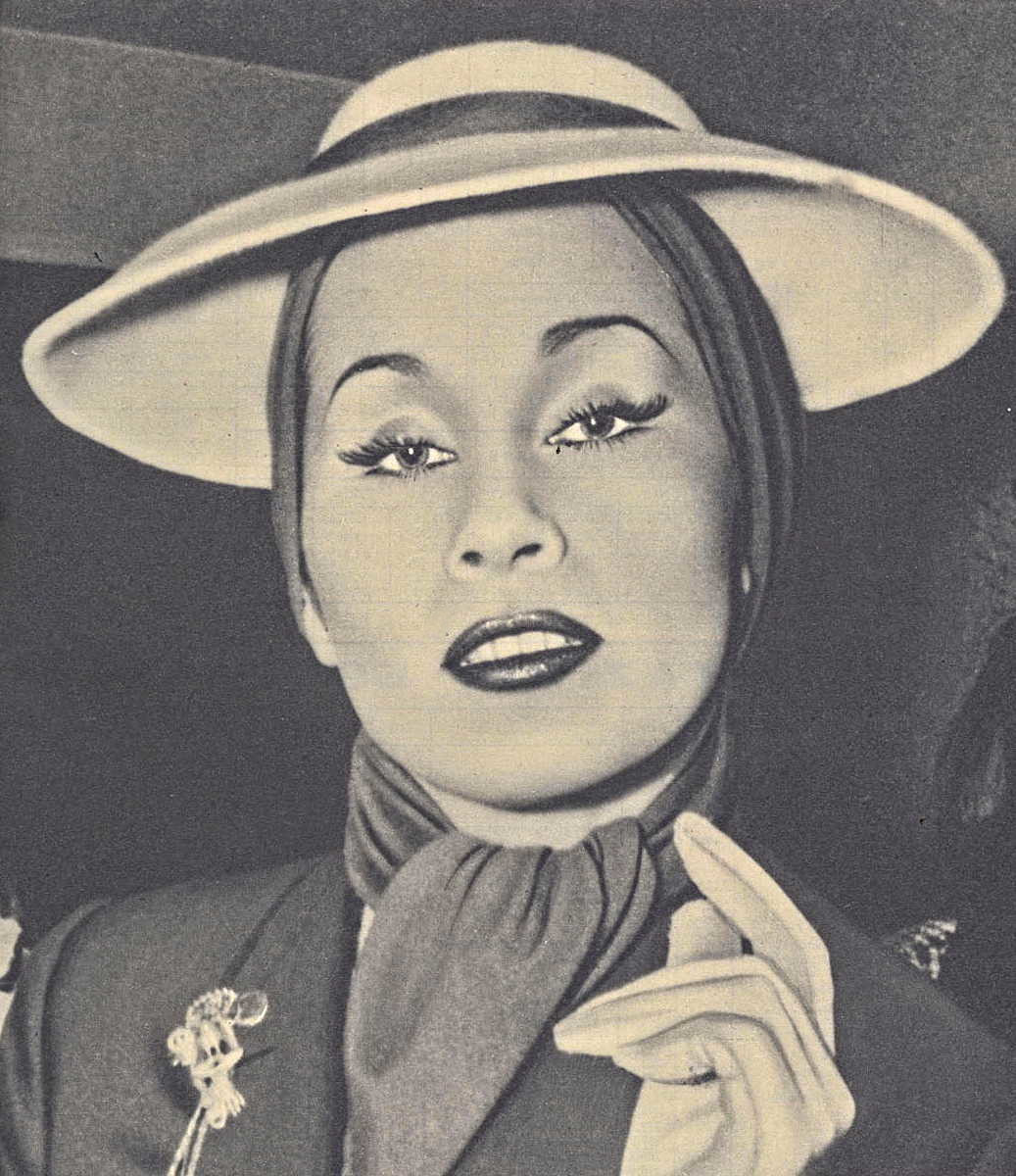
Yma Sumac

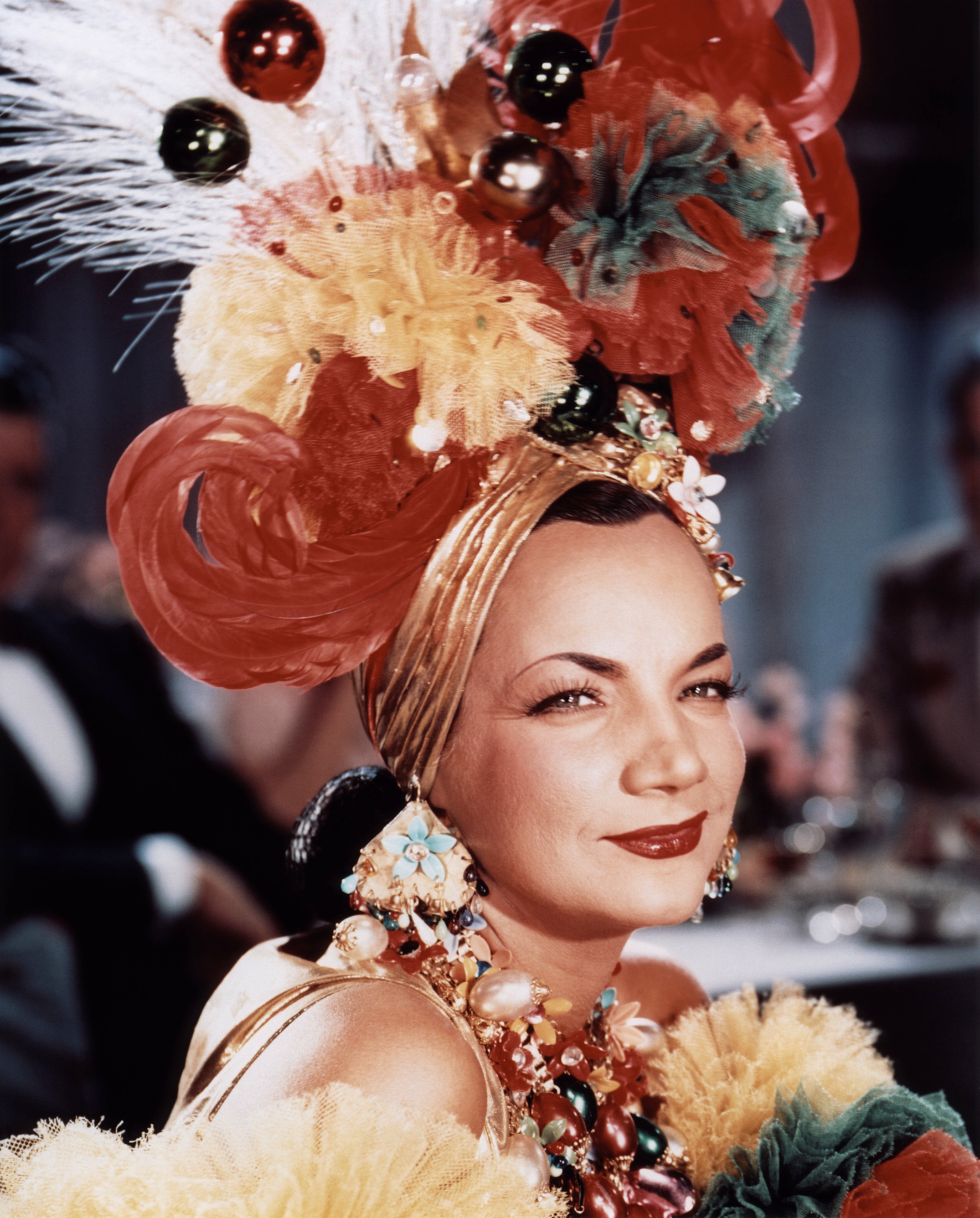
Carmen Miranda

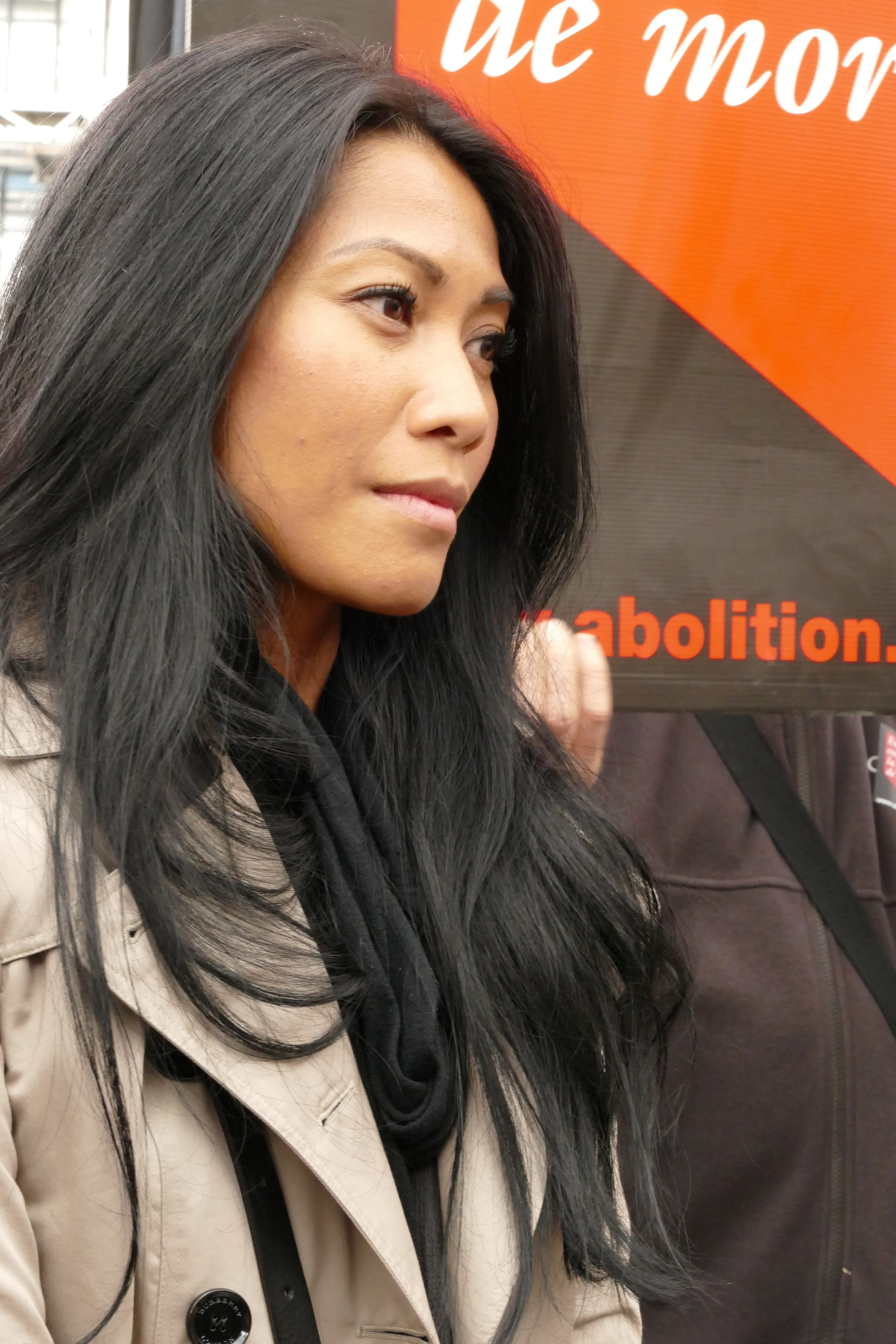
Anggun

Examples of world music icons

Women play an important role in world music, a musical category encompassing many different styles of music from around the world, including ethnic music and traditional music from Africa, the Caribbean, South America, Asia, and other regions; indigenous music; neotraditional music; and music in which more than one cultural tradition intermingle, such as mixtures of Western pop and ethnic music). The term was popularized in the 1980s as a marketing category for non-Western traditional music.

Brazilian actress, singer, and dancer Carmen Miranda became known in the West as an exotic supplement in Hollywood films in the 1930s, akin to dancer Josephine Baker before and exotica Yma Sumac after. In the 1960s, Elis Regina was the most prominent woman bossa nova singer, influencing popular music around the world. In the 1960s and 1970s, Argentinian folk singer Mercedes Sosa, South African Miriam Makeba, and Greek Maria Farantouri were recognized for their engagement against the oppressive political situations in their home countries. Sosa's "Gracias a la vida" ("Thanks to Life"), Makeba's "Pata Pata" ("Touch, Touch"), and Maria Farantouri's collaboration with composer Mikis Theodorakis (especially the "Mauthausen Trilogy") were musical icons of the struggle for human rights. The "Queen of Salsa" Celia Cruz emigrated from Cuba to the United States in 1966.

With the rising interest in the then-so-called world music in the 1980s, old recordings of long established artists were re-discovered for a global audience and distributed worldwide; well known in their home country, like Arabic singers Umm Kulthum and Asmahan; Fairuz, Algerian raï singer Cheikha Rimitti; Asha Bhosle—an Indian playback singer for Bollywood film soundtracks; Romani Esma Redžepova; Mexican ranchera singer Chavela Vargas; and the Mahotella Queens from South Africa; or they were recorded for the first time (by Caucasian males) like Cesária Évora from Cape Verde, Stella Chiweshe from Zimbabwe, and Afro-Peruvian Susana Baca.

There are many women world music performers, including: Ann Savoy; Bi Kidude; Brenda Fassie; Chabuca Granda; Chava Alberstein; Cleoma Breaux Falcon; Dolly Collins; Elizabeth Cotten; Frehel; Gal Costa; Genoa Keawe; Googoosh; Hazel Dickens; Jean Ritchie; Lata Mangeshkar; Leah Song; Lola Beltrán; Lucha Reyes; Lucilla Galeazzi (The Mammas); Lydia Mendoza; Maria Tanase; Mariam Doumbia; Nada Mamula; Ofra Haza; Oumou Sangare; Rita Marley; Rosa Passos; Roza Eskenazi; Safiye Ayla; Salamat Sadikova; Selda Bagcan; Shirley Collins; Valya Balkanska; Violeta Parra; Warda; Marta Gómez; and Zap Mama.

== Eastern music ==
=== Arabic music ===
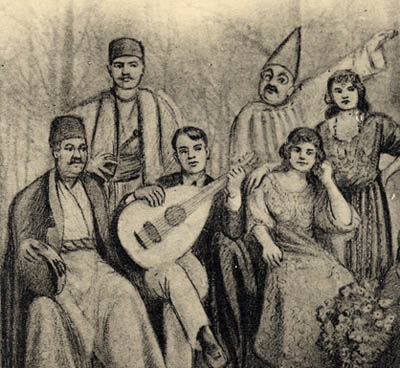
A group of musicians, including women performers, from a Baghdad musical theater group in the 1920s

Arabic music is an amalgam of the music of the Arab people in the Arabian Peninsula and the music of all the varied peoples that make up the Arab world.

During the Medieval Era, women professional musicians were called awalim (plural) or al'meh, which means a '"learned female." These singers were often hired on the occasion of a celebration in the harem of a wealthy person. They were not with the harem but in an elevated room that was concealed by a screen so as not to be seen by either the harem or the master of the house. The female awalim were more highly paid than male performers and more highly regarded.

Male professional musicians during this period in Egypt were called alateeyeh (plural), or alatee (singular), which means "a player upon an instrument." However, this name applies to both vocalists as well as instrumentalists. Male professional musicians were considered disreputable and lowly, and they earned their living playing at parties. In the 9th century, the use of male instrumentalists was harshly criticized in a treatise because the men were associated with perceived vices such as playing chess and writing love poetry.

Centuries later, in one of the reports commissioned by Napoleon after the invasion of Egypt on the state of Ottoman culture, mention is made that there were guilds of male instrumentalists who played to male audiences and "learned female" singer/musicians who sang and played for women audiences.

=== Chinese music ===
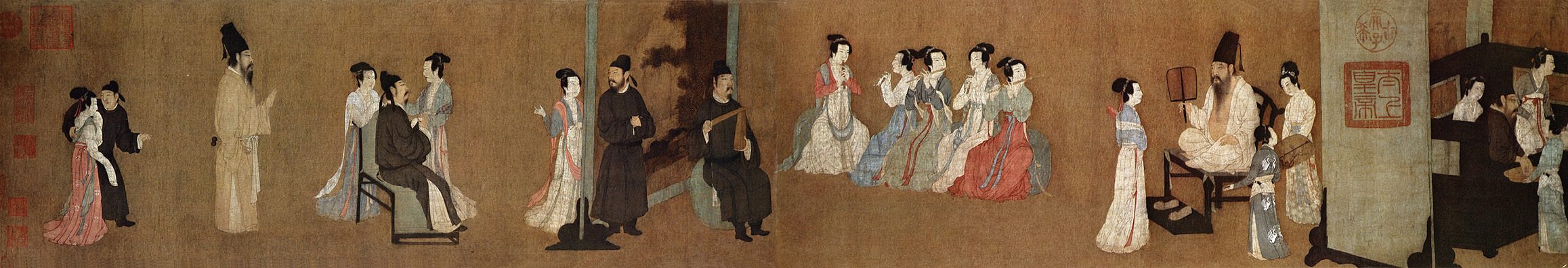
A half-section of the Song dynasty (960–1279) version of the Night Revels of Han Xizai, original by Gu Hongzhong; the woman musicians in the center of the image are playing transverse bamboo flutes and guan, and the male musician, a wooden clapper called paiban

In Chinese music of ancient times, music was a major activity for women, especially learned women. Since ancient times, women performers were associated with the guqin—a seven-string Chinese musical instrument of the zither family that is plucked. The guqin has traditionally been considered by scholars and literati as an instrument of great subtlety and refinement. One notable woman guqin player was Cai Wenji, associated with the piece Hujia Shiba-pai 《胡笳十八拍》.

Women musicians have also played a key role in Chinese folk music. In southern Fujian and Taiwan, Nanyin or Nanguan music is a genre of traditional Chinese folk ballads sung by a woman accompanied by a xiao flute and a pipa, as well as other traditional instruments. The music is sung in the Minnan topolect—that is, regional dialect. The music is generally sorrowful and typically deals with the topic of a love-stricken woman.

The Chinese pop (C-pop) music industry in the 1930s and 1940s was dominated by the Seven Great Singing Stars, who were the most renowned singers of China during that period: Zhou Xuan, Gong Qiuxia, Yao Lee, and Bai Hong emerged in the 1930s; afterwards Bai Guang, Li Xianglan and Wu Yingyin in the 1940s. After 1949, the early generations of C-pop were denounced by the Chinese Communist Party as yellow music, sexually indecent (the color yellow is associated in China with eroticism and sex). Only after the end of the Cultural Revolution by the early 1980s could yellow music be performed again.

After China's extensive political and cultural changes in modern times, its popular music has increasingly emulated and taken inspiration from the styles of popular music of South Korea (K-pop) and Japan (J-pop), both of which it now closely resembles. As such, during the 2010s several girl groups were established based on both the Japanese model, such as SNH48 (created in 2012) and its sister groups, and the Korean model, such as Rocket Girls (created in 2018 from the Chinese version of a Korean reality television talent competition show). These groups have achieved significant success, with the debut EP of Rocket Girls selling over 1.6 million copies.

Despite this, solo Chinese woman artists continue to be much more popular overall in the country, as they have traditionally been. Some of the most recently popular solo Chinese woman singers include Faye Wong; G.E.M. Gloria Tang; Lala Hsu; 胡66; Ada Zhuang; Kelly Yu; Chen Li (陳粒); Feng Timo; Bibi Zhou; Shuangsheng (双笙); Tia Ray; Vanessa Jin (金玟岐); and Jane Zhang.

=== Indian music ===
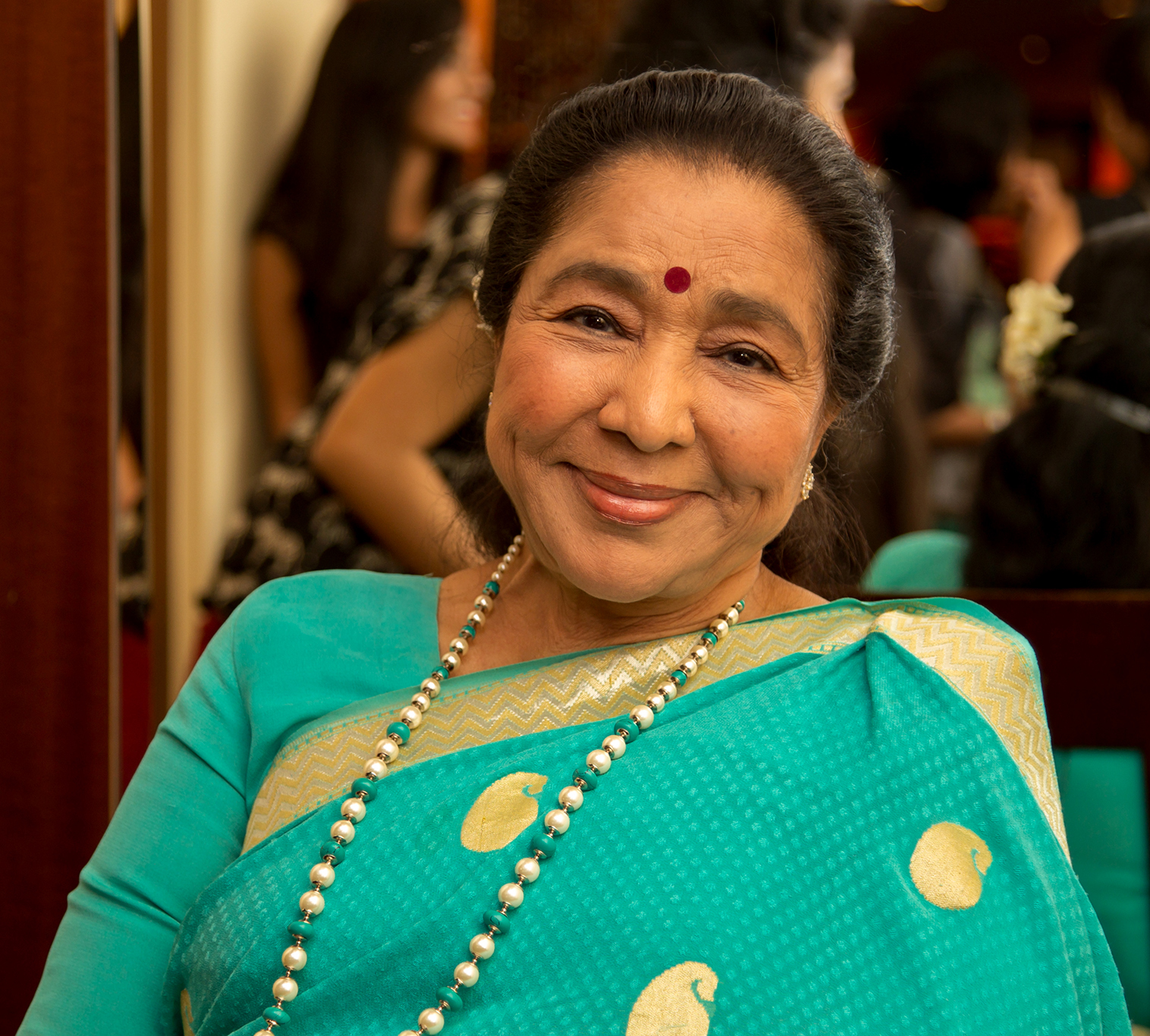
Asha Bhosle is an Indian singer best known as a playback singer in Hindi cinema. In 2011, she was officially acknowledged by the Guinness Book of World Records as the most-recorded artist in music history.

Indian classical music is the art music of the Indian subcontinent. The origins of Indian classical music can be found in the Hindu chants. This chanting style evolved into jatis and eventually into ragas.

Indian classical music has also been significantly influenced by, or syncretised with, Indian folk music. The major composers from the historical Indian classical music tradition were men. In Indian folk music, lavani is a music genre popular in Maharashtra traditionally performed by women. Bhangra (Punjabi: ਭੰਗੜਾ) is a form of dance-oriented folk music of Punjab. The present musical style is derived from non-traditional musical accompaniment to the riffs of Punjab called by the same name. The female dance of the Punjab region is known as Giddha (ਗਿੱਧਾ).

Modern women vocalists include D. K. Pattammal; M. S. Subbalakshmi; Gangubai Hangal; Hirabai Barodekar; Kesarbai Kerkar; Kishori Amonkar; Malini Rajurkar; Mogubai Kurdikar; Prabha Atre; Roshan Ara Begum; and Shruti Sadolikar Katkar. One woman instrumentalist is Annapurna Devi.

In the music of Bollywood (the centre of India's film industry) and other regional film industries in India, women playback singers have had a significant role, with the sisters Lata Mangeshkar and Asha Bhosle, who have mainly worked in Hindi films, often referred to as two of the best-known and most prolific playback singers in India. In 2011, Bhosle was officially acknowledged by the Guinness Book of World Records as the most recorded artist in music history.

=== Iranian music ===
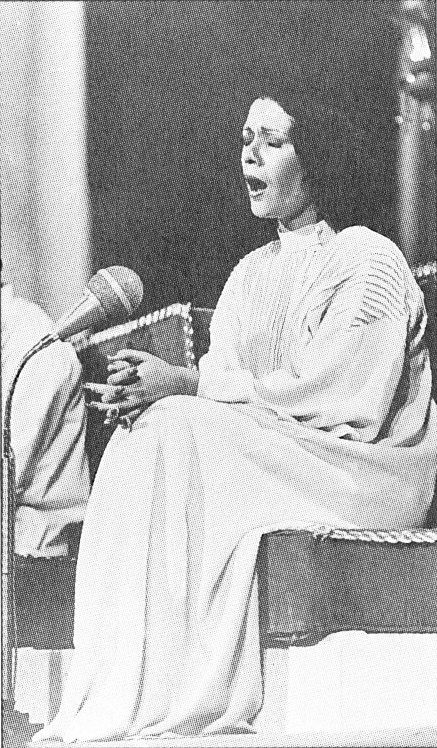
Fātemeh Vā'ezi (Persian: فاطمه واعظی), commonly known by her stage name Parīsā (Persian: پریسا), is a Persian classical vocalist and musician

Traditionally, it has been difficult for woman singers to appear publicly in Iran. Women were allowed to perform only for ta'ziyeh religious rituals, and men were generally forbidden to listen to women. Before the Iranian Revolution, women could sing only in certain circumstances: in private, while working, for other women, or during women's celebrations. Since the Revolution, however, women have been permitted to perform as solo vocalists for female audiences and for male audiences as a part of a chorus.

Qamar ol-Molouk Vaziri (1905–1959) was one of the first woman masters of Persian music. Other noted woman musicians include Delkash; Simin Ghanem; Maryam Akhondy, founder of Barbad Ensemble; Persian classical guitarist Lily Afshar; singer Shakila, winner of the Persian Academy Award; the conductor Soodabeh Salem; Afsaneh Rasaei; Pirayeh Pourafar, founder of Nava Ensemble and Lian Ensemble; and Mahsa Vahdat.

Classical singer Fatemeh Vaezi (commonly known by her stage name Parisa) has given concerts accompanied by a female orchestra. After 1986 Maryam Akhondy started working with other Iranian musicians in exile, and in 2000 created the all-woman a cappella group Banu, which sang old folk songs that were part of women's activities and celebrations. Singer Sima Bina has taught many female students; Ghashang Kamkar, both male and female. She and Vaezi have criticized the patriarchal power structure in Iran for its treatment of woman musicians.

Iranian folk-music performers include Sima Bina; Darya Dadvar; Monika Jalili; Ziba Shirazi; Zohreh Jooya; and Shushā Guppy. Iranian pop performers include Googoosh; Hayedeh; Mahasti; Leila Forouhar; Pooran; and Laleh Pourkarim. Iranian world music performers include Azam Ali and Cymin Samawatie.

=== Japanese music ===
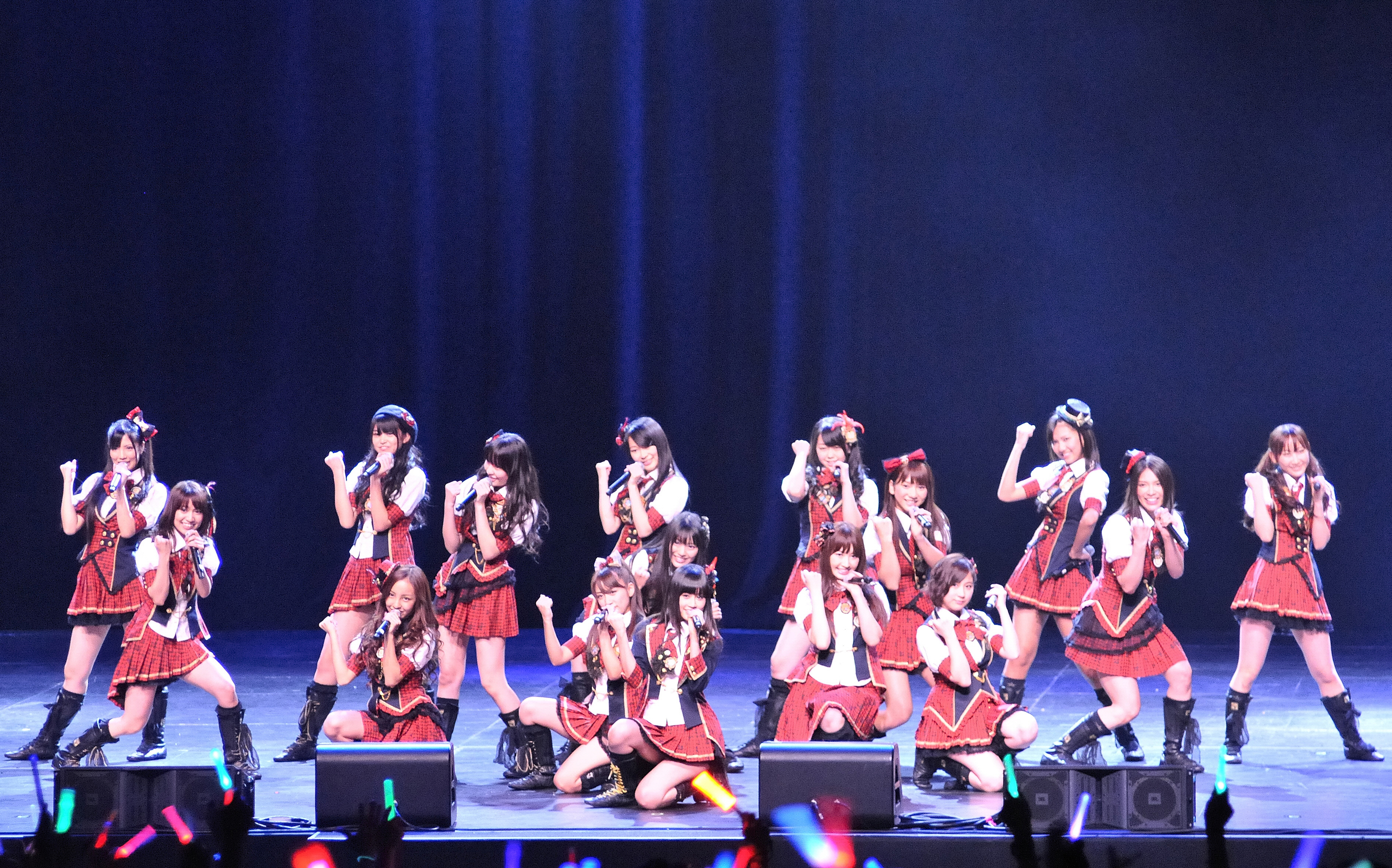
The Japanese idol girl group AKB48 is the best-selling act in Japan by number of singles sold.

Japan has the world's largest physical music market, with US $2 billion in 2014 and the second largest overall music market, with a total retail value of 2.6 billion dollars in 2014. Japanese idol women artists dominate the physical singles market, with 9 out of the top 10 best-selling singles in the country in 2015 belonging to either the idol girl group AKB48 or its "sister" and "rival" groups. AKB48 has had the best-selling singles of the year in the country for the past six years, and the group is also the best-selling act in Japan by number of singles sold. Japanese American singer and songwriter Hikaru Utada has the best-selling album in the country, First Love.

=== Jewish music ===
There is literary evidence from biblical books such as The Book of Judges that women (including Miriam, Deborah, and Hannah), participated in musical traditions that included singing lamentations and playing instruments. However, women are not mentioned in references to liturgy. Women were eventually banned from liturgical worship (kolisha). Though they would continue to have a role in the musical rituals of the domestic sphere at home, burials, and weddings, these customs were not documented as were liturgical music, and its creators and performers.

== Music scholars and educators ==
=== Musicologists and music historians ===
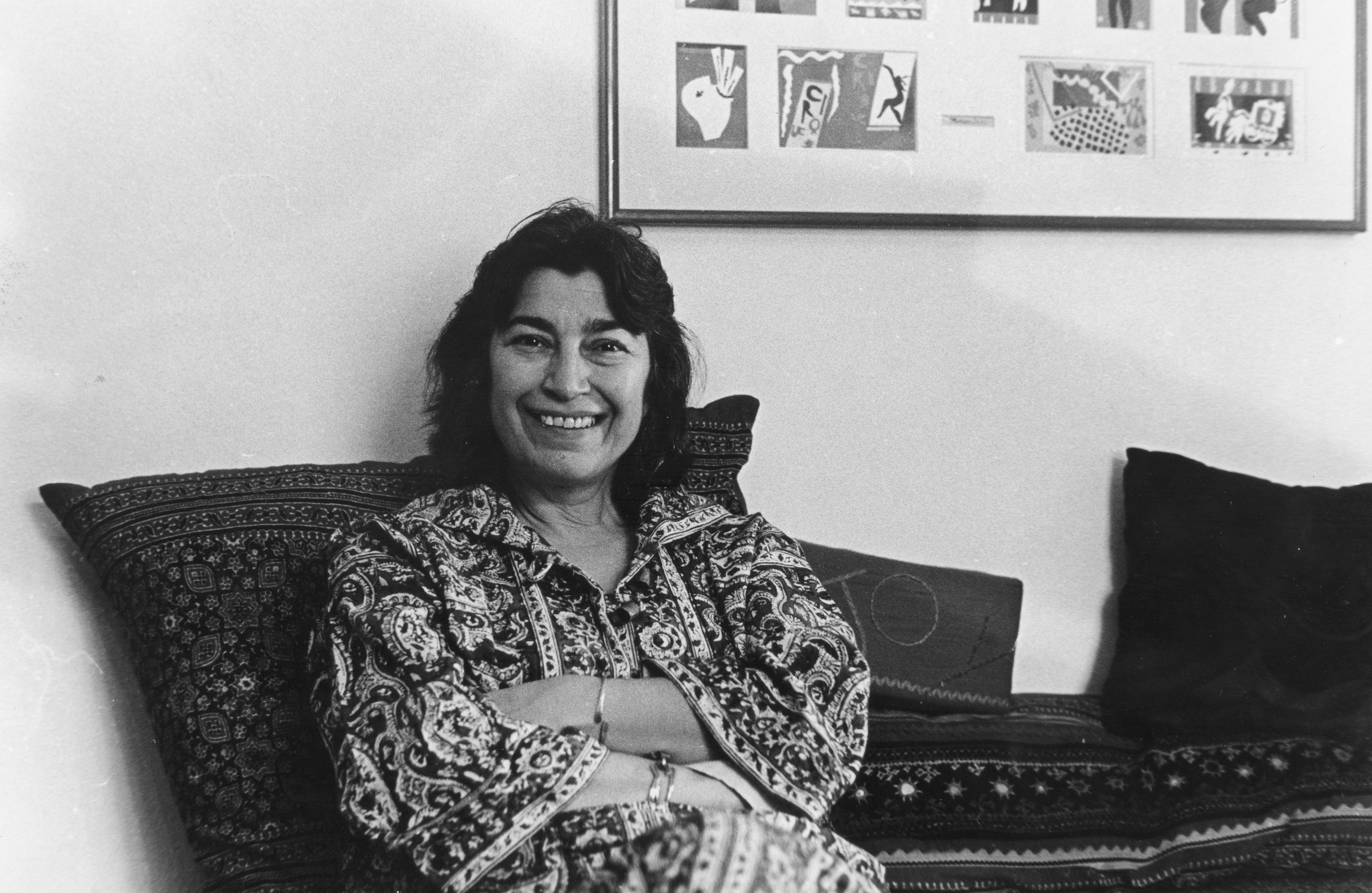
Rosetta Reitz (1924–2008) was an American jazz historian and feminist who established a record label producing 18 albums of the music of the early women of jazz and the blues

Although the vast majority of major musicologists and music historians have been men. some women musicologists have reached the profession's top ranks.

Susan McClary is a musicologist associated with new musicology who incorporates feminist music criticism in her work. She holds a PhD from Harvard University. One of her best known works is Feminine Endings (1991), covering musical constructions of gender and sexuality; gendered aspects of traditional music theory; gendered sexuality in musical narrative; music as a gendered discourse; and issues affecting women musicians. In her book, McClary suggests that the sonata form (used in symphonies and string quartets) may be a sexist or misogynistic procedure that constructs of gender and sexual identity. In her Conventional Wisdom (2000), she argues that the traditional musicological assumption of the existence of "purely musical" elements, divorced from culture and meaning, the social and the body, is a conceit used to veil the social and political imperatives of the worldview that produces the classical canon most prized by supposedly objective musicologists.

Carolyn Abbate, an American musicologist who received her PhD from Princeton University, has been described by the Harvard Gazette as "one of the world's most accomplished and admired music historians."

Other women scholars in musicology and music history include:

- Eva Badura-Skoda
- Margaret Bent
- Suzanne Cusick
- Ursula Günther
- Maud Cuney Hare
- Liudmila Kovnatskaya
- Kendra Preston Leonard
- Rosetta Reitz
- Elaine Sisman
- Hedi Stadlen
- Rose Rosengard Subotnik
- Anahit Tsitsikian

=== Ethnomusicologists ===
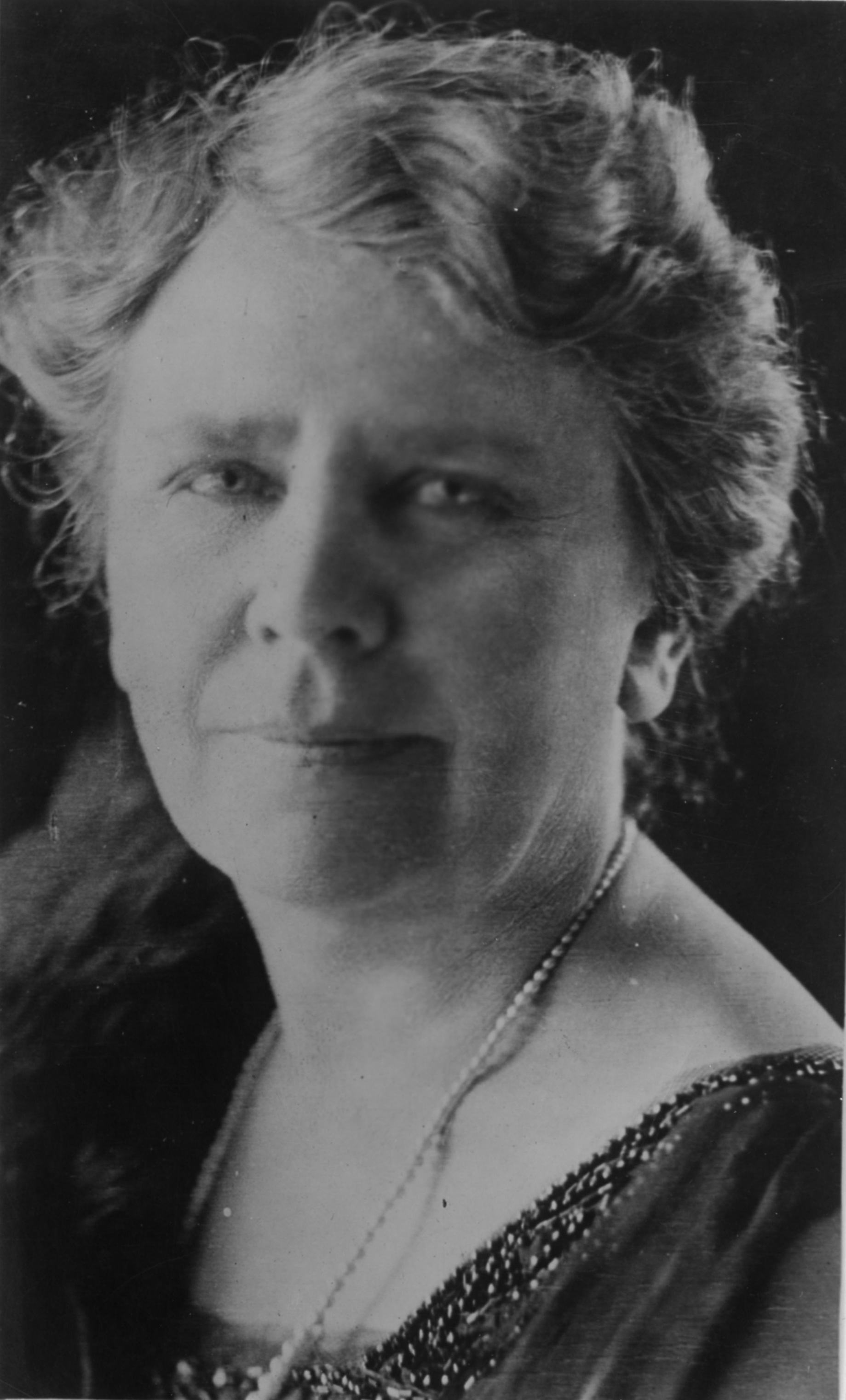
Frances Densmore (1867–1957) was an American anthropologist and ethnographer known for her studies of Native American music and culture

Ethnomusicologists study the many musics around the world that emphasize their cultural, social, material, cognitive, biological, and other dimensions or contexts instead of, or in addition to, its isolated sound component or any particular repertoire. Ethnomusicology—a term coined by Jaap Kunst from the Greek words ἔθνος (ethnos, 'nation') and μουσική (mousike, "music")—is often described as the anthropology or ethnography of music. Initially, it was almost exclusively oriented toward non-Western music, but now includes the study of Western music from anthropological, sociological, and intercultural perspectives.

Women have made significant contributions in ethnomusicology, especially in the intersection of gender studies and ethnomusicology. Ellen Koskoff, professor emerita at the Eastman School of Music, past president of the Society for Ethnomusicology and host of a radio show called "What in the World is Music?", has done extensive work on this. In Women and Music in Cross-Cultural Perspective (1987), Koskoff argues that music performed by women is "devalued" and in some cases, even considered "non-music" despite having "musical form." She goes on to explain that the distinction between men—occupying public spheres—and women—occupying private, domestic ones—has created two complementary, not different, halves of culture, and that because women's identity is widely believed to be embedded in their sexuality, "one of the most common associations between women and music... links women's primary sexual identity and role with music performance." In this association, Koskoff finds four types of music performance emerge in connection with inter-gender relations and the established social/sexual arrangement:

- one that confirms and maintains it
- one that appears to maintain it so as to protect other more relevant values
- one that protests but maintains it (often symbolically)
- one that challenges and threatens it

Deborah Wong, a professor at the University of California, Riverside, is known for her focus on the music of Southeast Asia and Asian American music-making, and has also studied taiko, or Japanese American drumming.

Other women ethnomusicologists include:

- Judith Becker
- Frances Densmore
- Ida Halpern
- Maud Karpeles
- Janet E. Tobitt
- Katherine Hagedorn

=== Music educators ===
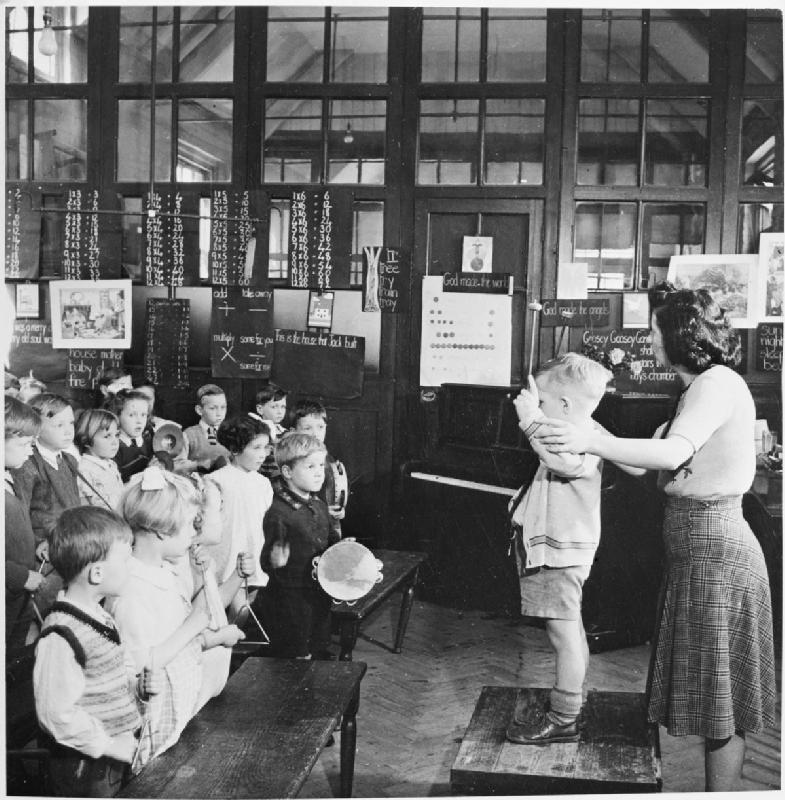
A music teacher leading a music ensemble in an elementary school in 1943

Although music critics argued in the 1880s that "women lacked the innate creativity to compose good music" due to "biological predisposition," later it was accepted that women would have a role in music education. They became so involved in this field that from the latter half of the 19th century well into the 20th, they dominated it. Yet at least in the US, studies of women's contributions in music education have been overlooked because of an emphasis on bands and the top echelon of leaders in hierarchical music organizations. When looking further, however, women have had many music education roles in the "home, community, churches, public schools, and teacher-training institutions" and "as writers, patrons, and through their volunteer work in organizations."

Despite the limitations imposed on women's roles in music education in the 19th century, women were accepted as teachers in kindergarten, because this was deemed to be a "private sphere." Women also taught music privately as well as in girl's schools and Sunday schools. They also trained musicians in school music programs. By the turn of the 20th century, women began to be employed as music supervisors in elementary schools, teachers in normal schools, and professors of music in universities. Women also became more active in professional organizations in music education, and presented papers at conferences.

Women music educators "outnumber men two-to-one" in teaching general music, choir, private lessons, and keyboard instruction. More men tend to be hired as for band education, administration, and jazz jobs, however, and to work in colleges and universities. According to Dr. Sandra Wieland Howe, there is still a "glass ceiling" for women in music education careers, as there is "stigma" associated with women in leadership positions and "men outnumber women as administrators."

Noted women music educators include:

- Frances Clarke (1860–1958) founded the Music Supervisors National Conference (MSNC) in 1907. Even though a small number of women served as president of the MSNC and the following renamed versions of the organization over the next century, in the 20th century, there were only two woman presidents between 1952 and 1992, which "[p]ossibly reflects discrimination." After 1990, however, leadership roles for women in the organization opened up; and from 1990 to 2010, there were five woman presidents.
- Julia Crane (1855–1923) was an American music educator who set up a school, the Crane School of Music in Potsdam, New York, the first school specifically for the training of public school music teachers. As of 2015, the Crane School of Music is one of three schools that make up the State University of New York (SUNY) at Potsdam, with 630 undergraduate and 30 graduate students and a faculty of 70 teachers and professional staff. Crane is among the most important figures in the history of American music education. A student of Manuel García, she was inducted into the Music Educators Hall of Fame in 1986.
- Cornelia Schröder-Auerbach (1900–1997), a musician, musicologist, pianist, and organist, studied musicology at the University of Breslau, the Ludwig-Maximilians-Universität München, the University of Jena, and the University of Freiburg, where she received her doctorate in musicology in 1928, supervised by Wilibald Gurlitt. She was the first woman to graduate with a doctorate in this field. With Peter Harlan and her husband, the composer Hanning Schröder, she founded the Harlan Trio for historically informed performances in 1930, path-breaking for this new genre, based also on her research in clavichord music and compositions. With the Nazi takeover of the German government and its anti-semitic discriminations, the non-observant Protestant Schröder-Auerbach was banned in 1934 from publicly performing because her four grandparents had been Jewish. From early 1944 on, under veiled so-called Aryan identity she restarted public music performances in Dargun as the church organist, choirmaster, and music teacher, also networking in the music chapter of the Mecklenburg state association of the Cultural Association of the GDR. In 1952 she joined the East German Academy of Arts in East Berlin, where she rebuilt the music archive that had been lost in 1945 with the destruction of the predecessor Prussian Academy of Arts; but since she lived in the American Sector of Berlin, the East German Academy dismissed her in 1959. She also worked as author, lexicographer, and music critic for the Berliner Börsen-Courier, radio stations, and the Deutsche Grammophon.
- Carolynn Lindeman (born 1940) graduated from Oberlin College Conservatory of Music, the Mozarteum Academy, San Francisco State University and Stanford University, where she received her Doctor of Musical Arts. She was a professor at San Francisco State University from 1973 to 2005 and president of the Music Educators National Conference from 1996 to 1998. She edited the Strategies for Teaching series. She "[a]cknowledge[d gender] discrimination in academia."
- June Hinckley (1943–2007) graduated with a PhD from Florida State University. She was a music and fine arts supervisor in Brevard County, Florida. She wrote articles on music education and was president of the Music Educators National Conference from 1998 to 2000.
- Lynn Brinckmeyer received her PhD from the University of Kansas. She was an associate professor and director of choral music education at Texas State University. and president of the Music Educators National Conference from 2006 to 2008.
- Barbara Geer graduated from the University of North Carolina. She was a music consultant for a school system in North Carolina and served as president of the Music Educators National Conference from 2008 to 2010.
- Grace Harriet Spofford (1887–1974) was an American music educator and administrator. She graduated from Smith College in 1909, and later from the Peabody Conservatory of Music with degrees in piano (1913) and organ (1916). Her first position in education was directly after her time at Smith, teaching piano at Heidelberg College (now Heidelberg University). After attending Peabody, Spofford became a piano teacher and later an administrator there. From 1924 to 1931, she was the first dean of the Curtis Institute of Music in Philadelphia; and from 1935 to 1954, she was the director of the Henry Street Settlement's music school. She was largely responsible for commissioning The Second Hurricane, a play-opera by Aaron Copland and Edwin Denby. After retirement, Spofford was involved with international music relations. Between 1954 and 1963, she served as chairman of music of the International Council of Women three times, during which the council sponsored the recording of orchestral works by five women composers: Mabel Wheeler Daniels, Miriam Gideon, Mary Howe, Julia Perry, and Louise Talma. In 1964 and 1966, Spofford was a delegate to the International Music Council. She received an honor from the National Federation of Music Clubs for "distinguished service to music in the field of human rights" in 1968.
- Sharon Isbin was a multiple Grammy Award-winning classical guitarist. In 1989, she created the Master of Music degree, Graduate Diploma and Artist Diploma for classical guitar at the Juilliard School, making history by becoming their first guitar faculty member and the founding director of the Guitar Department. She added the Bachelor of Music degree and Undergraduate Diploma to the program in 2007, and the Doctor of Musical Arts in 2018. Isbin has appeared as soloist with over 200 orchestras, and has commissioned more concertos than any other guitarist. She is the author of the Classical Guitar Answer Book and the director of the Guitar Department at the Aspen Music Festival.

== Conducting ==
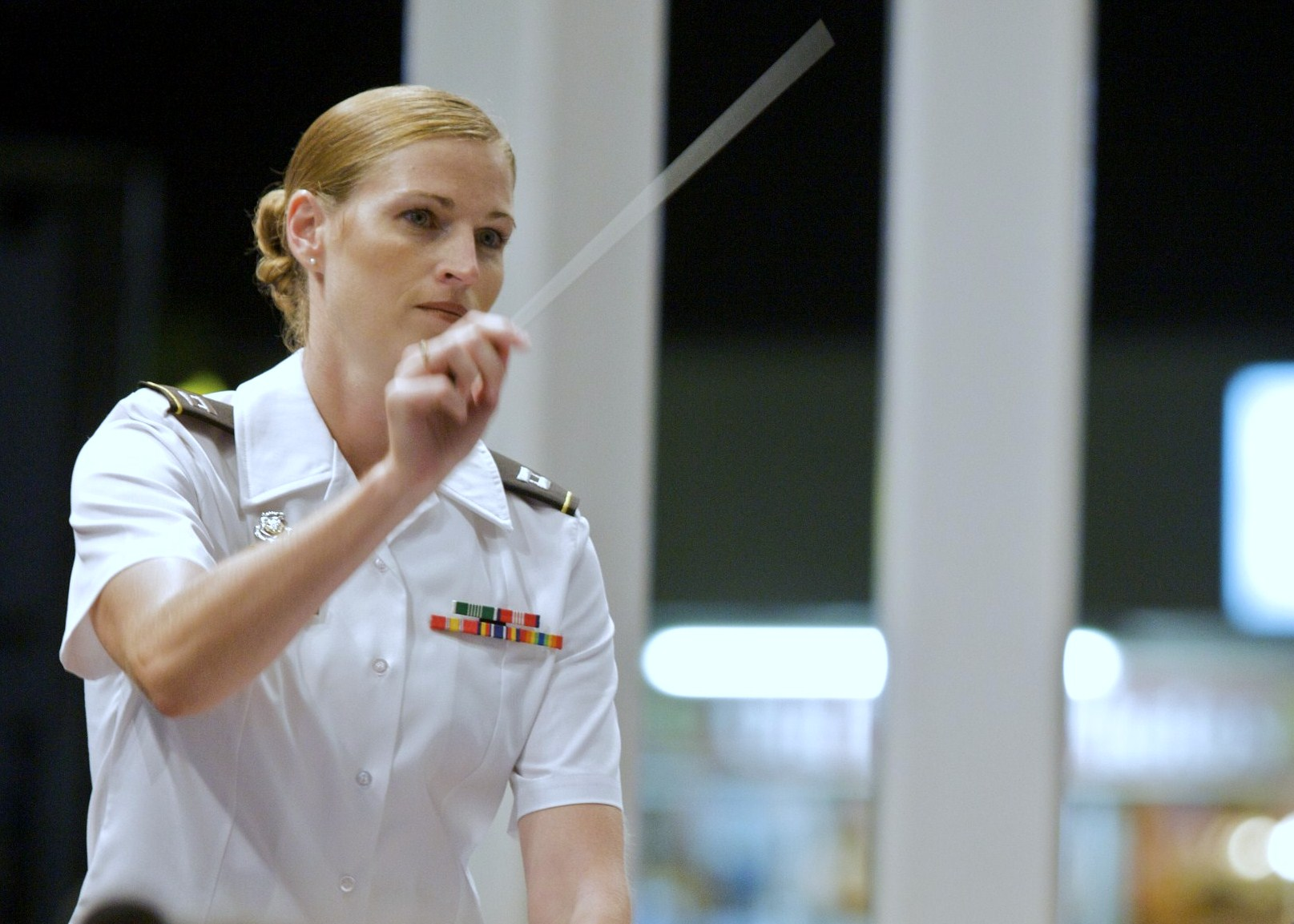
US Army Captain Sharon Toulouse leading a military music ensemble in 2008

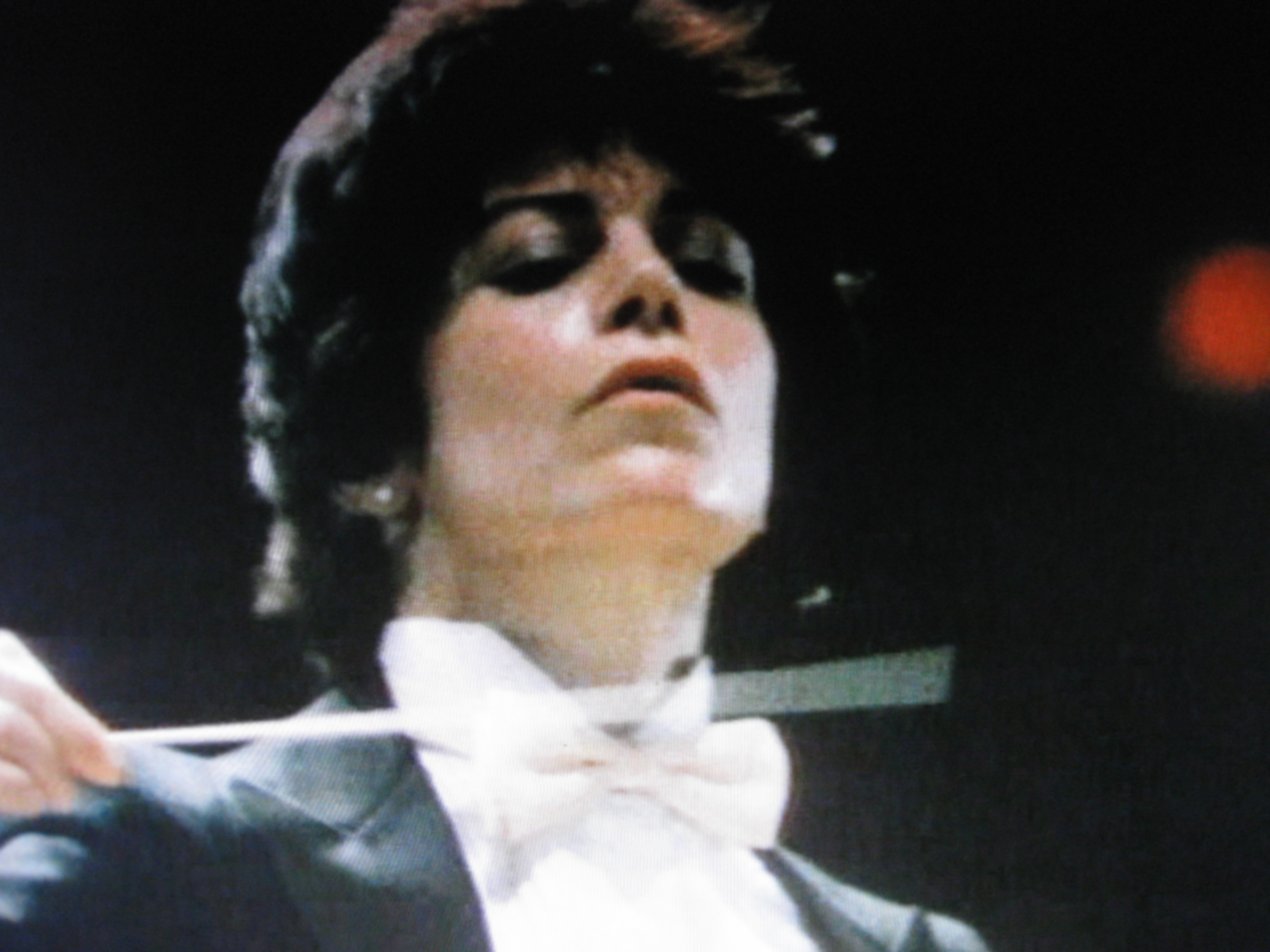
JoAnn Falletta conducting Rite of Spring

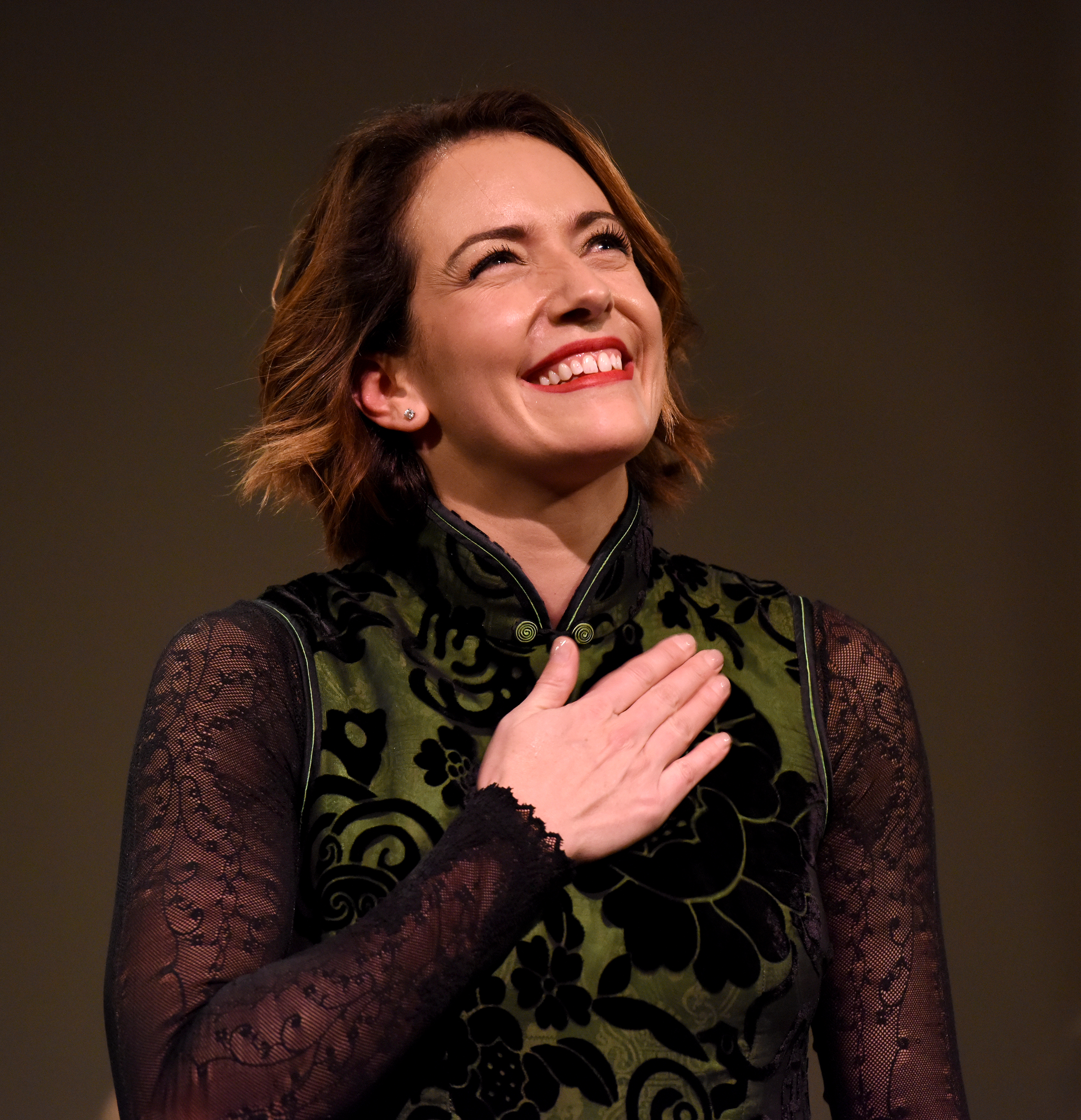
Alondra de la Parra

As the majority of professional orchestra conductors are male,The Guardian called conducting "one of the last glass ceilings in the music industry." According to the UK's Radio 3 editor, Edwina Wolstencroft: "The music world has been happy to have female performers ... for a long time ... But owning authority and power in public is another matter. That's where female conductors have had a hard time. Our society is more resistant to women being powerful in public than to women being entertaining."

Many women within the orchestrating profession experience forms of discrimination, whether it be gender, racial, or both. Women, initially, were not encouraged to play professionally because it was deemed inappropriate by society. Women were further considered neither strong nor skilled enough to play instruments other than the piano, or to survive grueling rehearsal schedules.

The low percentage of women conductors is not because women do not study conducting in music school; indeed, in 2009 and 2012 almost half of the recipients of conducting doctorates were women. As an example of the low overall ratio of women to men conductors, a 2013 article stated that in France, out of 574 concerts only 17 were conducted by women and no women conducted at the National Opéra in Paris. Bachtrack reported that in a list of the world's 150 top conductors that same year, only five were women.

A small number of woman conductors have become top-ranked international conductors, however. In January 2005, Australian conductor Simone Young became the first woman to conduct the Vienna Philharmonic. In 2008 Marin Alsop, a protégée of Leonard Bernstein, became the first woman to become the music director and principal conductor of a major US orchestra when she won the top job at the Baltimore Symphony. Despite "protests from a large swathe of the Baltimore Symphony when she was first named Music Director," since that time "plaudits [have] roll[ed] in." In 2014, Alsop became the first woman conductor to lead the Last Night of the Proms concert—one of the most important classical music events in Britain—in its 118-year history.

Whereas there is a lack of women in professional orchestra, more recent studies show that the conducting profession itself lacks gender and racial diversity. There is a clear distinction between the low number of white women in the field compared to that of white men, but an even lower number of other racial and ethnic identities. The proportion of non-white musicians represented in the orchestra workforce—and of African-American and Hispanic/Latino musicians in particular—remains extremely low. The orchestra field continues to remain predominantly white. Positions such as conductors, executives, and staff are dominated by white individuals: in particular, white males. In high-level executive positions, it remains rare to see women or people of color.

However, the gender gap narrowed in the early 1990s, with women musicians making up between 46% and 49% of the total musician pool in the two decades since. The years 1980 to 2014 saw a fourfold increase in the proportion of diverse musicians on stage, driven largely by an increase in musicians from Asian/Pacific Islander backgrounds. Over the years, more attention was brought to gender and racial disparity in the field and this has caused positive impacts in the orchestrating field. Data about conductors from 2006 to 2016 reveals a gradual but steady trend towards greater racial and ethnic diversity, with the percentage of African-American, Latino/Hispanic, Asian/Pacific Islander, American Indian/Alaskan Native, and other non-white conductors increasing from 15.7% in 2006 to 21% in 2016. Although there has been reconstruction of the whiteness and gender domination of males in the field, there is still work to be done.

Jeri Lynne Johnson was the first African-American woman to win an international conducting prize when she was awarded the Taki Concordia Conducting Fellowship in 2005. A graduate of Wellesley College and the University of Chicago, she is a conductor, composer, and pianist. She is the founder and music director of the Black Pearl Chamber Orchestra, the first multi-ethnic professional orchestra in Philadelphia. From 2001 to 2004, she was the assistant conductor of The Chamber Orchestra of Philadelphia. She has led orchestras around the world including the Colorado Symphony, Bournemouth Symphony (UK), and the Weimar Staatskapelle (Germany). Alongside prominent woman conductors Marin Alsop and JoAnn Falletta, Ms. Johnson was heralded on the NBC The Today Show as one of the nation's leading woman conductors.

== Music critics ==
=== Popular music ===
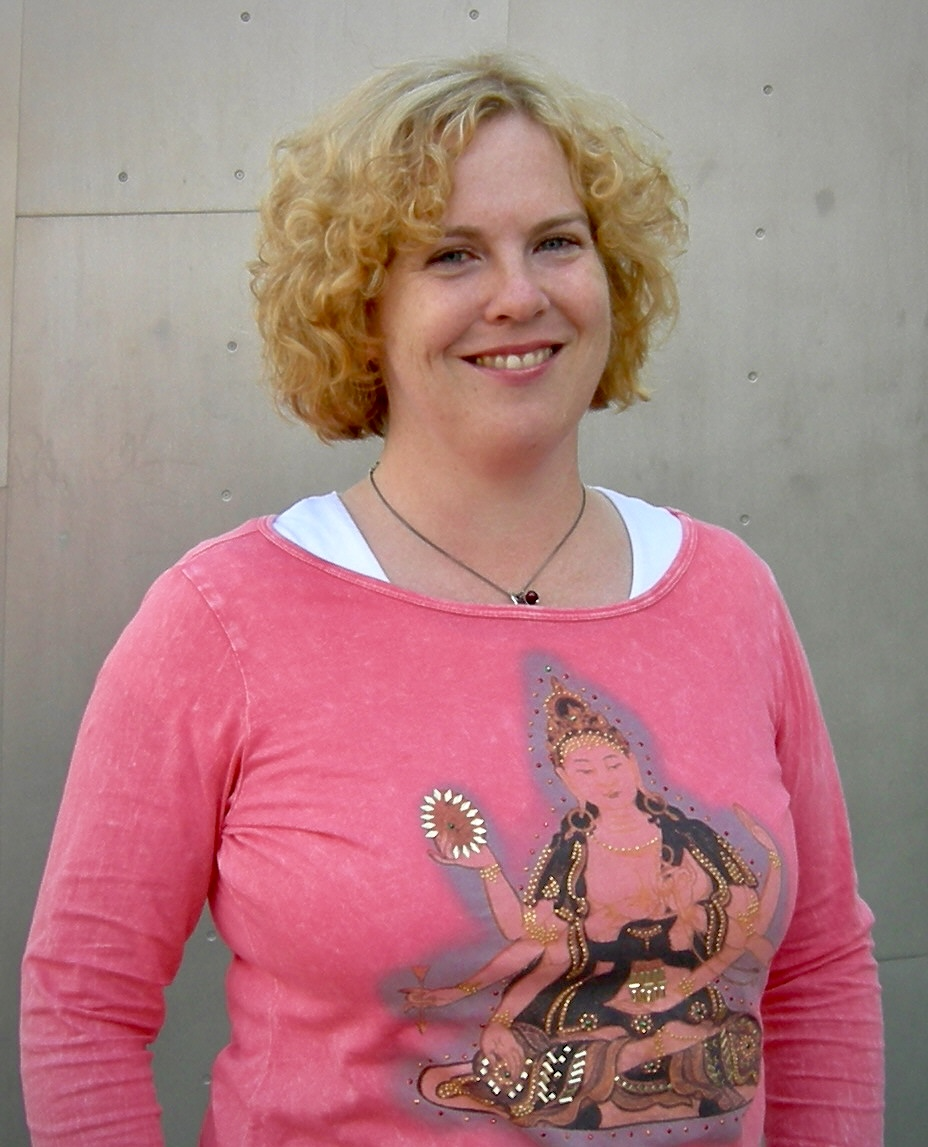
American pop music critic Ann Powers (pictured in 2007)

According to Holly Kruse, articles about pop music are usually written from "masculine subject positions." There are also relatively few women in music journalism; for instance, "by 1999, the number of female editors or senior writers at Rolling Stone hovered around... 15%."

Ann Powers, a woman music critic and journalist, appointed in 2006 as the chief pop-music critic for the Los Angeles Times, has critiqued the perceptions of sex in the music industry. Anwen Crawford, a writer for The Monthly, "explores women's long struggle for visibility and recognition in the field of rock criticism, even though we've been helping to pioneer it from the start." Noting that the "most famous rock-music critics... are all male," she comments that "[f]emale expertise, when it appears, is repeatedly dismissed as fraudulent. Every woman who has ever ventured an opinion on popular music could give you some variation [of this experience]."

=== Classical music ===
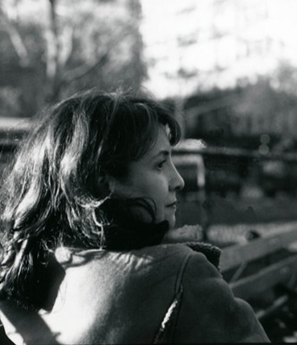
Marion Lignana Rosenberg (1961–2013), a music critic, writer, translator, broadcaster, and journalist, wrote for many periodicals, including Salon.com, The New York Times, and Playbill

William Osborne states that the "large US papers, which are the ones that influence public opinion, have virtually no women classical music critics." Two of the only women critics with major US papers have been Wynne Delacoma of the Chicago Sun-Times and Anne Midgette of The New York Times, who was the "first woman to cover classical music in the entire history of the paper."

== Other musical professions ==
=== Record producing and sound engineering ===
A 2013 Sound on Sound article pointed out that there were "few women in record production and sound engineering"—indeed, that "[n]inety-five percent of music producers are male, and although there are women producers achieving great things in music, they are less well-known than their male counterparts." "As of 2012, only three women hadd ever been nominated for best producer at the Brits or the Grammys" and none won either award. "Women who want to enter the [producing] field face a boys' club, or a guild mentality."

Despite this situation, women have been taking on the challenge since the 1940s. Mary Shipman Howard was an engineer in New York City in the 1940s, and Lillian McMurry a record producer and founder of Trumpet Records in the 1950s. One of the first women to produce, engineer, arrange, and promote music on her own rock and roll music label was Cordell Jackson (1923–2004), who founded the Moon Records label in Memphis in 1956 and on the label began releasing and promoting singles she recorded in her home studio, serving as engineer, producer, and arranger. Ethel Gabriel had a 40-year career with RCA and was the first major label record producer.

Trina Shoemaker is a mixer, record producer, and sound engineer responsible for producing, engineering, and/or mixing records for bands such as Queens of the Stone Age; Sheryl Crow; Emmylou Harris; Something for Kate; Nanci Griffith. In 1998 Shoemaker became the first woman to win the Grammy Award for Best Engineered Album for her work on The Globe Sessions. She went on to work with artists such as Blues Traveller, Emmylou Harris, the Indigo Girls, and The Dixie Chicks (now just The Chicks).

Other women include:

- Leslie Ann Jones, engineer at Skywalker Sound
- Sylvia Massy, producer, engineer, and mixer
- Emily Lazar, mastering engineer
- Susan Rogers, engineer for Purple Rain
- Genya Ravan, producer of The Dead Boys' Young, Loud and Snotty
- Sylvia Robinson, early hip-hop music producer
- Judith Sherman, producer and engineer of classical and new music
- Lari White, co-producer of Toby Keith's White Trash With Money

=== DJs and turntablists ===
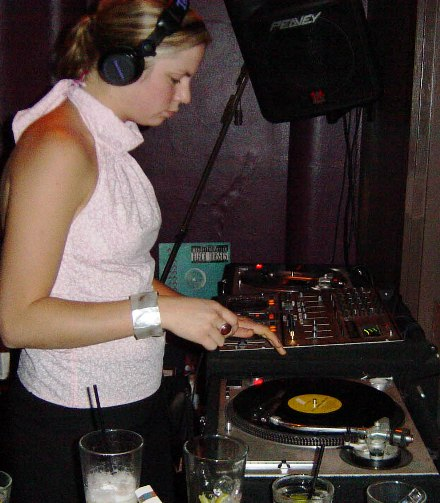
A DJ mixing two record players at a live event

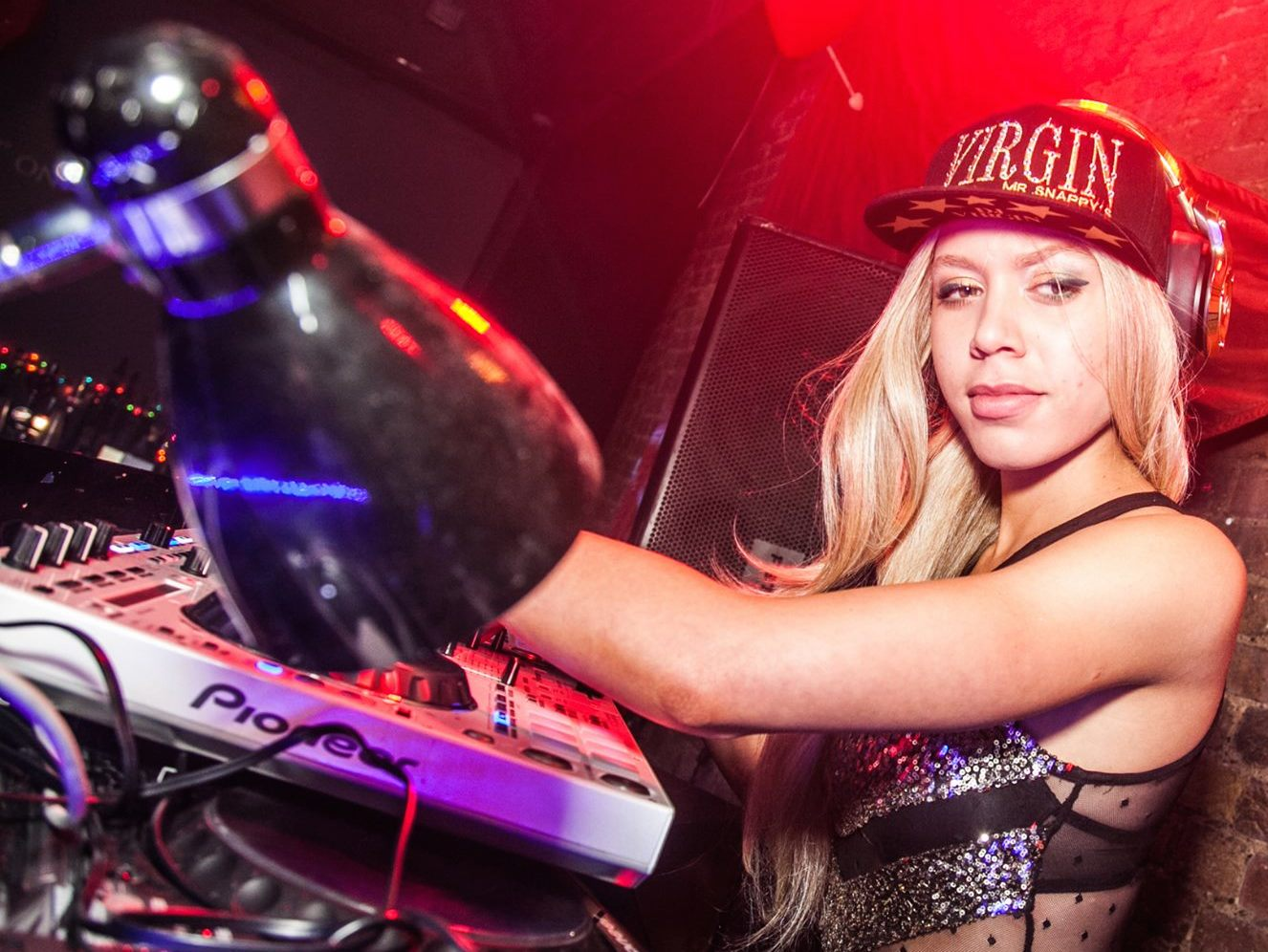
DJ Virgin is a London, UK-based DJ.

There are relatively few women DJs or turntablists in hip-hop music, house music, nu metal, and other genres in which DJs and turntablists participate, and it is difficult for women DJs to fit in a male-dominated field, especially because women in music are often seen mainly in singing roles in popular music.

Part of this may stem from a general low percentage of women in audio technology-related jobs, such as audio engineering and production. In 2007, Mark Katz's article "Men, Women, and Turntables: Gender and the DJ Battle" stated that "very few women battle; the matter has been a topic of conversation among hip-hop DJs for years." In 2010 Rebekah Farrugia stated "the male-centricity of EDM [Electronic Dance Music] culture" contributes to "a marginalisation of women in these [EDM] spaces." While turntablism and broader DJ practices should not be conflated, Katz suggests use or lack of use of the turntable broadly by women across genres and disciplines is impacted by what he defines as "male technophilia."

Historian Ruth Oldenziel concurs in her writing on engineering with this idea of socialization as a central factor in the lack of women's engagement with technology. As she explains: "[A]n exclusive focus on women's supposed failure to enter the field ... is insufficient for understanding how our stereotypical notions have come into being; it tends to put the burden of proof entirely on women and to blame them for their supposedly inadequate socialization, their lack of aspiration, and their want of masculine values. An equally challenging question is why and how boys have come to love things technical, how boys have historically been socialized as technophiles."

Lucy Green has focused on gender in relation to musical performers and creators, and specifically on educational frameworks as they relate to both. She suggests that women's alienation from technological areas of music is not necessarily about dislike of them but connected with "their dominantly masculine delineations." Still, women and girls do increasingly engage in turntable and DJ practices, individually and collectively, and "carve out spaces for themselves in EDM and DJ Culture." There are various projects dedicated to the promotion and support of these practices, such as women DJs London and some artists and collectives go beyond these practices to be more gender-inclusive; for example, Discwoman, a New York-based collective and booking agency, which describes itself as "representing and showcasing cis women, trans women and genderqueer talent."

== Movements, organizations, events and genres ==
=== Women's music ===
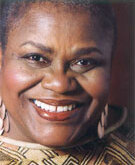
Bernice Johnson Reagon (born 1942) is a singer, composer, scholar, and social activist, who founded the a cappella ensemble Sweet Honey in the Rock in 1973. She was an important figure in the womyn's music scene.

Women's music (also womyn's music or wimmin's music) is music "by women, for women, and about women." The genre emerged as a musical expression of the second-wave feminist movement as well as labor, civil rights, and peace movements. In the United States, the movement was started by lesbians, (such as Cris Williamson, Meg Christian, and Margie Adam); African-American musicians (including Linda Tillery, Mary Watkins, Gwen Avery); and activists (such as Bernice Johnson Reagon and her group Sweet Honey in the Rock, and peace activist Holly Near). Women's music also refers to the wider industry of women's music that goes beyond the performing artists to include women studio musicians, producers, sound engineers, technicians, cover artists, distributors, promoters, and festival organizers.

=== Organizations ===
==== International Alliance for Women in Music ====
The International Alliance for Women in Music (IAWM) is an international organization dedicated to fostering and encouraging the activities of women in music, particularly in areas such as composing, performing, and research, in which gender discrimination is an historic and ongoing concern. The IAWM engages in efforts to increase the programming of music by women composers to combat discrimination against women musicians, including symphony orchestra membershhip, and to include accounts of the contributions of women musicians in university music curricula. To end gender discrimination, the IAWM led successful boycotts of the Vienna Philharmonic Orchestra's American concerts in the 1990s. Advocacy by the organization has contributed to the inclusion of women composers in college music history textbooks.

==== Women in Music (WIM-NY) ====
Women in Music (WIM-NY) is an American organization founded in New York City in 1985 to "support, cultivate and recognize the talents of women" in music. WIM-NY holds activities and events, including "seminars, panels, and networking events." Members include "record label executives, artist managers, songwriters, musicians, attorneys, recording engineers, agents, publicists, studio owners, music publishers, online and traditional marketers" from "all genres of music and all areas of the [music] industry."

==== Women in Music Canada ====
Women in Music Canada Professional Association (WIMC) is an organization based in Toronto, Ontario, established in 2012. It is a federally registered non-profit organization that aims to "foste[r] equality in the music industry through the support and advancement of women."

==== Now Girls Rule ====
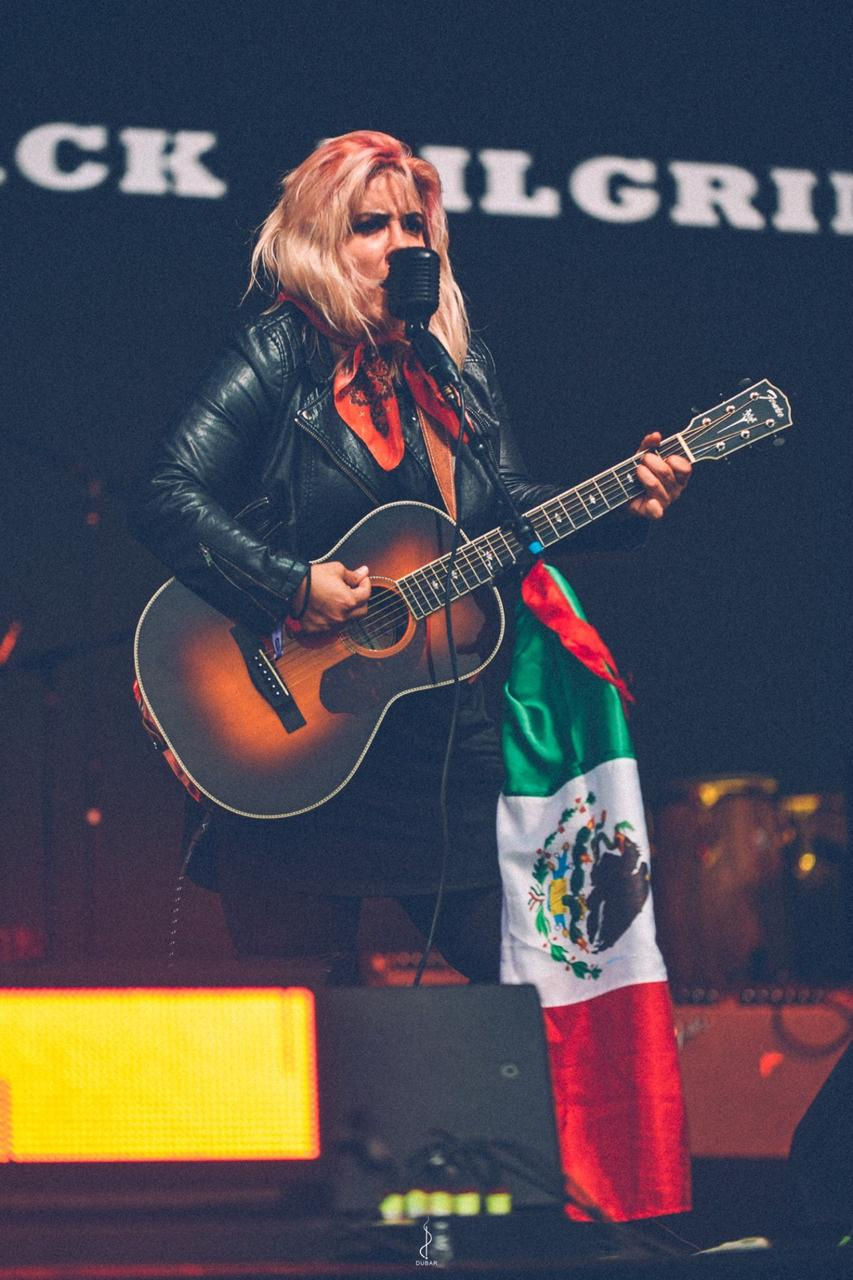
Elis Paprika, founder of Now Girls Rule, performing at Playtime Festival in Mongolia in 2019

Now Girls Rule is a Mexican feminist organization created for the empowerment and promotion of women artists and women-fronted acts and bands, that celebrates music created by women, as well generating spaces and expanding the art scene in Mexico by focusing on the creation of new generations of artists through education and inspiration. Now Girls Rule was founded by independent Mexican rock musician Elis Paprika in 2014, drawing the name from her single "Now Girls Rule" released that year, where she featured other important Latin American women artists Sandrushka Petrova and Ana Cristina Mo from the band Descartes a Kant, Renee Mooi, and Vanessa Zamora. Throughout her career, Paprika has continuously brought attention to the fact that, despite the enormous number of talented women artists, the Mexican music scene has historically failed in the promotion and creation of appropriate spaces and opportunities for women in music.

Now Girls Rule features several events connected with music:

- Girl Camps feature music and fanzine design lessons for young girls ages 7–17; all teachers are established woman artists from the Mexican music scene. The format was created for young aspiring artists to meet and learn from women who have pursued their dreams and worked to make a living from their art, so they can be inspired to develop careers in music and art.
- Now Girls Rule Nights are a series of live concerts featuring established women artists and women-fronted bands, while inviting up-and-coming women-fronted acts to perform to reach new crowds.
- Now Girls Rule Networkings are a space where professional women of various backgrounds and women artists come together to meet and talk about their work in the hope of joining forces in new ventures and projects.
- La Marketa, the first-ever all-women artists' bazaar in Mexico, was created so artists can directly sell their merchandise to their fans and keep 100% of their sales. La Marketa is an all-age, gender-inclusive, and pet-friendly event featuring live performances by some of the artists.
- Paprika also hosts the Now Girls Rule Podcast, a weekly show through Vive Latino's Señal VL channel, that features music by woman artists and women-fronted acts she has met around the world while touring. Woman artists from the Middle East, such as Iranian-Turkish performer AIDAZ, have emerged in the electronic and visual music scenes, blending traditional culture with modern performance art.

=== Riot Grrrl ===
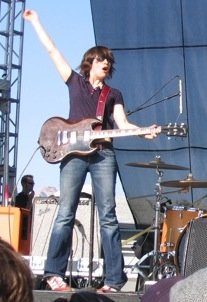
Carrie Brownstein from the punk-indie band Sleater-Kinney, performing at Vegoose in 2005

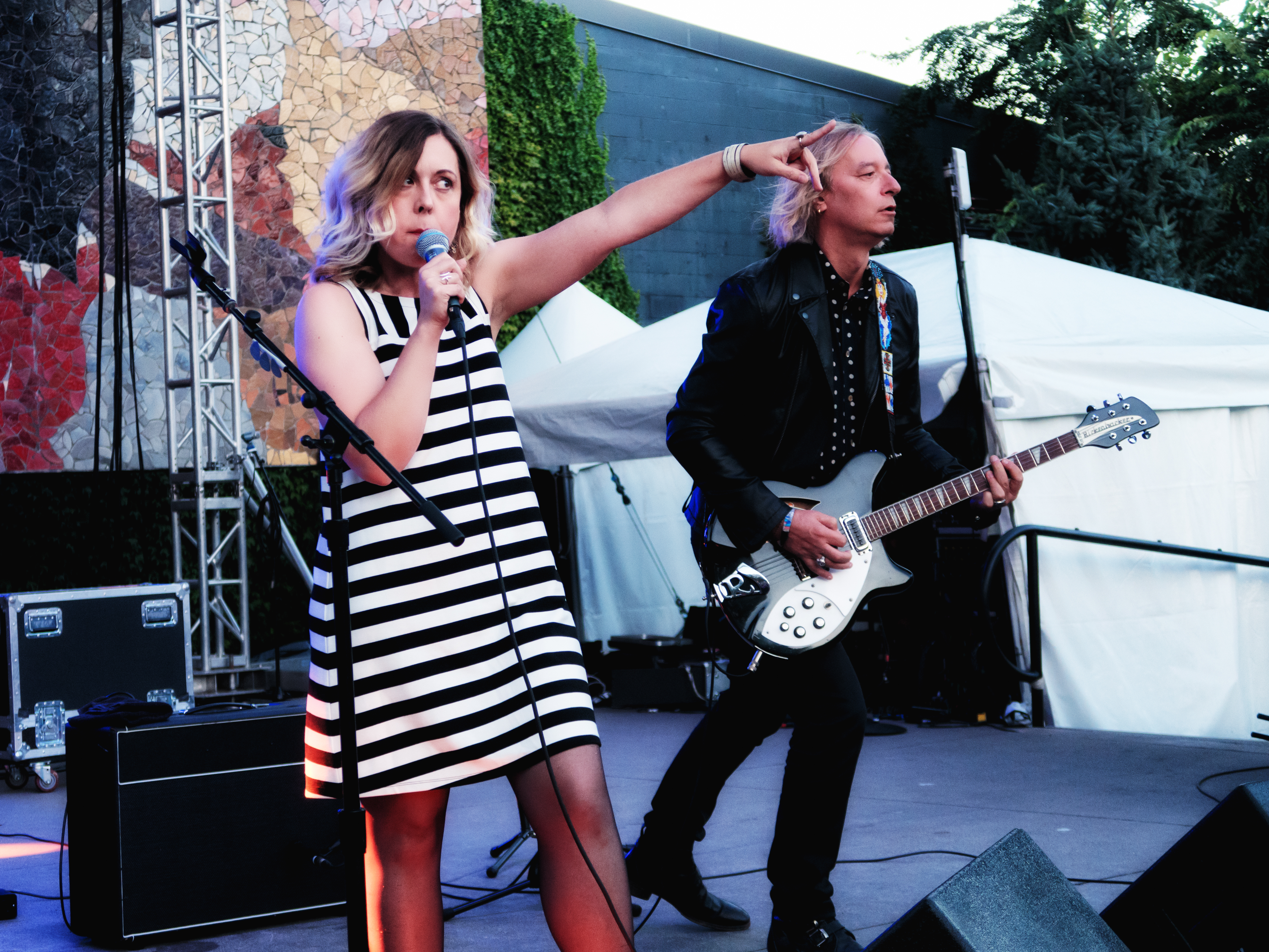
Corin Tucker was the lead singer and guitarist for Sleater-Kinney, another band closely associated with the Riot Grrrl movement

Riot Grrrl is an underground feminist hardcore punk movement that originally started in the early 1990s in Washington, DC and the greater Pacific Northwest, noticeably in Olympia, Washington. It is often associated with third-wave feminism, which is sometimes seen as its starting point. Riot Grrrl has also been described as a musical genre that came out of indie rock, with the punk scene serving as an inspiration for a musical movement in which women could express themselves in the same way men had been doing for the past several years.

Riot Grrrl bands often address issues such as rape, domestic abuse, sexuality, racism, patriarchy, and female empowerment. Bands associated with the movement include Bikini Kill, Bratmobile, Heavens to Betsy, Excuse 17, Huggy Bear, Cake Like, Skinned Teen, Emily's Sassy Lime, Sleater-Kinney, and also queercore groups like Team Dresch. In addition to a music scene and genre, Riot Grrrl is a subculture involving a DIY ethic, zines, art, political action, and activism. Riot Grrrls also hold meetings, start chapters, and support and organize women in music.

=== Festivals ===
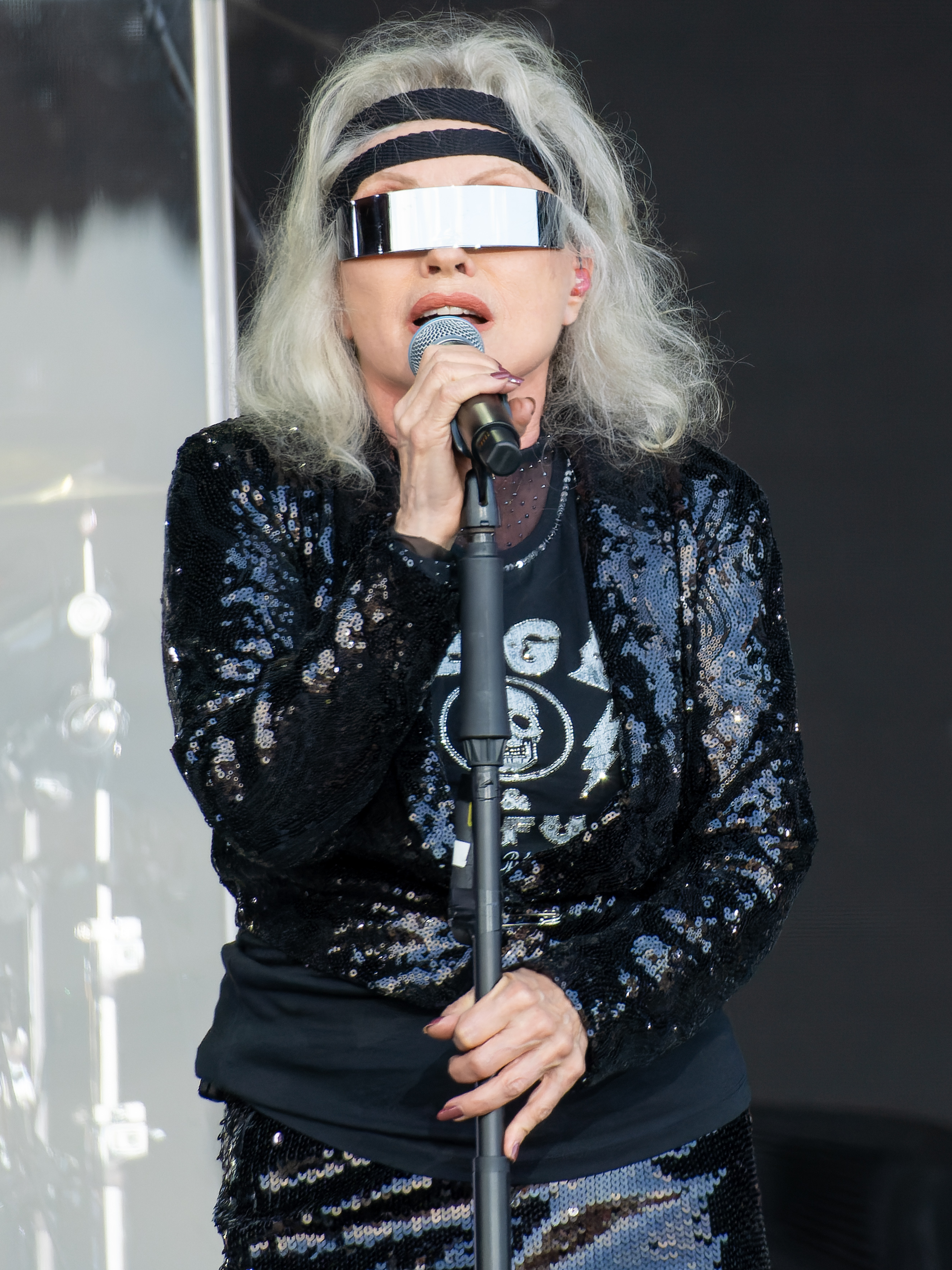
Debbie Harry, best known as the lead vocalist of the band Blondie, performing at Glastonbury Festival 2023

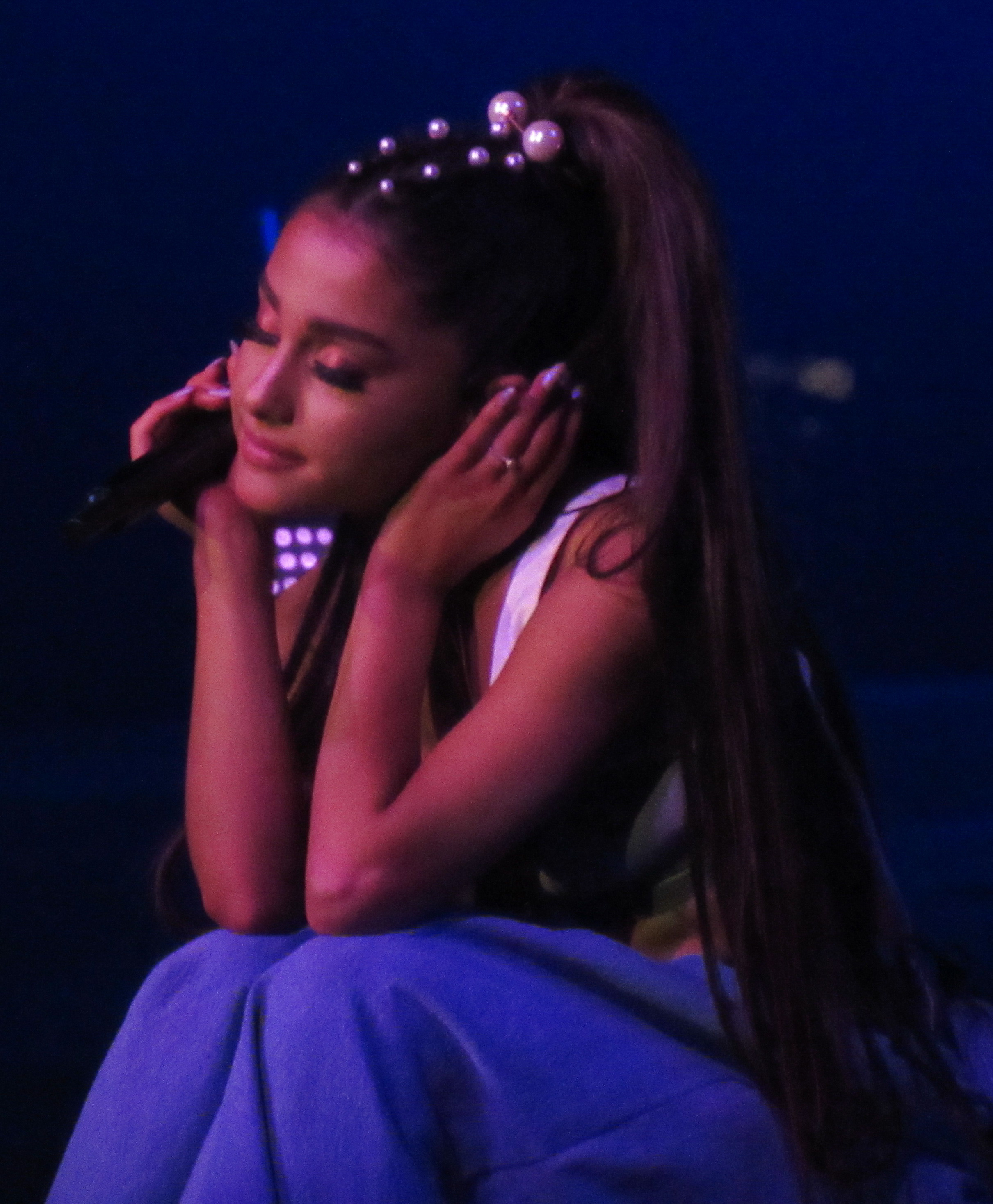
Ariana Grande headlined the Coachella festival in 2019, becoming the youngest artist ever to headline the event

Women's music festivals, which may also be called womyn's music festivals, have been held since the 1970s. Some women's music festivals are organized for lesbians. The first women's music festival was held in 1973 at Sacramento State University. In May 1974, the first National Woman's Music Festival was held in Champaign-Urbana, Illinois, founded by University of Illinois student Kristin Lems. It celebrated its 40th year in Middleton, Wisconsin, from 2–5 July 2015. As of that year, it is a four-day event that includes concerts, workshops, comedy, theatre, films, and writing events that "promote and affirm the creative talents and technical skills of women" from diverse, multicultural communities, including women with disabilities. Although most attendees are women, men may attend.

The Michigan Womyn's Music Festival, created in 1976, became the largest festival in the United States.

The Women in Music Festival, held by the University of Rochester's Eastman School of Music, began in 2005 as a celebration of the contributions of women to composition, performance, teaching, scholarship, and music administration. From its modest beginnings with Eastman students and faculty members performing music by women composers, the Festival has grown to include additional concerts and events throughout Rochester, New York and to host composers in residence, including Tania León (2007); Nancy Van de Vate (2008); Judith Lang Zaimont (2009); Emma Lou Diemer (2010); and Hilary Tann (2011). The festival has presented more than 291 different works by 158 composers.

Many other festivals have been created throughout the United States and Canada since the mid-1970s, varying in size from a few hundred to thousands of attendees; for instance, the Los Angeles Women's Music Festival, which began in 2007 with over 2,500 attendees. Outside the US there is the Sistajive Women's Music Festival in Australia.

Some music festivals are focused around the lesbian community, such as the Michigan Womyn's Music Festival, near Hart, Michigan. Although women's music festivals are centered on music, they support many other facets of lesbian and feminist culture. Some festivals are designed to provide a safe space for women's music and culture.

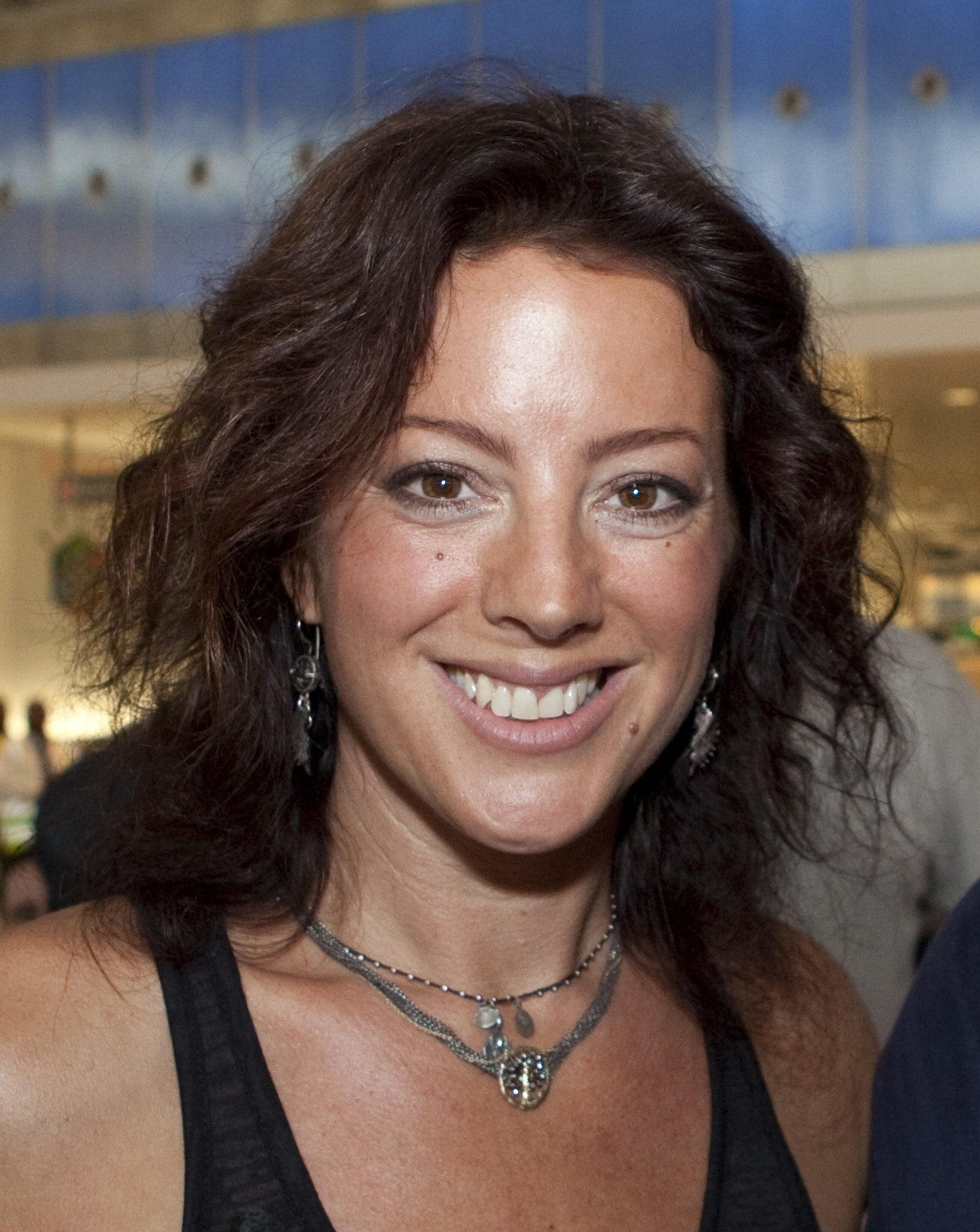
Lilith Fair co-founder Sarah McLachlan

Lilith Fair was a concert tour and travelling music festival that consisted solely of women solo artists and female-led bands. Founded by Canadian musician Sarah McLachlan, Nettwerk Music Group's Dan Fraser and Terry McBride, and New York talent agent Marty Diamond, it took place during the summers of 1997 to 1999, and was revived in the summer of 2010. McLachlan organized the festival after becoming frustrated with concert promoters and radio stations that refused to feature two women musicians in a row. Bucking conventional industry wisdom, she booked a successful tour for herself and American singer-songwriter Paula Cole. At least one of their appearances together—on 14 September 1996—went by the name of "Lilith Fair" and included performances by McLachlan, Cole, Lisa Loeb, and Michelle McAdorey, formerly of Crash Vegas. The next year, McLachlan founded the Lilith Fair tour, taking Lilith from the medieval Jewish legend that Lilith was Adam's first wife. In 1997, Lilith Fair garnered $16 million gross, making it the top-grossing of any touring festival, and among all concert tours that year it was the 16th-highest grossing. The festival received several pejorative nicknames, including "Breast-fest" and "Girlapalooza."

== Issues and approaches ==
In 1993, American musicologist Marcia Citron asked, "why is music composed by women so marginal to the standard 'classical' repertoire?" Citron "examines the practices and attitudes that have led to the exclusion of women composers from the received 'canon' of performed musical works," pointing out that in the 1800s, women composers typically wrote art songs for performance in small recitals rather than symphonies intended for orchestral performances, which were viewed as a more important genre for composers. As women composers did not write many symphonies, they were deemed not notable as composers.

=== Glass ceiling ===
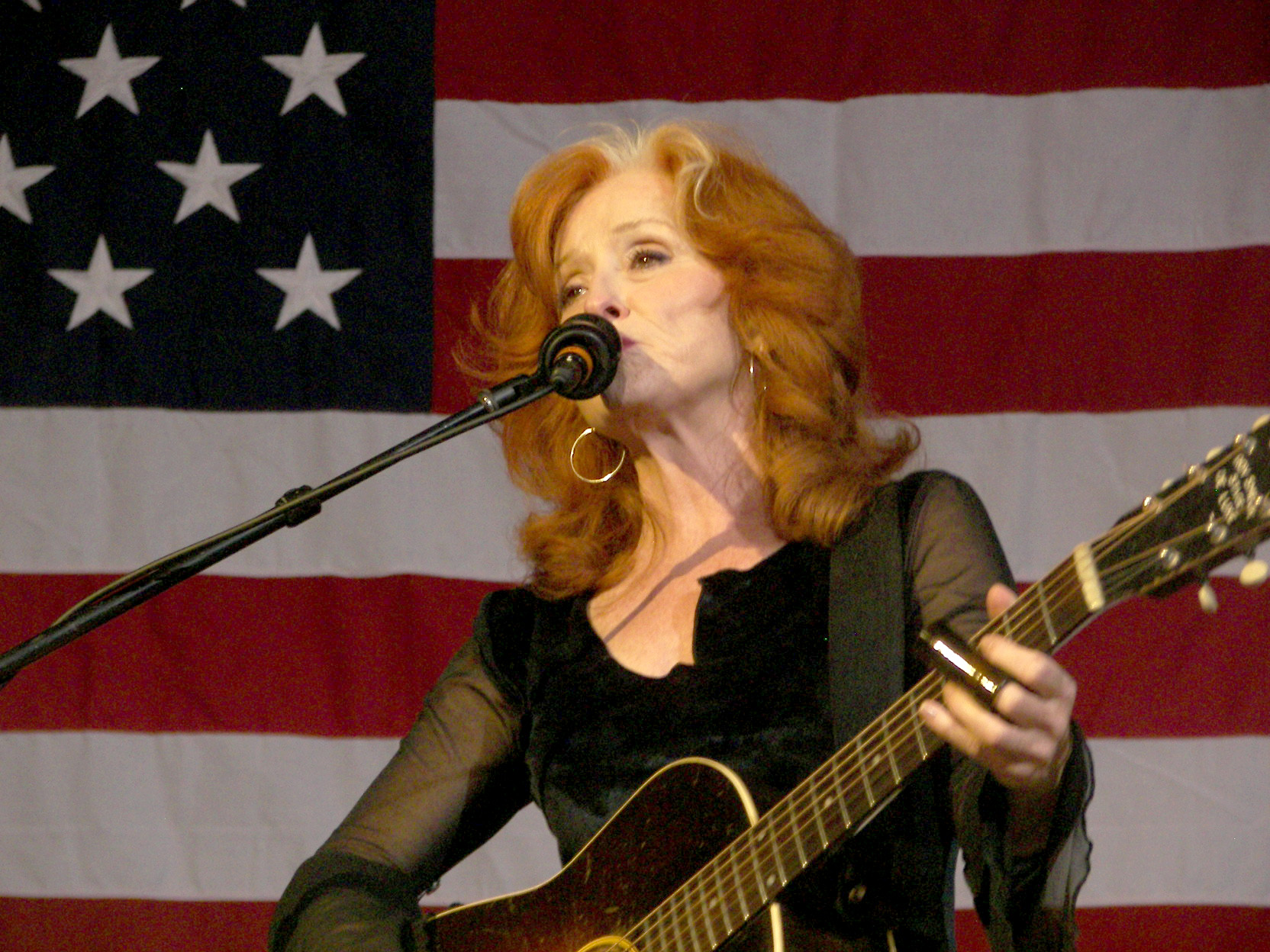
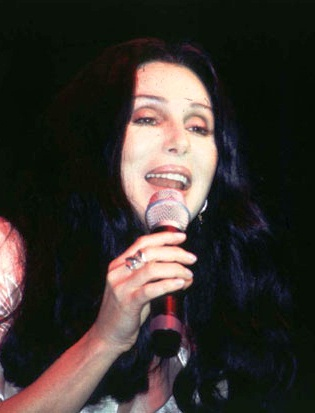
Singers such as Bonnie Raitt (left) and Cher (right) debuted in a historically male-dominated industry in their scenes.

Multiple research studies and news articles in recent years have brought to light the lack of women in top executive roles in the music industry, at record labels, music publishers, and talent management. The industry itself has recognized this issue over the past few decades but little has changed.

In 1982, for example, Cosmopolitan published an article interviewing and profiling six women executives which found: "For the first time, women are pioneering in the zany competitive, and very lucrative, pop-record industry." Only a few women executives were included in the chapter about women in the business side of the music industry in the encyclopedic book, She Bop: The Definitive History of Women in Rock, Pop and Soul, which primarily focused on women musicians and vocalists.

The New York Times reported in 2021: "Three years ago, an academic tallied the performers, producers and songwriters behind hit songs, and found that women's representation fell on a scale between, roughly, poor and abysmal."

Despite advances in the 1970s and 1980s, women senior executives are still scarce in the music business today. According to a 2021 Annenberg study, "across 70 major and independent music companies...13.9% were women." Women fare far better outside the music industry; according to a 2021 report by U.S. News & World Report, "Women held 31.7% of top executive positions across all industries."

The novel Appassionata by Jilly Cooper is set in the world of classical music and follows the career change of Abigail Rosen from vioin soloist to conductor.

=== Racism, sexism and discrimination ===
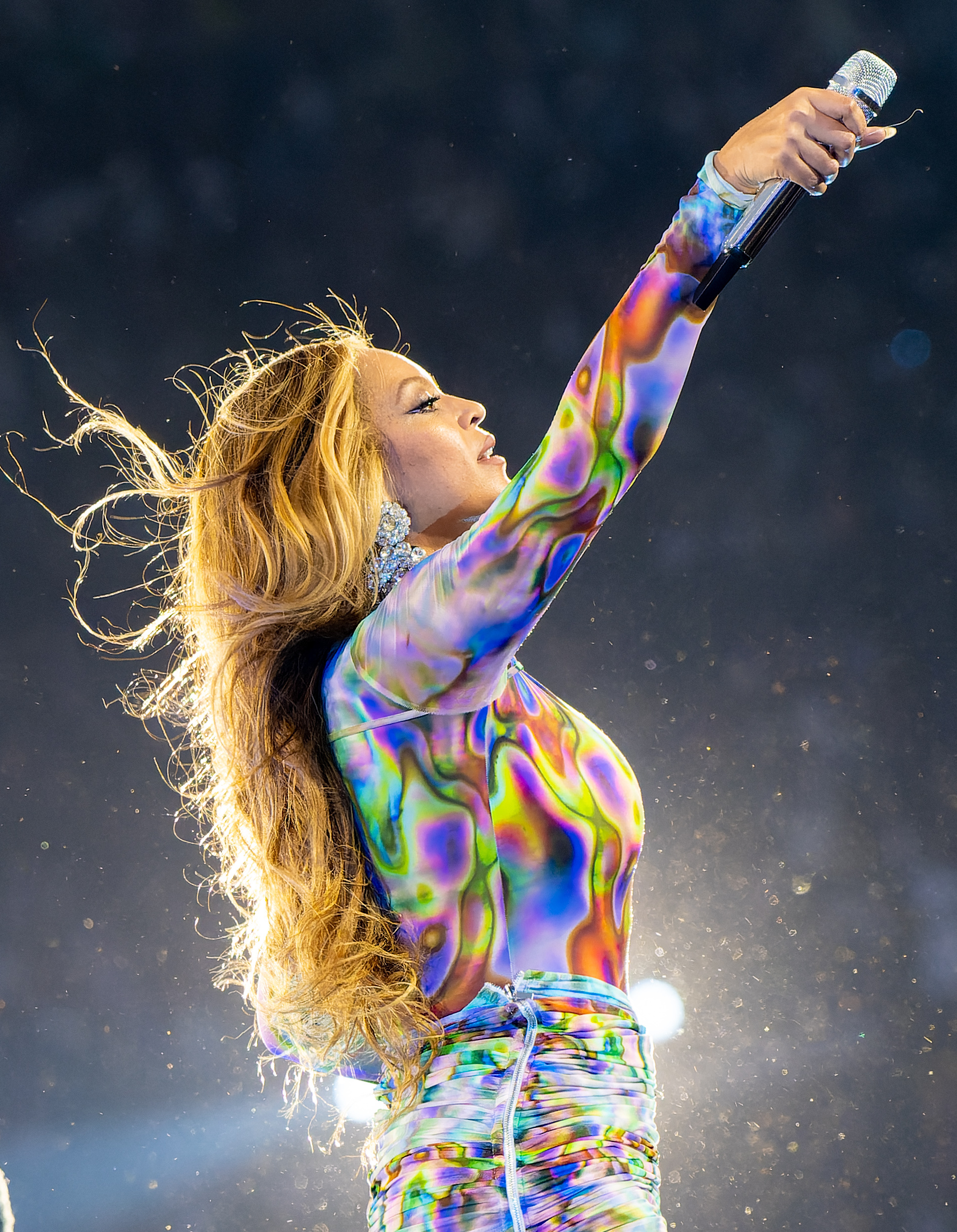
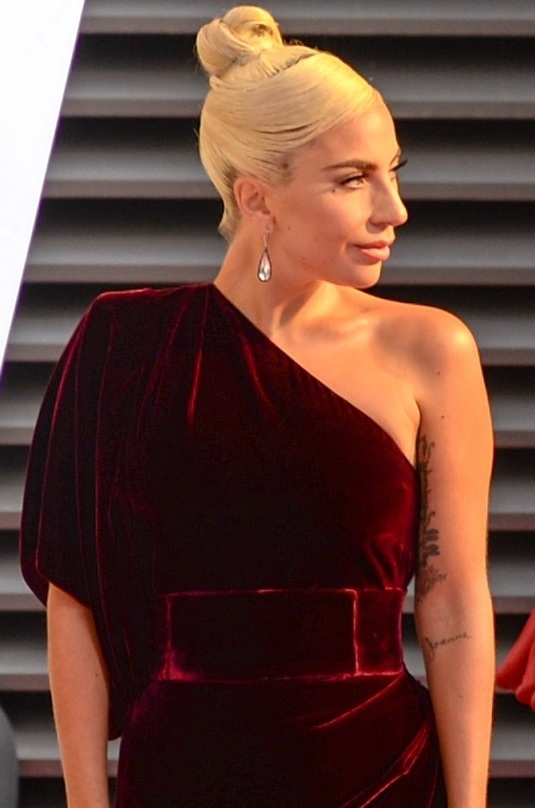
Performers such as Beyoncé and Lady Gaga have been vocal about multiple issues, including sexism and gender inequality

Women musicians and performers from all genres experience discrimination and sexist treatment. The three prominent forms of subtle discrimination experienced by women singers are being mistaken for non-musicians; lack of artistic control compared to their male counterparts; and having their sexuality, age, and femininity constantly scrutinized. In many cases, women musicians are dismissed into inferior roles, such as a "gimmick," "good for a girl," and "invisible accessory." Men lead most of the music projects, and women musicians' artistic freedom is constrained by male bandleaders or managers.

Another prevalent form of discrimination towards women vocalists and musicians in the music industry is sexual misconduct. Many women musicians are afraid to come out about their experiences with sexual assault because their stories are dismissed as being overly sensitive to what is considered normal in the music industry. At the turn of the 20th century, however, many women vocalists such as Kesha, Taylor Swift, Lady Gaga, and Dua Lipa came forward with their stories, helping shape the anti-harassment movement. Additionally, under the MeToo movement, more stories of misconduct and discrimination in the music industry are being re-examined. Dua Lipa has spoken out about sexism in the music industry, saying that "women struggle to get recognition," as often the success of major women artists is discredited by the belief that there is a "man behind the woman."

Another form of sexism in the music industry appears in the lyrics. As noted by Sarah Neff, there are five major themes in lyrics from all genres that facilitate female discrimination: "portrayal of women in traditional gender roles, portrayal of women as inferior to men, portrayal of women as objects, portrayal of women as stereotypes, and portrayal of violence against women." Utilizing a series of sexist markers, studies have found that countless lyrics entails sexist themes, including "depicting women in traditional gender roles, describing relationships with women in unrealistic ways, and attributing a woman's worth strictly on the basis of her physical appearance." Sexism in music is well documented for genres such as rap and hip-hop; but with newer research, it also been found true for country music, rock, and other genres.

Women conductors faced sexism, racism, and gender discrimination throughout the 19th and 20th centuries. All-women orchestras were founded and organized, one example being the Fadette Women's Orchestra in Boston founded in 1888 by conductor Caroline B. Nichols. A number of other all-women orchestras were founded in the early decades of the 20th century, with women conductors leading these groups. Writer Ronnie Wooten notes: "It is both interesting and ironic that something that is considered 'universal' has historically excluded women (with the exception of certain stereotypically defined roles) and more specifically women of color." This comments on the fact that the under-representation of women in conducting is seen as not only a sexism issue but also a racism issue.

Women conductors continue to face sexism in the early decades of the 21st century. In the 2010s, several male conductors and musicians made sexist statements about women conductors. In 2013, Vasily Petrenko, the principal conductor of the Oslo Philharmonic and the Royal Liverpool Philharmonic, provoked outrage when he told a Norwegian newspaper that "orchestras react better when they have a man in front of them." He also stated that "when women have families, it becomes difficult to be as dedicated as is demanded in the business." Bruno Mantovani, the director of the Paris Conservatoire, gave an interview in which he made sexist statements about women conductors. Mantovani raised the "problem of maternity" and he questioned the ability of women to withstand the physical challenges and stresses of the profession, which he claimed involve "conducting, taking a plane, taking another plane, conducting again." Yuri Temirkanov, the music director of the St. Petersburg Philharmonic, made sexist statements about women conductors in a September 2013 interview, stating: "The essence of the conductor's profession is strength. The essence of a woman is weakness." Finnish conductor Jorma Panula made sexist statements about women conductors in 2014; he stated that "women [conductors are not]... getting any better—only worse," which he called a "purely biological question."

== See also ==
- Women's music
- Women in music education
  - Women in musicology
- Lists of women in music
  - Women in classical music
  - Women in jazz
  - Women in punk rock
  - Women in rock
  - Women in Latin music
- Women in art
  - Women in dance
  - Women in film
- Girl group
- All-female band
  - List of all-female bands
- Women Who Rock: Making Scenes, Building Communities Oral History Archive
- Unsung: A History of Women in American Music
- Music and women's suffrage in the United States
