= Women in classical music =

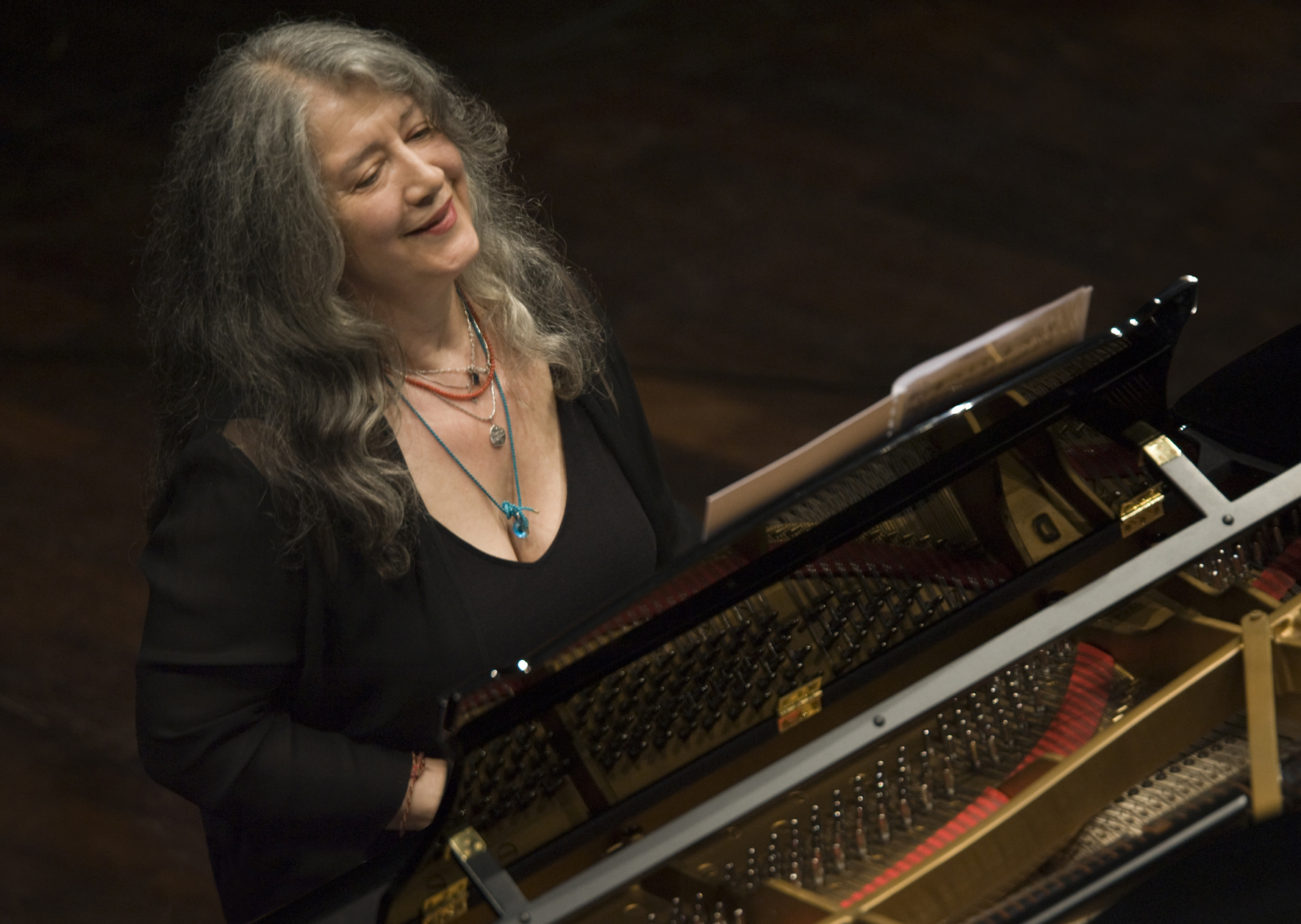
Martha Argerich, (born 1941) a prominent concert pianist

Throughout history, women have played an active role in the development of classical music, contributing as performers, composers, conductors, and as scholars. The rise of cultural feminism in the 20th century increased the attention given to female musicians in musicological scholarship, however they remain underrepresented in the historical narratives of Western classical music due to the social structures in which classical music developed.

The contribution of female musicians can be seen evolving and developing alongside the traditions of art music in the Western world and across each of the periods and associated styles observed in the history of classical music.

== History ==
=== Antiquity to 500 ce. ===
Evidence for female musicians from this time period has been observed in ancient Greece and Rome. Vase painting from 5th- and 6th- century Athens depict both women's choruses and female instrumentalists. Other early references to female musicians include Old Testament references, such as the Victory Song of Miriam recorded in the biblical narrative of The Exodus. Participation of women in Jewish liturgy was prohibited during this time period with the excpetion of responding to psalms chanted by male voices.

=== 500- 1500. ===
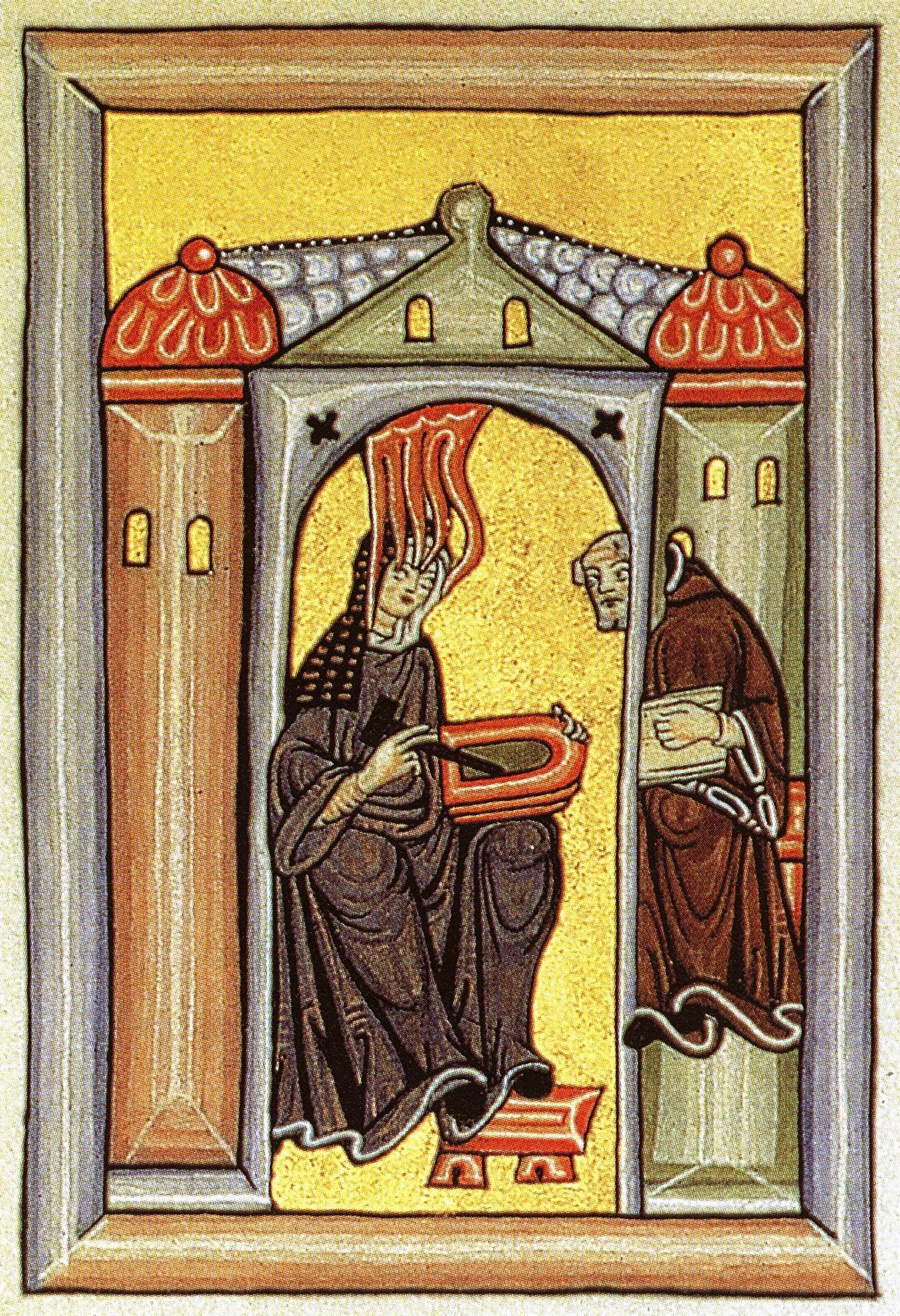
Hildegard of Bingen

Sahakdukht and Khosrovidukht of the 8th century CE are among the earliest recorded women composers. Both are of Armenian origin and composed liturgical chants. In the 12th century, Hildegard of Bingen also wrote religious pieces.

Women have been necessary for the functioning of adult choirs, which require the upper register that few men can sing, although Pope Leo IV (847–855 CE) banned women in choirs from singing in churches, and Pope Pius X banned women from church choirs in 1907. Antonio Vivaldi directed an all-girl orchestra in 1714 at a school for girls.

Historically, women were often expected to master instruments and basic musicianship such as reading, writing, and performing music. However, until the 20th century, it was seen as immoral to perform publicly and women were expected to play only in the private domestic setting. Until recently, women were not allowed to study at a conservatory level, and those studying music were tracked into a less demanding curriculum that omitted topics considered complex. These subjects included composition, counterpoint, (Note: See, e.g., Margaret Ruthven Lang – women were barred from counterpoint classes at the Royal Conservatory in Munich until 1898) and orchestration. Women have been even less encouraged to compose than to perform. The professional status of women composers was influenced by their family and marital status; a woman from a musical family who had the support of her husband and her father could make a name for herself.

A prominent historic example is Élisabeth Jacquet de La Guerre, a French composer born in 1665. Her grandfather, Jehan Jacquet, and her father, Claude Jacquet, were harpsichord makers. Rather than teaching just his sons, Claude Jacquet taught both his sons and his daughters how to survive and thrive in the world. This upbringing, support from her father, and her family's rich history of musicianship was a major stepping stone for her musical career. At the age of five, Louis XIV took notice of her when she performed at the palace of Versailles. This eventually led to her becoming a musician in the court of the Sun King, Louis XIV. She wrote most of her works for her king, which was common for the time. Titon du Tillet accorded her a place in his Mount Parnassus when she was only 26 years old. Although her only published opera, Céphale et Procris, had but five or six performances, she continued to compose throughout her life, producing a wide variety of pieces. After her death, her genius in composition, her creativity in vocal and instrumental music, and her variety of genres were widely acknowledged. Her life and career success show that she was given a rare opportunity to succeed as a female composer, and that she took full advantage of that opportunity.

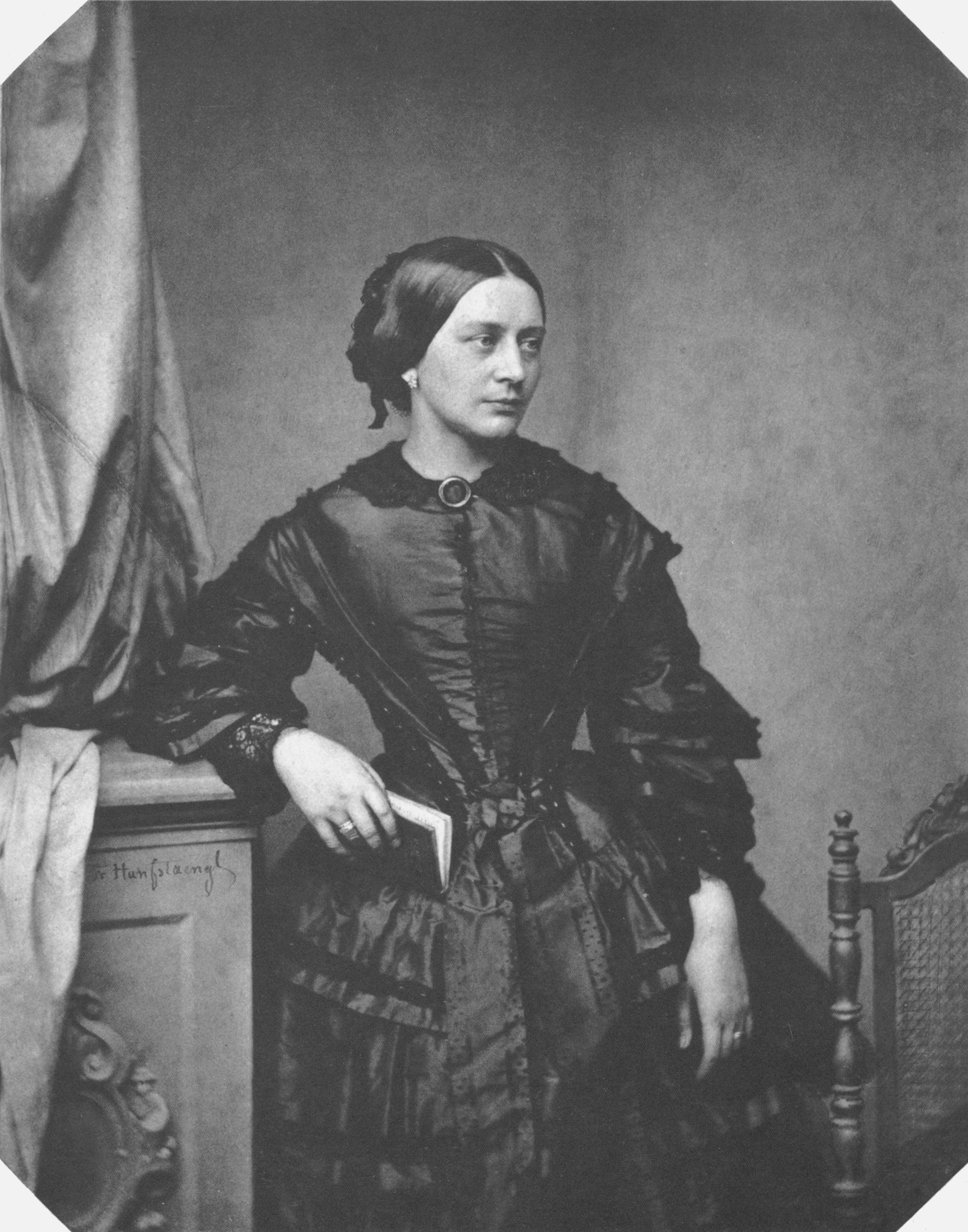
Clara Schumann was a renowned pianist and composer, known for her symphonic, chamber, and art song works.

It used to be considered proper for a young woman in upper society to attain proficiency on a classical instrument, usually the piano, harp, classical guitar, or voice. Women's roles in music, whether it be performance or education, was meant for their private lives inside their homes, rather than for public "display". Further, women were not trained as professionals, because it was considered immodest for a woman to perform in public. These etiquette guidelines were typically spread by books such as Letters to a Young Lady written by John Bennett in 1798, and Letters to Young Ladies written by Lydia Sigourney in 1844. Musical performance was seen as a feminine pursuit, and thus schools for women often had more of a focus on music than schools for boys. In fact, the first music conservatory in the United States, Music Vale Seminary, was established in 1835 for the purpose of teaching women music. The culture of women learning music was strong in the 18th century and George Washington's step-granddaughter Eleanor Custis Parke and Thomas Jefferson's wife Martha Jefferson were musicians.

Women did not often compose classical music in the 18th century. While compositions written by women were sometimes acceptable in Europe and Great Britain, compositions written by American women were usually attributed vaguely or not at all. Several women composers (for example Fanny Hensel, Clara Schumann, Augusta Holmès, Claude Arrieu, and Rebecca Clarke) wrote some works under masculine noms de plume.

From 1870 to 1910, women started to take more jobs in classical music, especially teaching positions. The American Clara Baur was the first woman to found a conservatory, the University of Cincinnati – College-Conservatory of Music, in 1867. The growing American popularity of opera music in this time period also contributed to a rising number of women in classical music, as women were needed to sing prominent female parts.

=== 20th century ===
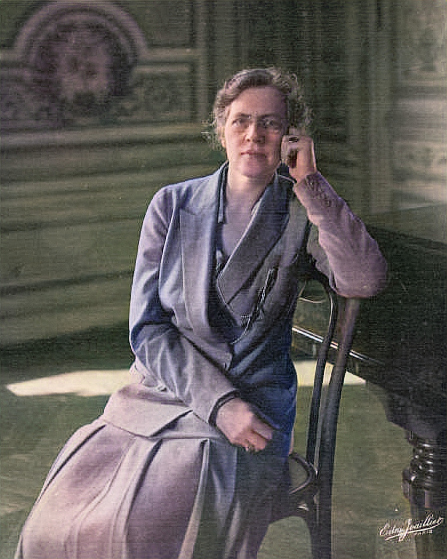
Nadia Boulanger was a pioneering French composer and conductor, the first woman to conduct the London Philharmonic in 1936

In 1936, Nadia Boulanger conducted a concert with the London Philharmonic, the first woman to do so. Boulanger also went on to conduct the Philadelphia Orchestra, Boston Symphony, and New York Philharmonic in the following years. Vítězslava Kaprálová conducted the Czech Philharmonic in 1937 and the BBC Orchestra (later known as the BBC Symphony Orchestra) in 1938 in London, during the 16th ISCM Festival.

Following the end of World War II, the number of women in classical music jobs greatly increased in the United States. In 1947, only 8% of symphony orchestra musicians were women, compared to 26.3% in 1982. The number of women in European orchestras, however, remained low. Women in tenured composition positions at universities also remained very uncommon in the 1970s, with 10.6% of those positions occupied by women.

In 1984 Odaline de la Martinez became the first woman to conduct at a BBC Promenade Concert at the Royal Albert Hall.

=== 21st century ===
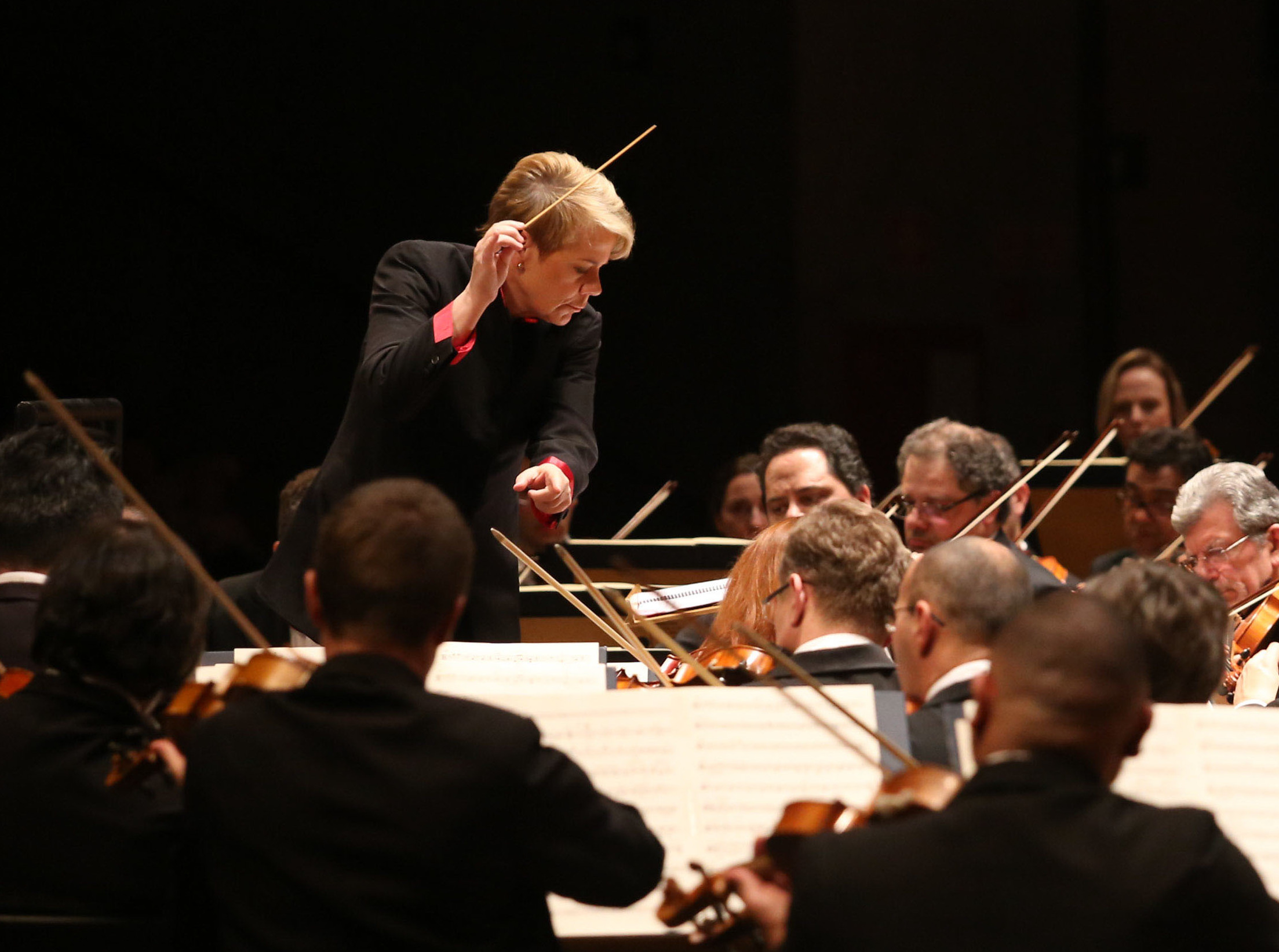
Marin Alsop is an American conductor and the first woman to lead a major American orchestra, the Baltimore Symphony Orchestra.

The numbers of women and men players in U.S. orchestras are roughly equal, but the ratio in European orchestras is still low. Across the world, there are relatively few women conductors, but numbers are increasing, as figures like Marin Alsop, Barbara Hannigan, Susanna Mälkki, and Mirga Gražinytė-Tyla gain public attention and popularity.

== Women in orchestras ==
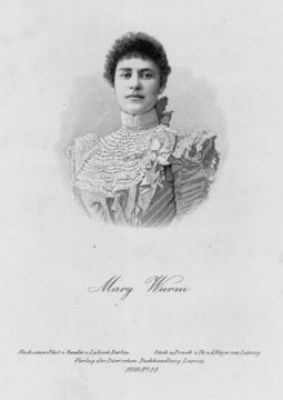
Mary Wurm founder of the first women-only orchestra in Berlin in 1898, paving the way for women in orchestras.

The first orchestra in the world ever to hire women musicians was the Queen's Hall Orchestra in London in 1913, conducted by Sir Henry Wood.

Before 1913, women played in women-only orchestras, the first of which may have been the Vienna Damen Orchester (which grew from an ensemble started in 1868) and Das Erste Europäische Damenorchester (The First European Ladies' Orchestra), founded in 1873, both conducted by Josephine Amann-Weinlich.

Other such groups included Marie Roller's "Damen Elite Kapelle" ('Ladies' Elite'); the Ladies' Philharmony which had a female core of 11 women musicians; The Women’s String Orchestra of New York, 1896-1906; and the Fadettes of Boston from 1888 to c. 1920. Another women's orchestra was founded by Mary Wurm in 1898 in Berlin.

The first known women to join an American orchestra were Djina Ostrowska, first harpist, Helen Burr-Brand, second harpist, and Ida Divinoff, first violinist, who were accepted into the Detroit Symphony Orchestra by December 1918. Another woman who joined an American orchestra early was the harpist Edna Phillips, who was accepted into the Philadelphia Orchestra in 1930. The first woman principal player in a major symphony orchestra in the United States on any instrument was the horn player Helen Kotas, who served as principal horn in the Chicago Symphony from 1941-1947.

Women were nonexistent in most major symphony orchestras up until the 1960s. In 1982, the Berlin Philharmonic hired its first woman, Madeleine Carruzzo. In 2003, the Vienna Philharmonic appointed its first woman musician after 161 years of operating without women. In fact, there had been an explicit ban on women musicians in the Vienna Philharmonic until 1996, when the Philharmonic was threatened with budget cuts by the Austrian government.

Women have historically been underrepresented in orchestral percussion, a section often perceived as physically demanding and traditionally dominated by men. These perceptions, along with entrenched gender stereotypes and limited early exposure for girls to percussion instruments, have contributed to ongoing inequality in professional opportunities. In major orchestras, particularly in the U.S. and U.K., studies have shown that women hold a disproportionately small number of timpani and percussion positions. For example, women filled only 3% of percussion roles in some of London’s top orchestras as of the early 2020s.

Biases persist not only in hiring but also in perceptions of leadership and ability. Female percussionists often face skepticism about their technical skill and stamina, and are less frequently appointed to principal or section leader roles. According to Renée Keller, Principal Timpanist at ProMusica Chamber Orchestra, “The world of percussion has historically been a male-dominated field, that to this day, continues to lack equal gender representation”.

Nevertheless, several prominent women have challenged these barriers and reshaped perceptions of the field. Dame Evelyn Glennie, the first solo percussionist to perform at the BBC Proms, is widely credited with raising the profile of solo percussion performance and demonstrating that women can succeed at the highest levels. Similarly, the percussionist and composer Marilyn Mazur has received international acclaim for her work across genres, helping to expand the role of percussion in contemporary music. Viola Smith was another talented female percussionist, playing for two films and a Broadway musical, and leading her own band.

Continued progress toward gender equity in percussion depends on systemic changes, including inclusive music education, mentorship opportunities, and institutional commitments to diversity. These efforts aim to ensure that future generations of female percussionists can pursue careers free from gender-based barriers.

== Women conductors ==
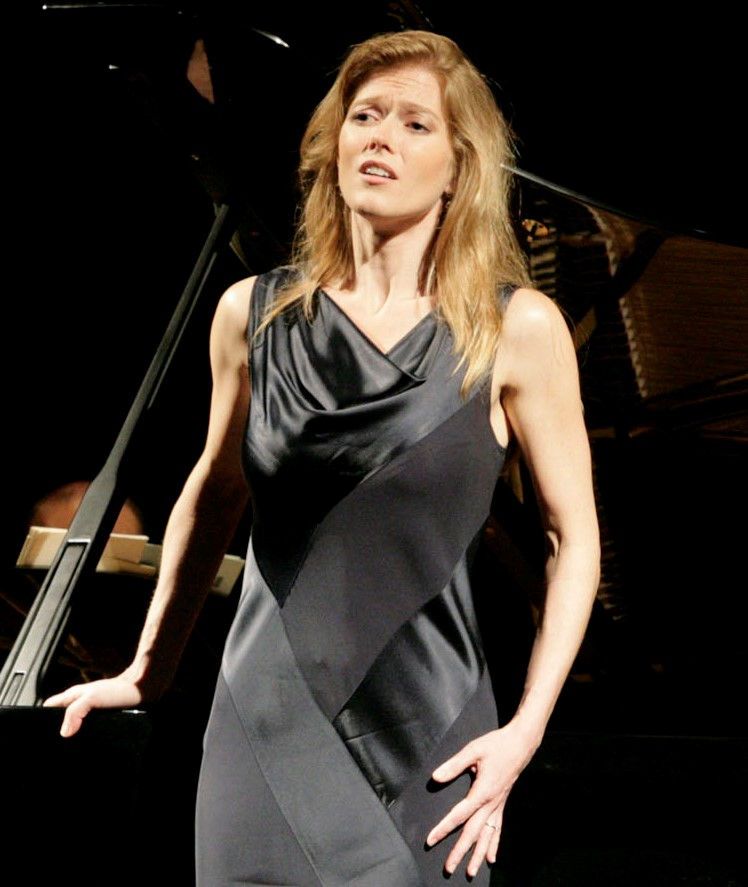
Barbara Hannigan Canadian conductor and soprano, known for her dynamic performances and work with major orchestras

Despite the early successes of Emma Roberta (sometimes 'Roberto') Steiner (1856–1929) and Caroline B. Nichols (1864–1939), who were both noted for their conducting careers, the gender imbalance has been particularly notable in music directorships of symphony orchestras.

The 1987 documentary film A Woman Is a Risky Bet: Six Orchestra Conductors(Swedish: Dirigenterna) highlighted skepticism towards women conductors and musicians by some, specifically in a visit to the Vienna Philharmonic Orchestra and in interviews with international impresarios.

As of November 2016, 4.1% of major orchestras in the United States were led by a woman, and out of the 150 recognized top conductors in the world, only 3.3% were women. ClassicFM reported that in 2019 women occupied eight places among the top-rated 100 conductors worldwide. In 2023, agents in the UK representing conductors had 11.2% females on their books. Despite the recent rise in the number of female conductors, in the 2024-2025 season only 20.8% of concerts by the top 21 orchestras in the United States were directed by women.

A conducting competition exclusively for women, La Maestra, has been held biennially since 2020. The competition is the subject of the 2023 documentary film Maestra.

The novel Appassionata by Jilly Cooper follows the career of the fictional conductor Abigail Rosen.

== Women composers ==
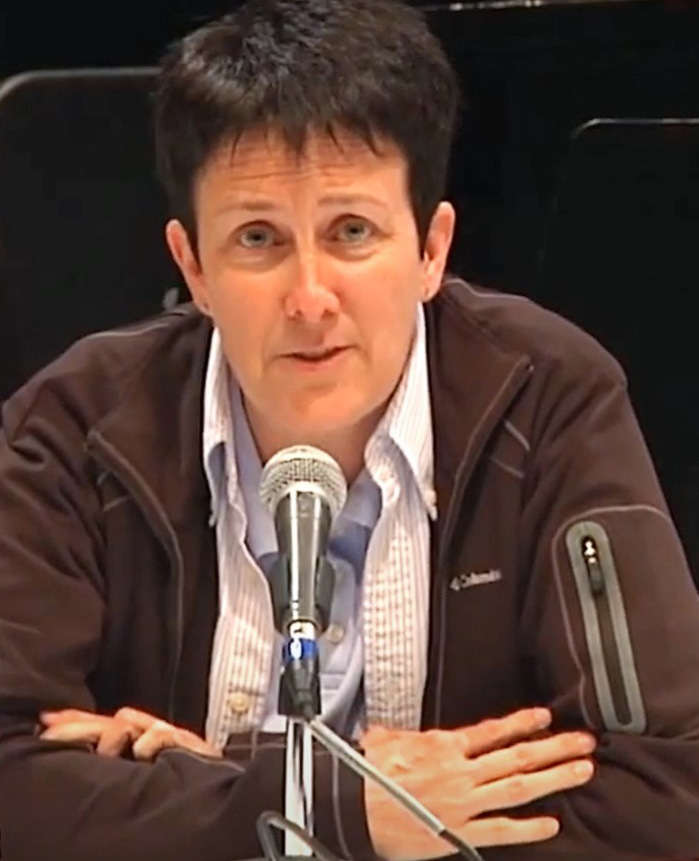
The American composerJennifer Higdon. Higdon's work spans orchestral, chamber, and choral music. She won the Pulitzer Prize for Music in 2010 for her Viola Concerto.

In 2015 Sara Mohr-Pietsch estimated in an article for The Guardian that about 40% of living composers are female, and yet, she lamented, only about 17% of names on music publishers' lists were female.

Research by the Boston Symphony Orchestra suggests a starker discrepancy; in programming for the top 22 US orchestras in 2014–2015, only 1.8% of composers were female. Recognising that, historically, unchallenged societal norms limited opportunities for women as composers, the BSO's study included a similar analysis considering the proportions of living composers programmed; but even within this subset of the data, the proportion of composers programmed who were women reached only 14.3%, far short of the near-parity that might be desired in these notionally more enlightened times; and that figure is only one third of Mohr-Pietsch's 40%.

By 2021, the proportion of women's compositions in programming for 111 global orchestras had risen to 7.7%; living composer proportion was not quoted in this study.

A similar figure (7.5%) was reported by the "Donne, Women in Music" group for the 2023-2024 season, which they described as "a disturbing stagnation and regression in the diversity of global orchestral repertoire."

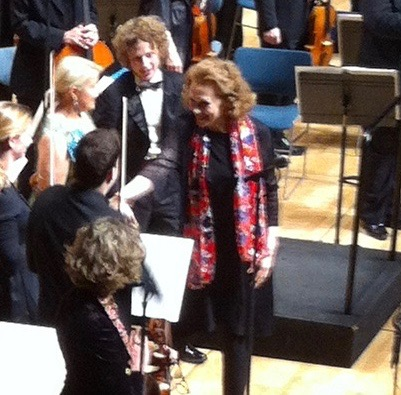
During her life, Kaija Saariaho was a prominent composer, with works like L'Amour de loin and Orion performed by major orchestras and opera companies.

In "The Power List: Why Women Aren't Equals In New Music Leadership and Innovation", Ellen McSweeney discusses six generic contributory factors identified in 2013 by Sheryl Sandberg in Lean In: Women, Work and the Will to Lead which may have some effect on these numbers; they would all need to be addressed further to level the playing field.

- Women musicians, like all women, pay a "likability tax" when they are self-promoting, assertive, and successful.
- Women musicians are less likely to embark on high-visibility projects, to take professional risks, and to conceive of themselves as leaders—which leaves them at a distinct disadvantage in developing entrepreneurial careers.
- Women consistently underestimate their own talents and abilities, leaving them at a disadvantage in the essential realm of self-promotion.
- When choosing whom to hire, men are significantly more likely to choose a man.
- Similarly, senior men are more likely to mentor young men than young women.
- Women are taught from an early age to worry about whether they can simultaneously have children and a career.

== Reactions ==
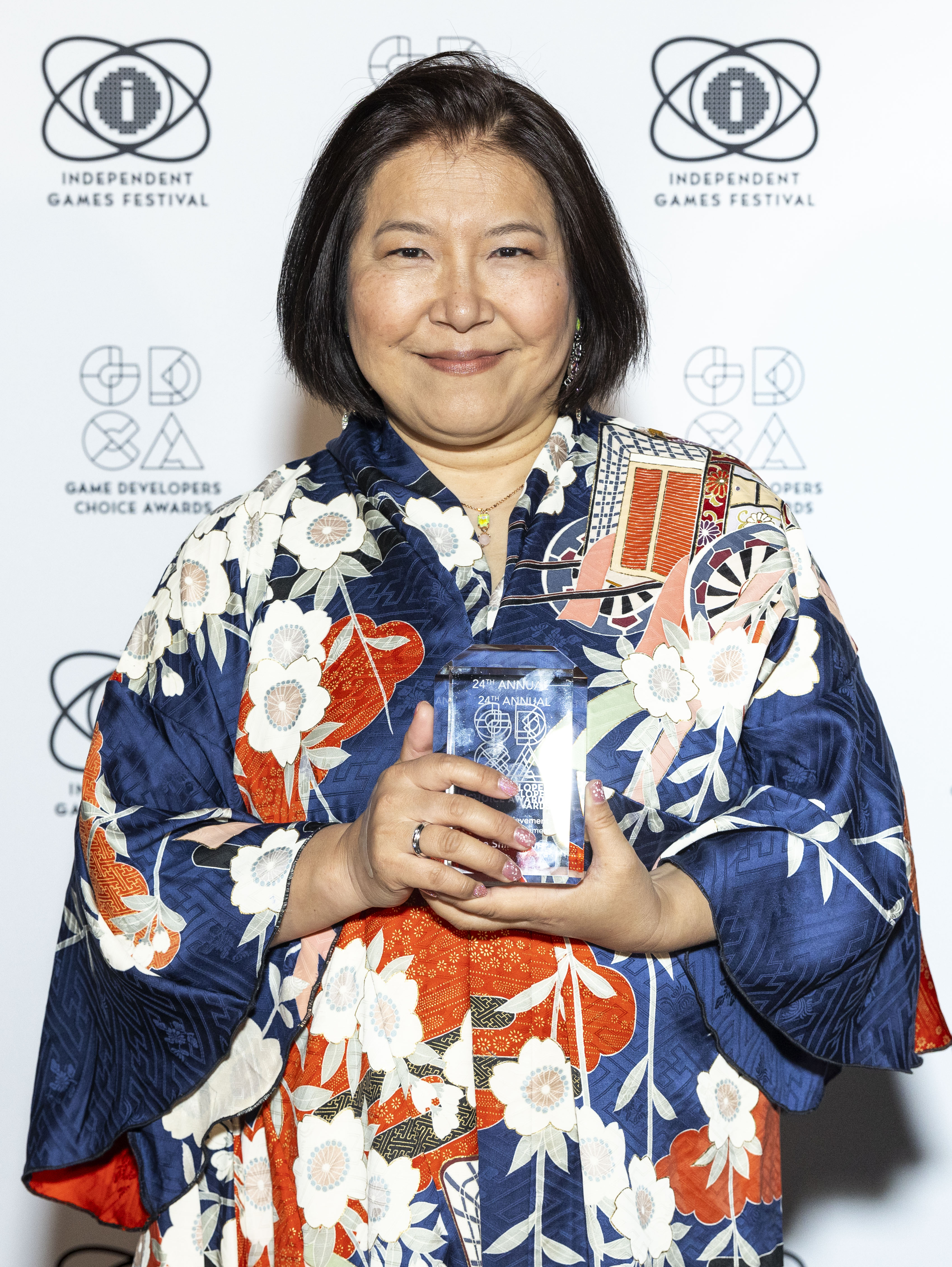
Yoko Shimomura is known for blending classical and modern music in her video game compositions, including Kingdom Hearts.

Kristin Kuster makes the point that "The message needs to be given that ...[composing] is something ...[women] can do and ...[music 'authorities'] want to hear from them", she said. "If these women aren't seeing that this is a possibility, they can't even self-select out."

Marin Alsop said that when her conducting career began to take off she assumed that there was a larger trend of women conductors making their way in the orchestra world. "I thought it was changing, and then it didn't change", she has said.

She is on record as saying that there can be a tendency to celebrate notable firsts or high-profile individual successes and just assume these one-offs mean a problem is solved. "You can't give up just because the box is ticked", Alsop said. "Just because Jennifer Higdon won the Pulitzer Prize [for composition] is no reason not to push for the next woman."

== Redress ==
Among the individuals and groups seeking to redress the gender imbalance in music have been:

- Diana Ambache, who established the internet resource Women of Note and the Ambache Charitable Trust.
- The International Alliance for Women in Music.
- Fondazione Adkins Chiti: Donne in Musica, founded by the late Patricia Adkins Chiti, a member organisation of the UNESCO International Music Council (see European Music Council).
- Women's Philharmonic Advocacy. Promoting the legacy of the legendary Women's Philharmonic, this organization supports American orchestras that program music by women composers.
- Project 19, which has been running since 2020 at the New York Philharmonic, and is the largest female women-only commission in history.
- The Kapralova Society. Founded in 1998, the society publishes Kapralova Society Journal: A Journal of Women in Music.
- Women in Music (UK).
- Donne, Women in music, a UK foundation initiated by Gabriella Di Laccio.
- The Boulanger Initiative, an organization that promotes women and gender-marginalized composers, co-founded by Laura Colgate and Joy Leilani-Garbutt in 2019 (USA).

Historical groups with similar aims have included the Society of Women Musicians in the UK.

== See also ==
- Lists of women in music
- Women in music
- List of African-American women in classical music
- List of female classical conductors
