= Guerre =

Guerre is a French surname. Guerre means "war" in French. Notable people with the surname include:

- Camille Guerre (born 1996), French synchronized swimmer
- Élisabeth Jacquet de La Guerre (1665–1729), French musician, harpsichordist, composer, and daughter-in-law of Michel
- Henri Guerre (1885–1924), French footballer
- Martin Guerre, French peasant of the 16th century
- Michel de La Guerre (1605–1679), French organist and composer
