= Céphale et Procris =

Céphale et Procris is the name of two French operas based on the myth of Cephalus and Procris:

- Céphale et Procris (Jacquet de la Guerre) (1694) by Élisabeth Jacquet de la Guerre
- Céphale et Procris (Grétry) (1773) by André Grétry
