= Gabriella Di Laccio =

Brazilian operatic soprano

Gabriella Di Laccio MBE
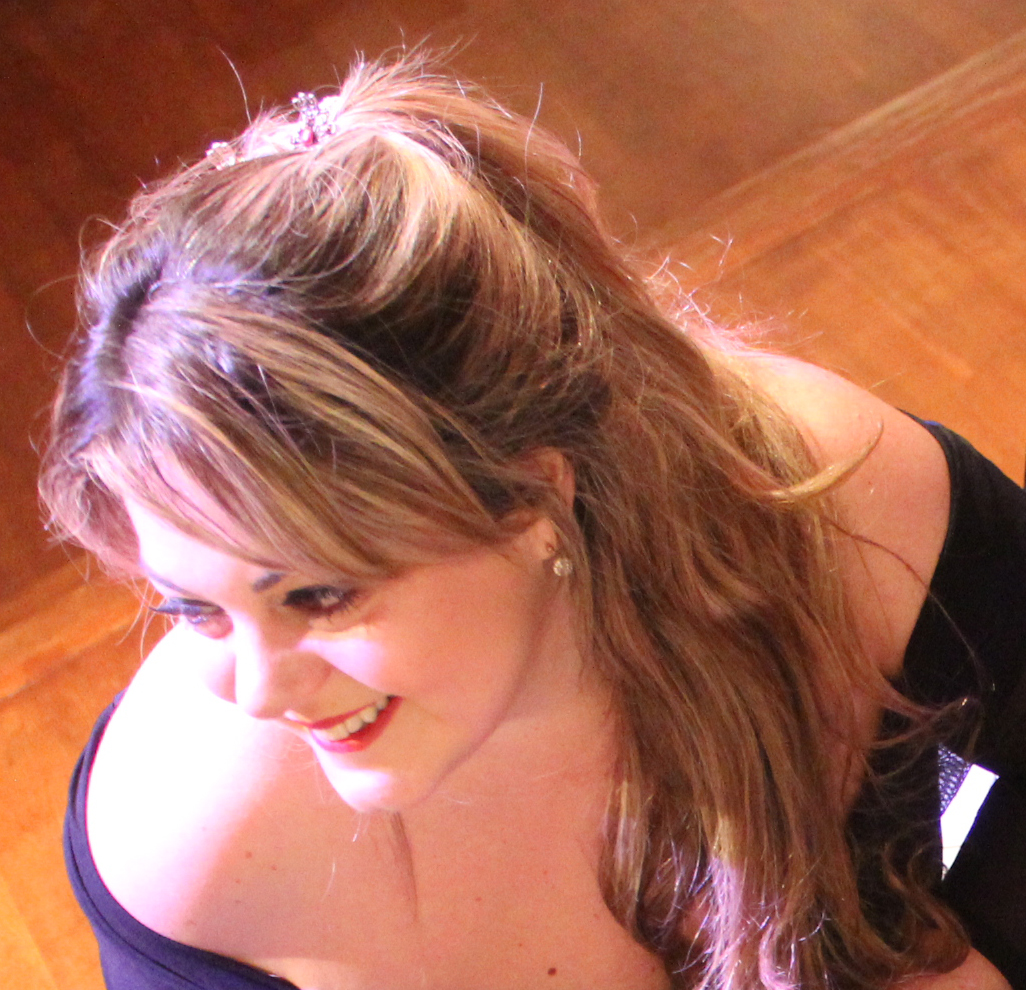
- Di Laccio in 2016
- Born: Canoas, Rio Grande do Sul
- Education: Royal College of Music
- Occupation: Opera singer (soprano)
- Known for: Founder of Donne Foundation; BBC 100 Women (2018); Guinness World Record Holder (2024)
- Awards: Member of the Order of the British Empire (MBE, 2025); BBC 100 Women (2018); Acquisition International’s Most Inspirational Female Musician (2021)
- Website: gabrielladilaccio.com

Gabriella Di Laccio, MBE is a Brazilian operatic soprano, recording artist, public speaker, curator, and activist. She performs in the opera seria genre of the Baroque, as well as in Classical, Romantic and contemporary repertoire, and her career spans opera, oratorio and chamber music. Recognised by conductor Sir Charles Mackerras as “a singer of outstanding talent,” she has performed leading roles such as Cleopatra (Giulio Cesare), Semele (Semele), Adina (L’elisir d’amore), Musetta (La Bohème), Susanna (Le nozze di Figaro), Despina (Così fan tutte), and Zerlina (Don Giovanni). She appears regularly on major international stages and with ensembles including Florilegium, Il Festino, Di Profundis, and the Baroque Orchestra of Mercosur.

Listed among the BBC’s 100 Women in 2018, Di Laccio is also the founder of the Donne Foundation, dedicated to achieving gender equality in music.

In June 2025 she was appointed a Member of the Order of the British Empire (MBE) for services to music and gender equality. She is Brazilian by birth and also holds Italian and British citizenships.

== Career ==
Di Laccio was born in southern Brazil and has Italian and Brazilian nationalities. She began her singing career under the guidance of the Brazilian soprano Neyde Thomas and graduated with distinction from the University of Music and Fine Arts of Paraná, Brazil. Whilst still at college, Di Laccio joined the Guaira Theatre Opera Company in Brazil and made her professional debut as Barbarina in The Marriage of Figaro. Her early success continued when she was offered a place as a soprano soloist at the Camerata Antiqua of Curitiba concert touring group with whom she performed extensively throughout her native country for many years as a soloist. Di Laccio continued her education at the Royal College of Music in London, where she gained post graduate diplomas in opera performance and as an early music specialist.

Operatic roles include Adina (L'elisir d'amore), Gilda (Rigoletto), Cleopatra (Giulio Cesare), Adele (Die Fledermaus), Despina (Così fan tutte), Zerlina (Don Giovanni), Susanna (The Marriage of Figaro), Semele (Handel), Musetta (La bohème) among others. Baroque opera productions include Platée by Rameau at the Athens Concert Hall in Athens, L'Orfeo by Monteverdi and Dido and Aeneas by Purcell with the English Bach Festival in London.

As a performer of the Baroque repertoire she has sung with the Amaryllis Consort, Il Festino, Concerto Instrumentale, Di Profundis, Baroque Orchestra of Mercosur and Baroque ensemble Florilegium.

On 4 March 2013 she was awarded the Classical Act of the Year 2012 in the Latin-UK Awards sponsored by Spain's Air Europa.

On 11 November 2016 she launched her first solo album Bravura featuring virtuosity arias and instrumental pieces from the Baroque period.

== Charitable causes ==
In 2018, Di Laccio founded the Donne Foundation, a charitable organisation dedicated to achieving gender equality in the music industry. The foundation raises awareness of women composers and musicians past and present, creating opportunities for representation and visibility through research, advocacy, and performance projects.

The Donne Foundation publishes annual data reports tracking gender equality in classical music programming worldwide, and it also runs educational initiatives, campaigns, and performances to support inclusivity across the music sector.

In February 2024, Di Laccio and the Donne Foundation set a Guinness World Record for the **longest acoustic music live stream**, lasting 26 h 18 m 57 s, as part of the “Let HER MUSIC Play” event. The stream featured music exclusively by women and non-binary composers.

In June 2025, Di Laccio was appointed Member of the Order of the British Empire (MBE) in recognition of her services to music and gender equality, reflecting her work with the foundation and her wider activism.

In 2018 Di Laccio was chosen as one of the BBC 100 Women as a soprano and for her contribution through DONNE: Women in Music.

== Honours and awards ==
- 2025: Appointed Member of the Order of the British Empire (MBE) in the King’s Birthday Honours for services to music and gender equality.
- 2024: Guinness World Record – Longest acoustic music live stream (26 h 18 m 57 s)
- 2021: Acquisition International — Most Inspirational Female Musician
- 2019: Guia Londres Woman of the Year Award
- 2018: BBC 100 Women
- 2013: Air Europa Classical Act of the Year
- 2002: Richard III Prize
- 2001: Peter Pears Prize
- Included in The Female Lead: 67 Women Changing the World Today

== See also ==
- Patricia Adkins Chiti, founder of Fondazione Adkins Chiti: Donne in Musica ('The Adkins Chiti Foundation: Women in Music')
- The International Alliance for Women in Music
- The Society of Women Musicians (historic group in the UK)
- Women in classical music
