= Joseph-François Duché de Vancy =

French playwright (1668–1704)

Joseph-François Duché de Vancy (29 October 1668 in Paris – 14 December 1704) was a French playwright.

== Life ==
He was the son of a gentleman in the household of Louis XIV and was himself a valet de chambre du roi. He followed Anne-Jules, 2nd duc de Noailles to Spain as his secretary. His talents gained him a pension from Madame de Maintenon, and a commission from her for Vancy and Jean Racine to compose sacred poems, edifying stories and religious tragedies for the maison de Saint-Cyr (Absalon, Jonathas, Débora). Vancy also wrote opera librettos modelled on Racine, the best known of which were Céphale et Procris and Iphigénie en Tauride (the latter with additions by Antoine Danchet). He was a member of the Académie des inscriptions.

== Works ==
Plays and libretti

- Céphale et Procris, tragédie lyrique, music by Élisabeth Jacquet de La Guerre, Académie royale de musique, 15 March 1694 Text online
- Les Amours de Momus, ballet, music by Henri Desmarets, Académie royale de musique, 25 May 1695 Text online
- Téagène et Chariclée, tragédie lyrique, music by Henri Desmarets, Académie royale de musique, 12 April 1695 Text online
- Les Fêtes galantes, ballet, music by Henri Desmarets, Académie royale de musique, 10 May 1698
- Jonathas, tragedy drawn from the Scriptures, Château de Versailles, 5 December 1699 Text online
- Scylla, tragedy, music by Theobaldo di Gatti, Académie royale de musique, 16 September 1701 Text online
- Débora, tragedy drawn from the Scriptures, 1701
- Iphigénie en Tauride, tragédie lyrique, with Antoine Danchet, music by Henri Desmarets and André Campra, Académie royale de musique, 6 May 1704 Text on line
- Absalon, five-act tragedy drawn from the Scriptures, 7 April 1712 Text online

Varia

- Les Préceptes de Phocylide avec des remarques & des pensées & peintures critiques à l'imitation de cet auteur, 1698 Text online
- Lettres inédites de Duché de Vanci contenant la relation historique du voyage de Philippe d'Anjou, appelé au trône d'Espagne, ainsi que des ducs de Bourgogne et de Berry ses frères, en 1700..., éditées par Colin et Raynaud, Paris : Librairies de Lacroix, 1830. Text online
- Recueil d'histoires édifiantes, pour servir de lectures à de jeunes personnes de condition, 1706
