= Caroline B. Nichols =

American violinist and conductor

Caroline Nichols
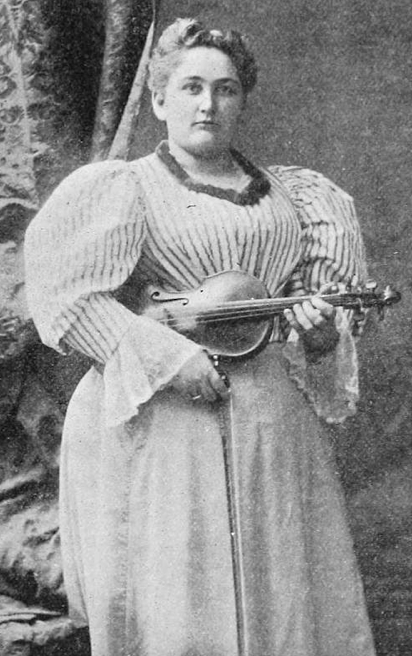
- Portrait of Caroline Nichols in Frances E. Willard's Occupations for Women (1897)
- Born: 1864; Dedham, Massachusetts
- Died: August 17, 1939 (aged 74–75); Boston, Massachusetts
- Occupation: conductor

Caroline B. Nichols (1864–1939) was an American violinist, conductor and founder of the Fadette Ladies Orchestra (known as the Fadettes of Boston). Along with Emma Roberto Steiner, she is credited as one of the first women in the United States to make a successful career out of conducting musical performances.

Nichols was a founding member of Marion Osgood's Ladies Orchestra, and about four years later she became a founding member of the Fadettes of Boston in 1888, a sextet including Ethel Atwood. She quickly rose from first violin to conductor as the small group became a chamber orchestra, assuming leadership in 1890. She led the Fadettes for more than thirty years. The group played and toured until 1920 and played more than 6000 concerts. As a child, she studied violin with Julius Eichberg, Leopold Lichtenberg, and Charles Loeffler. Nichols eventually retired to Boston and trained orchestra members and was instrumental in helping women to be financially independent. She died in Boston in 1939.
