= Gian Paolo Chiti =

Italian musician (1939–2026)

- Born: 21 January 1939; Rome, Italy
- Died: 27 March 2026 (aged 87)

Gian Paolo Chiti (21 January 1939 – 27 March 2026) was an Italian composer and pianist.

== Biography ==
Gian Paolo Chiti began studying music at the age of four, specializing in piano, violin, and composition. At the age of ten, he trained under Armando Renzi before joining the Accademia Nazionale di Santa Cecilia in Rome. His teachers included Carlo Zecchi, Arturo Bonucci, and Arturo Benedetti Michelangeli. In 1960, Chiti won prizes in the Treviso and the Ferruccio Busoni International Piano Competition.

Chiti has had a dual career as a composer and concert pianist. He often performed alongside his late wife, mezzo-soprano Patricia Adkins Chiti. He composed works for film and television as well as concerts and festivals in Italy and abroad. His compositions have featured at the Maggio Musicale Fiorentino, the Venice Biennale, the Edinburgh International Festival, and the Lutosławski Festival.

Since 1984, Chiti has served as the Director of the Composition Department at the Conservatorio of Santa Cecilia in Rome. He is also a member of the Italian National Committee for Dance and serves on the faculty boards of several universities.

== Chronological works list ==
This list includes all serious concert music composed by Gian Paolo Chiti, including works for young musicians. It does not include transcriptions and arrangements, film and television scores or popular works.

- Zoological Garden (solo piano – young performers) (1951)
- O Sacrum Convivium (SATB chorus) (1958)
- Sestetto a fiato n° 1 (flute, clarinet, 2 bassoons, trumpet, trombone) (1954)
- Sestetto a fiato n° 2 (flute, 2 bassoons, 2 horns, trumpet in C) (1958)
- Quartetto per Archi (string quartet) (1959)
- Cinque preludi per pianoforte (1961)
- Suite per pianoforte n° 2 (1961)
- Tre mottetti per coro misto (SATB chorus) (1961)
- Per orchestra (for orchestra) (1962)
- Tre pezzi per pianoforte (1962)
- Concerto per orchestra d’archi (for string orchestra) (1963)
- Concerto per dieci strumenti (for ten instruments) (flute, oboe, clarinet, horn, vibraphone, timpani, harp, violin, viola, violoncello) (1964)
- Due mottetti a cappella (SATB chorus) (1964)
- Inscription (solo flute) (1966)
- Nachtmusik (for strings) (1966)
- Serenade per cinque strumenti (flute, bass clarinet, viola, violoncello, piano) (1966)
- Divertimento n° 2 (flute, violin, viola, violoncello) (1967)
- Especially When The October Wind (medium voice, piano) (1967)
- Holy Sonnet of John Donne (medium voice, piano) (1967)
- Pilatus (contralto, tenor, organ) (1968)
- Ricercare ’70 (2 oboes, bassoon, 2 horns, strings)(1968)
- We lying by the Sea Sand (high voice, piano) (1968)
- Y Ara Dirè (two guitars) (1969)
- Conversation with myself (solo violin) (1969)
- Matrona Quaedam (chamber opera) (1969)
- Violin concerto (solo violin, orchestra) (1969)
- In Dateless Night (string quartet) (1970/1)
- Into my own (solo organ) (1971)
- Lebenslauf (clarinet, violin, viola, violoncello, piano) (1971)
- Sie erlischt (violin, piano) (1971)
- Yerma (ballet) (1971)
- A Dylan Thomas (ballet) (1972)
- Andante (flute, bassoon, pianoforte) (1968)
- Divertimento (flute, violin, harpsichord) (1972)
- Elegia (flute, piano) (1972)
- Movements per pianoforte (1972)
- Breakers (four harps) (1973)
- El Icaro (solo harpsichord) (1973)
- Ottetto per 2 soprani, 2 contralti, 2 tenori, 2 bassi (for SATB/SATB) (1973)
- Rencontres (flute, strings) (1973)
- Spleen (treble and bass recorders, violoncello, piano) (1973)
- Dal profondo (clarinet, bassoon, piano) (1974)
- Prelude d’automne (flute, viola, harp) (1975)
- Replay (2 flutes, 2 oboes, 2 bassoons, 2 horns) (1975)
- Shahed-B (oboe, harpsichord) (1975)
- Games Around the Six with Eleven (string orchestra) (1976)
- Persefone (solo flute, flute in G and flute in C) (1977)
- Piccola raccolta per organo (1978)
- Rondeau (solo flute) (1978)
- Anthem (solo violoncello) (1979)
- In Mind (solo guitar) (1979)
- Flutar (flute, harp) (1979)
- Pastorale (flute, harp) (1979)
- Preludio romantico (piano – young performers) (1979)
- Piccola suite per pianoforte (piano – young performers) (1980)
- Serenata (flute, oboe, bassoon) (1980)
- Around (solo guitar) (1981)
- Melodia (B♭ clarinet, piano) (1981)
- Adieu adieu (wind quintet: flute, oboe, clarinet, and bassoon, horn) (1982)
- Rag prelude per pianoforte (1982)
- Retour (solo violin, viola and violoncello, string orchestra) (1982)
- Trivium (mezzo-soprano, string orchestra) (1983)
- Arion (solo guitar) (1983)
- In the Merry Month of May (brass quintet: 2 trumpets, flugelhorn, horn, trombone, tuba) (1983)
- Kammerstück (clarinet, violoncello, trombone, piano) (1983)
- Konzertstuck (orchestra) (1984)
- Per lontane vie per pianoforte (1985)
- Ground (piano four hands) (1985)
- Ipodyon (solo harp) (1985)
- Triplum (flute, violin, harpsichord) (1985)
- Wintermusik (flute, clarinet, violon, violoncello, piano) (1985)
- In Sogno (two flutes: doubling piccolo, flute, alto flute, bass flute and piano) (1986)
- Recordari (trumpet in C, organ) (1986)
- Tropi per chartres (alto saxophone, string quartet) (1996)
- Fogli d’album (Albumblatter) (solo guitar) (1987)
- Abendstucke per pianoforte (1989)
- Action (flute, oboe, clarinet, bassoon, 2 violins, viola, violoncello) (1990)
- European suite (solo guitar) (1990)
- Kinamama (two flutes, piano) (1990)
- Octopus Line (flute, oboe, clarinet, 2 bassoons, horn, 2 trumpets, 2 trombones) (1990)
- Salve regina (mezzo-soprano, flute, oboe, clarinet, bassoon, strings) (1991)
- European Lieder Book (high voice, piano) (1992)
- Intermezzo (violin, viola, violoncello) (1992)
- Arion suite per pianoforte (1993)
- Cahier des Reves (violin, violoncello, piano) (1993)
- Tre liriche su poesie di J. Basile (soprano, piano) (1993)
- Triple (flute, clarinet, bassoon) (1993)
- Concertino per sax tenore e otto violoncelli (tenor saxophone, cello octet) (1994)
- Sur les bois oubliés (solo viola) (1995)
- Rime (medium voice, viola, piano) (1998)
- Laudarium in onore della beata vergine Maria (SATB chorus, brass ensemble) (2000)
- Plexus (two bass flutes) (2001)
- Envers (orchestra) (2002)
- Extrême per pianoforte (2002)
- Seagulls per pianoforte (2002)
- En ecoutant la nuit (string quartet) (2003)
- L’età dell’ombra (clarinet, viola, piano) (2003)
- Burlesque (solo tenor saxophone) (2005)
- Capriccio (B♭ clarinet) (2005)
- Counterpoint in F (B♭ clarinet, tenor saxophone) (2005)
- Prelude (alto saxophone, piano) (2005)
- Two liturgical pieces (organ) (2005)
- Viorgan for viola and organ (2007)
- Blackround (solo bassoon) (2007)
- Florale (clarinet in B and guitar) (2008)
- Nual (clarinet in B and guitar) (2008)
- Sonatensatz (solo piano) (2008)
- Under the Left Hand (solo piano) (2008)
- Saxitude (saxophone quartet) (2008)
- Chaconne retrouvée (alto saxophone) (2009)
- Teorìte (solo double bassoon) (2009)
- Memoires (3 trumpets in B) (2009)
- Chopin Promenade (string quartet) (2009)
- Quaternalis (horns quartet) (2009)
- October quintet (string quartet and piano) (2010)
- The Dorian way (oboe, celesta, 16 strings) (2010)
- Fluàl (flute and guitar) (2012)
- Languisco e moro (omaggio a Gesualdo da Venosa) (violin, viola and piano) (2012)
