= Ethel Atwood =

American musician (1870–1948)

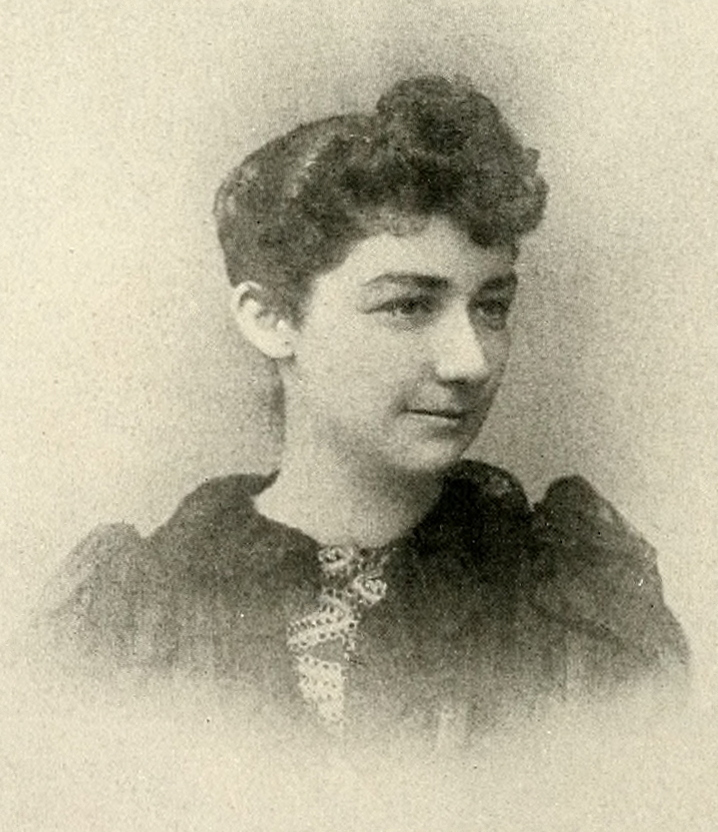
- Ethel Atwood (ca. 1893)

Background information
- Born: September 12, 1870; Fairfield, Maine, United States
- Died: April 9, 1948 (aged 77) Los Angeles, California
- Occupation: Instrumentalist
- Instrument: Violin

Ethel Atwood (September 12, 1870 – April 9, 1948) was an American musician and orchestra leader. With Caroline B. Nichols, she established the Fadette Ladies' Orchestra.

== Biography ==
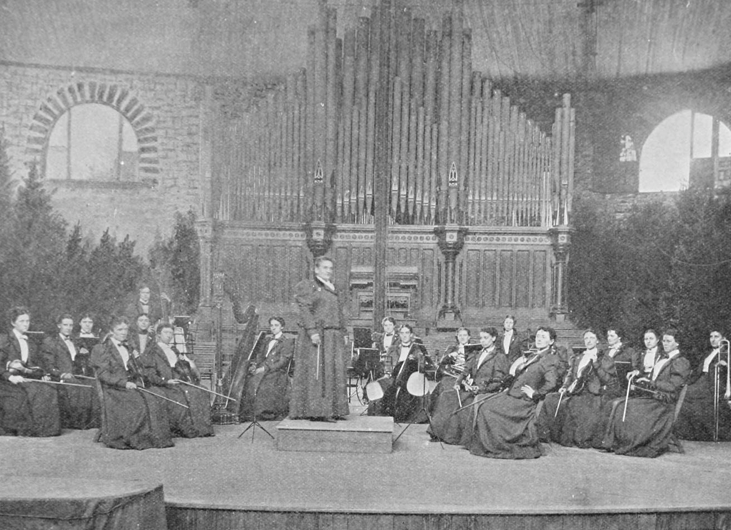
The Fadettes (ca.1897)

Born in Fairfield, Maine in 1870, her parents were Yankees. After spending the first 15 years of Atwood's life in Fairfield, she moved to Boston. Atwood began the study of the violin when eight years old.

Atwood and Caroline B. Nichols organized the Fadette Ladies' Orchestra, with four pieces. Atwood immediately had the name of her orchestra copyrighted and, renting an office, she put out her "shingle". Finding that prompting was essential to success in dance work, she went to one of Boston's best prompters and learned the business thoroughly. An elocutionist taught her to use her voice to the best advantage. She then became the only lady prompter in the U.S. Business increased rapidly in the next few years, growing the regular members of the orchestra to 13 young women.
