= Fadettes of Boston =

American all-women orchestra

- All-women orchestra
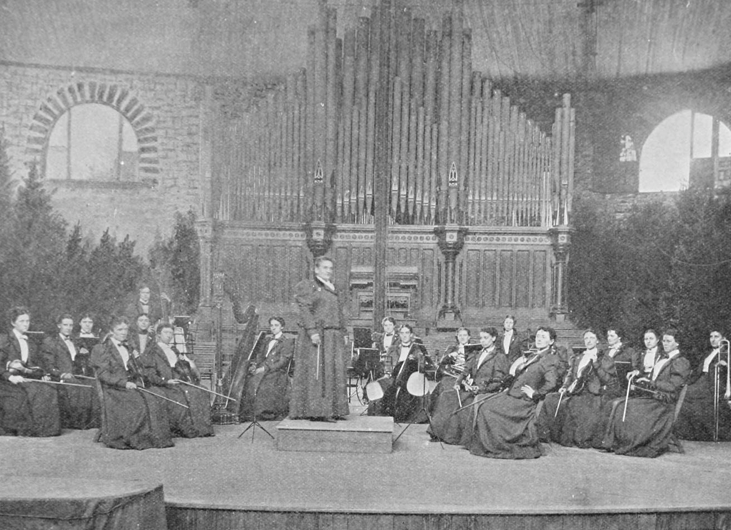
- The Fadettes, c. 1897
- Former name: Fadette Ladies' Orchestra
- Founded: October 1, 1888
- Disbanded: 1927
- Location: Boston, Massachusetts, United States
- Concert hall: Keith's Theatre
- Music director: Caroline B. Nichols

The Fadettes of Boston was an American all-women orchestra based in Boston, Massachusetts, that was active during the late 19th and early 20th centuries. Founded by Caroline B. Nichols and organized and managed by Ethel Atwood, it was formed on October 1, 1888, as the Fadette Ladies' Orchestra, named after the titular character of George Sand's novel La Petite Fadette. The Fadettes, among other female-only orchestras, challenged gender norms of the 19th and 20th centuries, as many orchestral instruments were deemed inappropriate for women to play.

The ensemble originally comprised six women who rarely went on tour, but as the Fadettes grew in size and popularity, they played for paying audiences and toured across the United States and Canada. The orchestra also had a brass quartet known as the Boston Fadettes Ladies Brass Quartette. Between 1890 and 1920, the Fadettes performed at an estimated 6,000 concerts, largely due to a contract with vaudeville manager B.F. Keith signed in 1898. In 1895, Atwood attempted to sell the right to use the orchestra's name at the time, the "Fadette Ladies' Orchestra". Nichols, along with other members of the orchestra, left and formed another orchestra called "The Fadettes" while using the original name. The Massachusetts Supreme Court ruled that the musicians could not be put under another's control.

The orchestra's success led to them replacing the Boston Symphony Orchestra during performances at Keith's Theatre in 1902. After the orchestra stopped touring in 1918, Nichols's interest in the use of music in silent films led them to accompany movies that screened in New York and Boston theaters, including the Roxy Theatre. Following an infrequent concert schedule starting in 1924, the Fadettes of Boston disbanded in 1927.

== Background and history ==
During the 19th and 20th centuries, women faced discrimination in the music industry; according to American feminist historian and music scholar Beth Abelson Macleod, women were allowed to play music, but their choice of instruments was severely limited. Instruments such as pianos, guitars, and harps were tolerated due to their delicate sound equivalent to the soprano. Additionally, these types of instruments, as noted by Maureen Buja of Interlude and Macleod, did not interfere with the graceful image that women were expected to portray. Other late 19th-century writers attributed the characteristics of music, such as being the "interpreter and language of the emotions", to women. On the other hand, according to classical music critic John Sullivan Dwight, string instruments such as violins, violas, and cellos were seen as inappropriate for women to play. Musicians of the time, including Prussian composer Gustave Kerker, writing for the Musical Standard, discouraged women from playing wind and brass instruments, and women were told that they were not strong or skilled enough for larger instruments such as tubas and drums.

This discrimination led to the rise of all-women orchestras, originally known as lady orchestras. Some of the earliest known examples were the Vienna Ladies Orchestra in 1867, alongside others in New York City and Boston that were formed in the early 1870s. American musicologist Judith Tick and music historian Christine Ammer note that the popularity of lady orchestras stemmed from them playing instruments that were typically reserved for men. One of the more notable women's ensembles was the Fadette Ladies' Orchestra, (Note: Also known as the Boston Fadette Lady Orchestra, the Fadette Woman's Orchestra, the Fadette Women's Orchestra, and the Fadette Ladies Orchestra.) established on October 1, 1888, by conductor and violinist Caroline B. Nichols, (Note: Her surname was misspelled as Nicholas by Maureen Buja (2018).) making her one of the first female orchestra conductors in the United States. Nichols was previously a founder of and violinist for the Marion Osgood Ladies Orchestra, which she and five other women left because Nichols found the orchestra's rules too restrictive. The Fadette Ladies' Orchestra was organized and managed by musician Ethel Atwood, who also served as second violinist, and Nichols served as first violinist. The orchestra was named after Fanchon Fadette, the titular character of George Sand's novel La Petite Fadette, as they, like the character herself, strived to bring happiness to their audience.

The Fadette Ladies' Orchestra was incorporated in 1895 as the Fadettes of Boston; the incorporation, according to Nichols, came seven years after the orchestra's opening performances in 1888. Following the 1895 incorporation, Nichols delegated the orchestra's financial responsibilities to first clarinetist Viola Dunn. Originally a sextet, the orchestra grew to 20 by 1898, the same year vaudeville manager B.F. Keith booked the group into his theatres, and to 30 by 1902. The orchestra toured across the United States and Canada and included violinists, violists, and drummers, as well as musicians such as Annie Andros Hawley, Mildred Rogers, and violinist Lillian Thain. The Fadettes also had a brass quartet, known as the Boston Fadette Ladies Brass Quartette. During her 32 years in charge of the orchestra, Nichols musically and professionally trained over 600 women.

=== Court case ===
After organizing the Fadette Ladies' Orchestra, Atwood had the orchestra's name copyrighted. After leaving the orchestra some time in the 1890s, she sold her interest in the Fadettes Ladies' Orchestra to Mary Messer on October 18, 1895, and Messer briefly took over organizing the orchestra's performances. However, all the members of the orchestra, including Nichols, soon left and formed another corporation called simply "The Fadettes", and began to perform under that name while also using the name "Fadette Ladies' Orchestra". Articles from The Boston Globe on November 10 and November 30, 1895, listed Nichols as the orchestra's leader and Messer as the manager and agent, with the November 10 article referring to Messer as the "successor" to Atwood. Messer sued Nichols on January 14, 1896, to prevent the orchestra from going under the name "The Fadettes", but lost the suit. Five days later, she reportedly advertised the orchestra as the "Original Fadette Women's Orchestra", disputing her ownership, and appealed in March 1897 to the Massachusetts Supreme Court (Messer v. The Fadettes, 168 Mass. 140, 46 N.E. 407), which ruled in a split decision that Messer could not enforce her rights to the name "Fadette Ladies' Orchestra" by injunctions, because the value of the name depended solely on Atwood's own reputation and skill: "there was nothing in her relation to [the orchestra] that she could convey". The court determined that the musicians employed by Atwood could not be put under Messer's control or ownership, citing the Thirteenth Amendment in their rationale. American jurisprudence has cited the Messer v. The Fadettes case regarding the protection of musical group names against unauthorized use and unfair competition.

=== Concerts and later years ===
Newspaper spread about the Fadettes performing in vaudeville, Pittsburgh Press, 1909

According to Nichols, the Fadettes gave over 6,000 concerts between 1890 and 1920, with half of them as headliners in first-class vaudeville theatres. At a concert in Pittsburgh in 1902, for instance, the Fadettes played marches, waltzes, songs and arias by Frederick Field Bullard, Daniel Auber, Karl Michael Ziehrer, and George M. Rosey, among others. The group also performed at the Los Angeles Orpheum, and the Fadettes replaced the Boston Symphony Orchestra at Keith's Theatre in the summer of 1902. This decision drew backlash from the press during the early 20th century.

The Fadettes of Boston stopped touring in 1918; around that year, their music accompanied films that played in Boston and New York theatres, including the Roxy Theatre. This change was due to Nichols's growing curiosity about musical accompaniment for silent films. From 1888 to 1920, the Fadettes donated over $500,000 ($17.9 million in 2025) to over 600 female musicians. The orchestra disbanded in 1927 following a sporadic concert schedule that started in 1924.

== Performance style and legacy ==
The Fadettes of Boston initially operated as a club of local women, but as it expanded, it began touring more regularly and performing for paying audiences. The orchestra occasionally performed vaudeville acts; vaudeville actor Joe Laurie Jr. described one in which the orchestra members left the stage and Nichols played ten instruments in their place. The performers wore white shimmery gowns, which were considered traditionally feminine, while playing a wide variety of instruments that were considered unbefitting of women. Nichols was commemorated in a song called "The Fadette Two-Step" (1904), and, in June 1952, nine of the Fadettes reunited in Boston to celebrate the golden jubilee of their first season with Keith.

In 1919, women began entering men's orchestras, and women's orchestras generally became more prominent around the 1920s and 1930s, with women horn players in particular becoming more common. According to Macleod, the prevalence of women in the music industry led to women's uniforms shifting from white dresses similar to what the Fadettes wore to more formal black outfits, hinting at a more refined and professional ensemble. However, after the Fadettes of Boston was formed, gender discrimination in the music industry did not fully subside; for example, pianist Olga Samaroff noted that critics who did not like her music said that she "played like a woman". Furthermore, major orchestras did not include women until the 1960s.

== See also ==
- Women's club movement in the United States – Women's social movement
