= Vítězslava Kaprálová =

Czech composer and conductor (1915–1940)

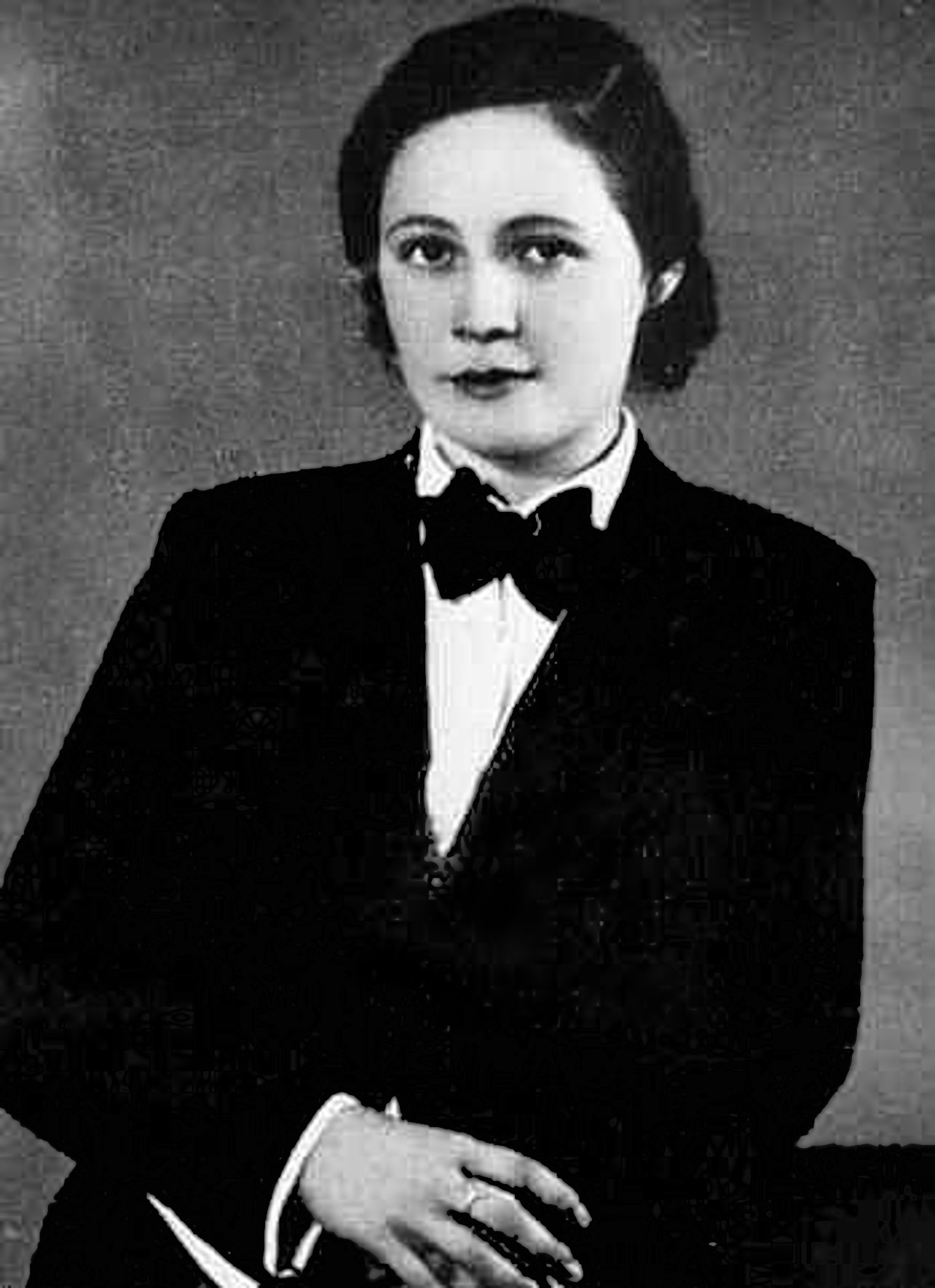
- Kaprálová in 1935
- Born: 24 January 1915; Brno, Moravia, Austria-Hungary
- Died: 16 June 1940 (aged 25); Montpellier, France
- Occupations: Composer; Conductor
- Works: List of compositions
- Style: 20th-century classical music
- Website: www.kapralova.org

Vítězslava Kaprálová (Czech pronunciation: [ˈvi:cɛslava ˈkapra:lova:]; 24 January 1915 – 16 June 1940) was a Czech composer and conductor of 20th-century classical music.

== Life and career ==
Vítězslava Kaprálová was born in Brno, Moravia, Austria-Hungary (now the Czech Republic), a daughter of composer Václav Kaprál and singer Vítězslava Kaprálová (née Viktorie Uhlířová). From 1930 to 1935 she studied composition with Vilém Petrželka and conducting with Zdeněk Chalabala at the Brno Conservatory. She continued her musical education with Vítězslav Novák (1935–37) and Václav Talich (1935–36) in Prague and with Bohuslav Martinů, Charles Munch (1937–39) and, according to some unverified accounts, with Nadia Boulanger (1940) in Paris. In 1937 she conducted the Czech Philharmonic and a year later the BBC Orchestra in her composition Military Sinfonietta. Her husband was the Czech writer Jiří Mucha, whom she married two months before she died.

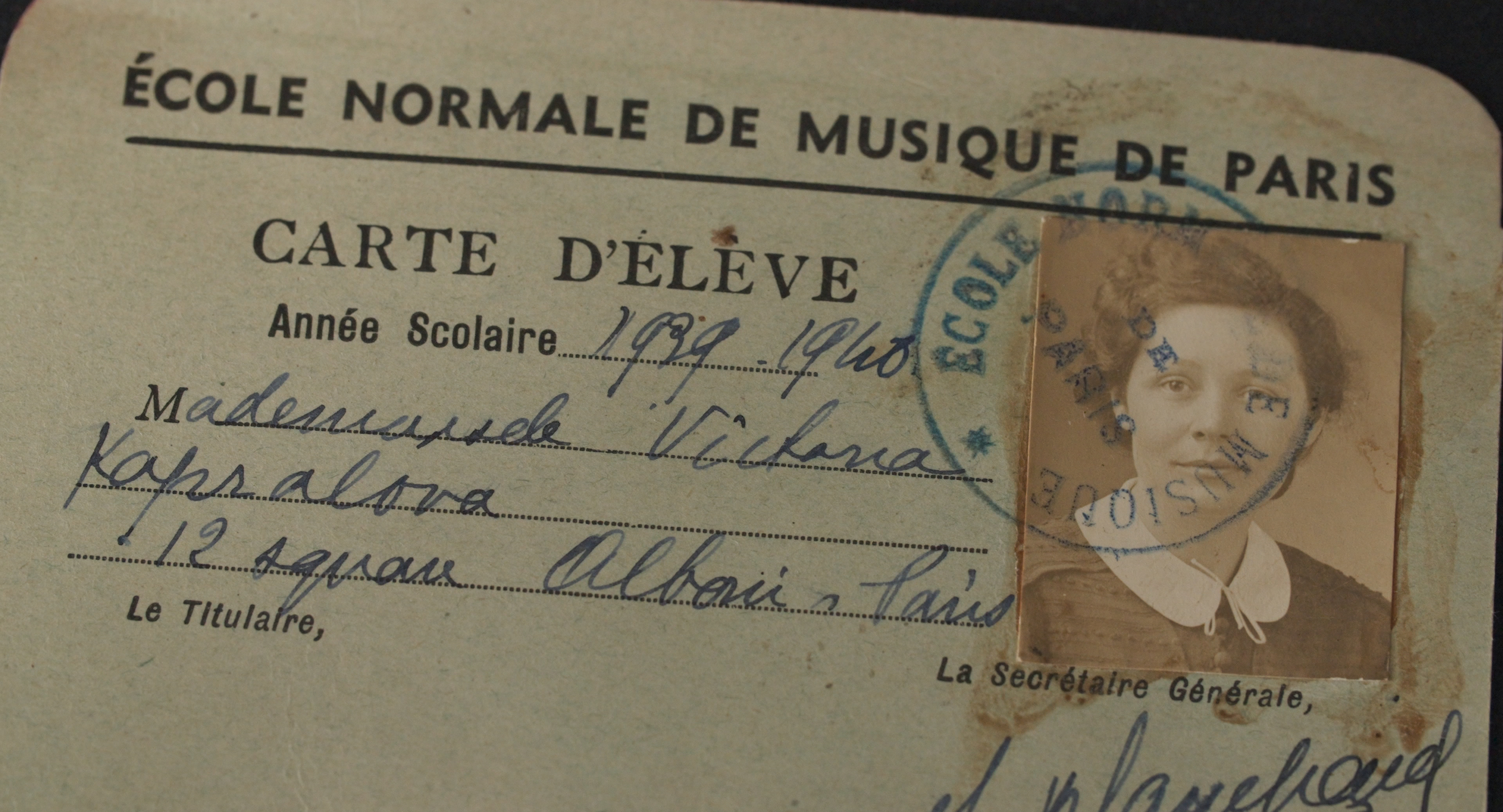
Vítězslava Kaprálová’s student ID card from the École Normale de Musique de Paris for the 1939–1940 academic year

Despite her untimely death, which may have been caused by typhoid fever, in Montpellier, France at the age of 25, Kaprálová created an impressive body of work. Her music was admired by Rafael Kubelík, who premiered her orchestral song Waving Farewell and also conducted her other orchestral works. Among the many interpreters of her piano music was pianist Rudolf Firkušný, for whom Kaprálová composed her best known piano work Dubnová preludia (April Preludes). In 1946, in appreciation of her distinctive contribution, the foremost academic institution in the country—the Czech Academy of Sciences and the Arts - awarded Kaprálová membership in memoriam. By 1948 this honour was bestowed on only 10 women, out of 648 members of the Academy.

The first English monograph on the composer was published in 2011 in the United States by Lexington Books, an imprint of Rowman & Littlefield. An English biography of Kaprálová followed in 2026, published by Nakladatelství Klíč in the Czech Republic. Kaprálová was "Composer of the Week" on BBC Radio 3 from Monday 12 October to Friday 16 October 2015, a set of five one-hour programs playing her music and discussing her life. In 2021, Kaprálová was among the 58 personalities featured by the exhibition Portraits de France, organized under the auspices of Emmanuel Macron in Paris, from December 1, 2021 to February 14, 2022. The 29 women and 29 men made the final cut from the original 318 nominees to be commemorated and celebrated for their contribution to the "national narrative of France."

== Compositions ==
Grave of Vítězslava Kaprálová at Brno Central Cemetery

Kaprálová's catalogue includes her highly regarded art songs and music for piano solo, and a string quartet, a reed trio, music for cello, music for violin and piano, an orchestral cantata, two piano concertos, two orchestral suites, a sinfonietta, and a concertino for clarinet, violin, and orchestra. Much of her music was published during her lifetime and continues to be published today by various publishing houses, including Schott and Bärenreiter Verlag. In addition, her music has been released on record and compact disc by a variety of labels, including Chandos, Naxos, Koch International, Albany Records, Centaur Records, Delos Productions, Gramola, Claves Records, Supraphon, and many others.

== Legacy ==
=== The Kapralova Society ===
Kaprálová's legacy has been promoted by the Kapralova Society, a music society founded in 1998 in Toronto, Canada. The society has been also seeking to redress the gender imbalance in classical music through public education and Kapralova Society Journal, "a journal of women in music".

=== In popular culture ===
- Featured in Season 3, episodes 6 and 9, of the television series Mozart in the Jungle.
- Featured in The Glass Room by Simon Mawer

== List of compositions ==
Selected works

- Suite en miniature, op. 1 for small orchestra
- Two Compositions for Violin and Piano, op. 3
- Two Songs, op. 4
- Song cycle Sparks from Ashes, op. 5
- January, for voice, flute, two violins, violoncello and piano
- Sonata Appassionata, op. 6 for piano
- Piano Concerto in D Minor, op. 7
- String Quartet, op. 8
- Grotesque Passacaglia for piano
- Three Piano Pieces, op. 9
- Song cycle Apple from the Lap, op. 10
- Sad Evening, for voice and large orchestra
- Military Sinfonietta, op. 11 for large orchestra
- Song cycle Forever, op. 12
- April Preludes, op. 13 for piano
- Waving Farewell, op. 14 for voice and piano / large orchestra
- Trio for Oboe, Clarinet, and Bassoon
- Ilena, op. 15. Cantata for soli, mixed choir, reciter and large orchestra
- Variations sur le carillon de l'église St-Étienne-du-Mont, op. 16 for piano
- Two Choruses for Women's Voices a cappella, op. 17
- Elegy, for violin and piano
- Suita Rustica, op. 19 for large orchestra
- Partita, op. 20 for strings and piano
- Concertino for Violin, Clarinet and Orchestra, op. 21
- Song cycle Sung into the Distance, op. 22
- Deux ritournelles, op. 25 for violoncello and piano

== Selected discography ==
- Orchestral Works (Suite en miniature, Piano Concerto, Military Sinfonietta, Suita rustica, Partita) Vítězslava Kaprálová: The Completed Orchestral Works, 2CD, CPO 555 568-2
- Orchestral Music (Prélude de Noël, Suite en miniature, Military Sinfonietta, Piano Concerto, orchestral songs Waving Farewell and Sad Evening) Kaprálová: Orchestral music, CD, Naxos 8.574144
- Complete piano music La Vita: Leonie Karatas plays Vítězslava Kaprálová, CD, EuroArts 2069107
- Music for piano / piano and violin Vítězslava Kaprálová, CD, Koch Records KIC-CD-7742
- Art songs Forever Kaprálová: Songs, CD, Supraphon SU3752-2 231
- String quartet Kaprál-Kaprálová-Martinů, CD, Radioservis CRO618-2

== Bibliography ==
=== Books ===
- Gates, Eugene and Karla Hartl, eds. The Women in Music Anthology. The Kapralova Society, 2021.
- Hartl, Karla. A Little Book about Vítězslava Kaprálová. Nakladatelství Klíč, 2026.
- Hartl, Karla. Vítězslava Kaprálová. Thematic Catalog of Works. Baerenreiter Praha, 2026.
- Hartl, Karla and Erik Entwistle, eds. The Kaprálová Companion. Lexington Books, 2011.

=== Dissertations and Master's theses ===
- Blalock, Marta. Analysis and performance problems of Vítězslava Kaprálová’s String quartet, op. 8 (1935-1936). DMA dissertation. University of Georgia, 2008.
- Cooledge, Tiffany Lynn. Czech Female Composers and their Music for Bassoon: Expanding the Repertoire Methodically by Focusing on a Geographic Region. DMA dissertation. University of Wisconsin-Madison, 2023.
- Jandura, Tereza. Her Own Voice: The Art Songs of Vítězslava Kaprálová. DMA dissertation. University of Arizona, 2009.
- Lytle, Rebecca. An Analysis of Selected Works of Vítězslava Kaprálová. Master's thesis, University of Texas at El Paso, 2008.

=== Articles ===
- Armstrong, Asher Ian (Winter 2023). "Ephemeral Incandescence: the April Preludes of Vítězslava Kaprálová" (PDF). Kapralova Society Journal. 21 (1): 1–4.
- Armstrong, Asher Ian (2025). "Vítězslava Kaprálová's Sonata Appassionata: The Pianist Perspective" (PDF). Kapralova Society Journal. 23 (1): 1–7.
- Blalock, Marta (Spring 2010). "Kaprálová's String Quartet, op. 8" (PDF). Kapralova Society Journal. 8 (1): 1–10.
- Cheek, Timothy. "Navždy (Forever) Kaprálová: Reevaluating Czech composer Vítězslava Kaprálová through her thirty songs." Kapralova Society Journal 3, no. 2 (Fall 2005): 1-6.
- Cheek, Timothy. "Sad Evening, Great Discovery: Bringing to Light a New Song by Vítězslava Kaprálová" Kapralova Society Journal 12, no. 1 (Spring 2014): 1-7.
- Egeling, Stephane. "Kaprálová’s Trio for oboe, clarinet and bassoon." Kapralova Society Journal 9, no. 2 (Fall 2011): 5-8.
- Entwistle, Erik (2025). "Kaprálová's Bell Tower" (PDF). Kapralova Society Journal. 23 (1): 8–9.
- Entwistle, Erik. "To je Julietta. Martinů, Kaprálová and Musical Symbolism." Kapralova Society Newsletter 2, no. 2 (Fall 2004): 1-15.
- Fischer, Christine. "Ending Republican Gender Politics: Kaprálová's Cantata Ilena." Kapralova Society Journal 18, no. 2 (Summer 2020): 1–11.
- Hartl, Karla. "Kaprálová as a Composer of the Week. The BBC Interview." Journal of Czech and Slovak Music 29 (2020): 204–221.
- Hartl, Karla (Summer 2024). "Kaprálová at the Proms: The Bachtrack Interview" (PDF). Kapralova Society Journal. 22 (2): 10–13.
- Hartl, Karla. "The Power of Advocacy in Music: The Case of Vítězslava Kaprálová." Journal of Czech and Slovak Music 27 (2018): 4–32.
- Hartl, Karla (Winter 2023). "Vítězslava Kaprálová: Thematic Catalogue of the Works. An Introduction" (PDF). Kapralova Society Journal. 21 (1): 5–11.
- Houtchens, Alan. "Love's Labour's Lost: Martinů, Kaprálová and Hitler." In Irish Musical Studies 4, pp. 127–132. Edited by Patrick F. Devine & Harry White. Dublin: Four Courts Press, 1996.
- Jandura, Tereza. "Kaprálová’s Jablko s klína, op. 10." Kapralova Society Journal 9, no. 1 (Spring 2011): 1-11.
- Kostaš, Martin. "An Analysis of Compositional Methods Applied in Kaprálová’s Cantata Ilena, op. 15." Kapralova Society Journal 10, no. 1 (Spring 2012): 1–6.
- Koukl, Giorgio. "Vítězslava Kaprálová: Two Dances for Piano, op. 23 (1940). An attempt at reconstruction of the autograph." Kapralova Society Journal 18, no. 1 (Winter 2020): 8–12.
- Latour, Michelle. "Kaprálová’s song Leden." Kapralova Society Journal 9, no. 1 (2011): 1-4.
- Latour, Michelle. "Kaprálová’s Vteřiny, op. 18." Kapralova Society Journal 10, no. 1 (Spring 2012): 7–10.
- Page, Diane M. (Fall 2012). "Kaprálová and the Muses: Understanding the Qualified Composer" (PDF). Kapralova Society Journal. 10 (2): 1–6.
- Svatos, Thomas D. "On the Literary Reception of Kaprálová and Martinů: Jiří Mucha's Peculiar Loves and Miroslav Barvík's 'At Tři Studně.'" Zwischentöne 2 (2017): 71-90.
- Vejvarová, Michaela. "Vítězslava Kaprálová's Last Concertino." Czech Music 4 (2001): 6-7.
