= Emma Roberto Steiner =

American conductor and composer (1856–1929)

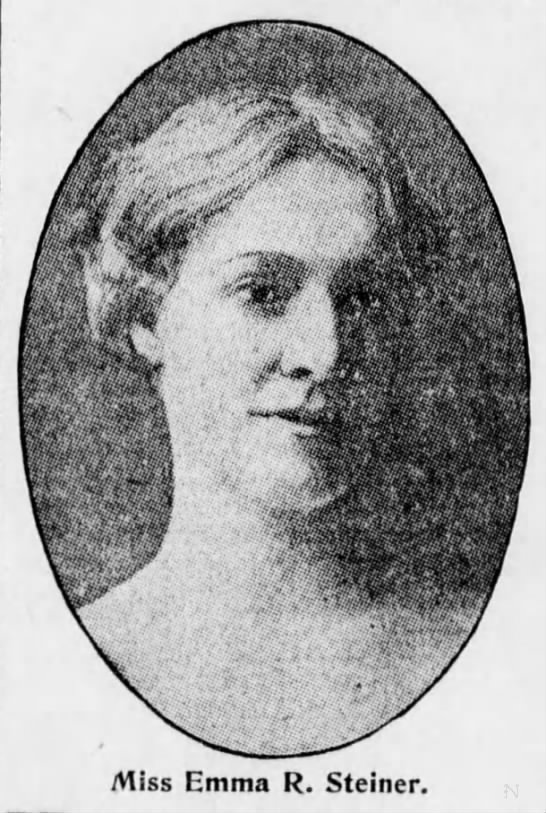
- Born: 1852; Baltimore
- Occupations: Composer, conductor

Emma Roberta Steiner (1856 – February 27, 1929) was an American composer and conductor. She was one of the first women in the United States to make a living from conducting, and did so at more than 6,000 performances during her lifetime. She was additionally the first woman to conduct a Theatre orchestra in New York. Her career spanned nearly five decades, from the 1870s, when she first began conducting for touring comic opera companies, until her death in 1929. In the early 1900s, she took a decade-long hiatus from her musical career to move to Alaska, where she was a prospector and traveler. Steiner wrote hundreds of musical pieces, including seven operas.

== Biography ==
Steiner was born in Baltimore, Maryland, in 1856. Her father, Colonel Frederick Steiner, was a Mexican War hero and her mother an accomplished pianist. Thus, she was exposed to music at a young age, composing songs by age 7 and a piano duet at 9. Others recognized her talents early, and even suggested to her father that he send her to Paris to study music, but her parents refused and did not encourage her to develop the talent. She nonetheless continued composing, starting on an opera at age 11, Aminaide, one scene of which was produced at the Peabody Conservatory, a prominent music school in Baltimore that Steiner was not able to attend.

Music historians are unsure exactly how or when, but by the age of 21, Steiner had left her family behind to pursue her musical career. She moved to Chicago, where she became assistant music director at the Rice and Collier Opera Company, run by American musical-theatre composer E. E. Rice. However, there is still ambiguity around what her first steps were into the realm of professional music making. Some say that she was noticed for her beautiful singing, other say it was her light music which garnished attention, while others point to the important role E. E. Rice played in hiring her, despite her being a woman. In the following years, she worked as a conductor for a series of touring light opera companies that performed Gilbert and Sullivan and other comic operas that were popular during that period. In 1889 and again in 1891, her opera Fleurette was produced to good reviews. Steiner rose to further prominence when one of her compositions was performed at the 1893 Chicago World's Columbian Exhibition. The next year, she conducted a performance of her own works in New York City by the well-respected Anton Seidl Orchestra. It is said that she thought this to be her proudest moment of her career thus far.

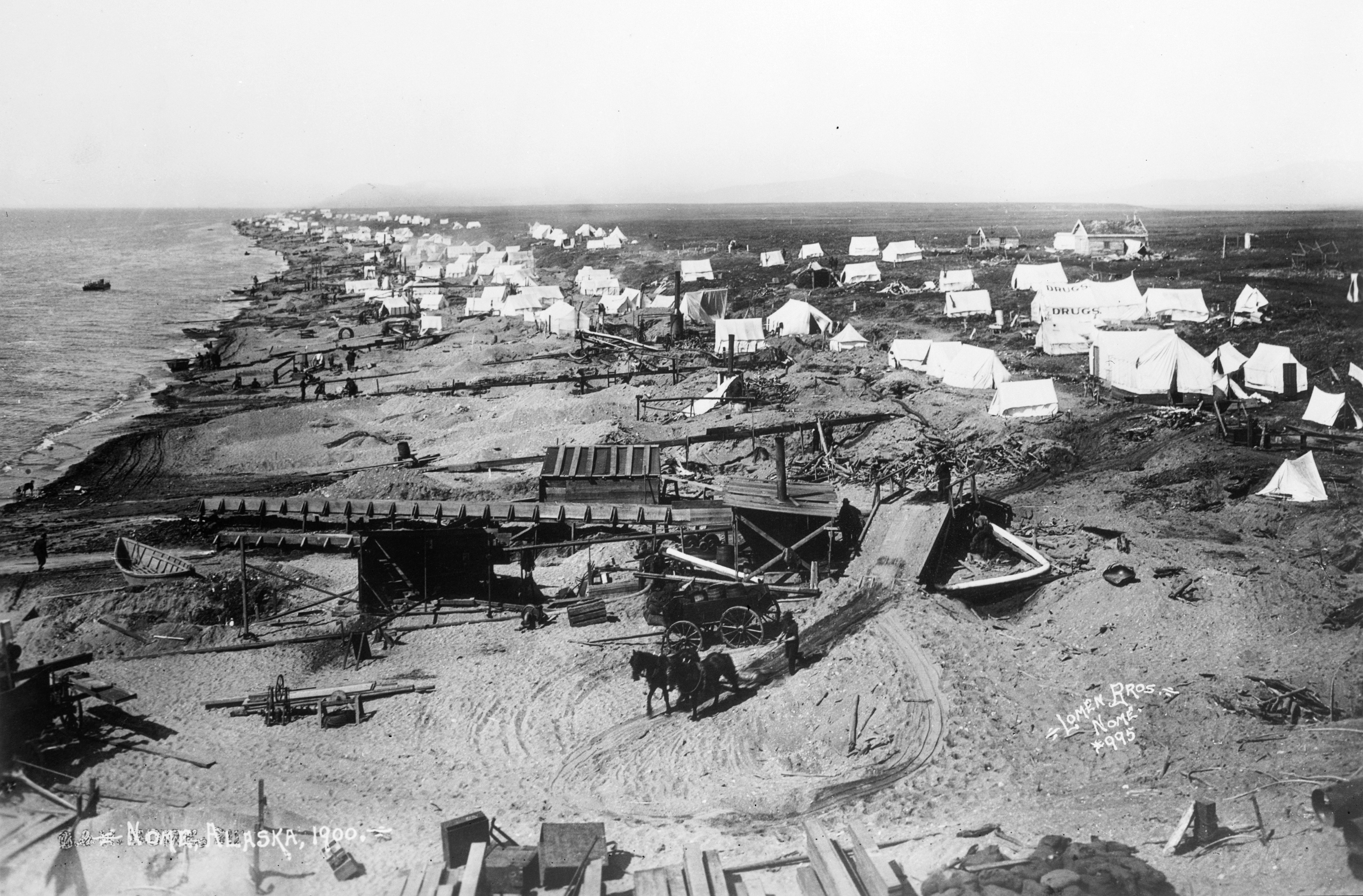
Nome, Alaska in 1900, a few years before Steiner arrived, was little more than a tent city.

Despite a bout of pneumonia in 1896, Steiner continued to conduct, compose, and perform. Among the many people she worked for, including George Baker, Maurice Grau, and Julius Howe, was the conductor and Metropolitan Opera Director Heinrich Conried. During his time at The MET from 1903-1908, he had considered allowing her to conduct at the theatre, but was off-put due to her feminine stature, such a statement being a radical choice for the early 20th century. She continued developing her musical dexterity by founding the company Emma R. Steiner Gaiety Opera Company, one of the first and only female-led and female-advocating opera companies in America in the late 1890s. However, by 1900 her eyesight was worsening due to her contraction of an unknown illness, but also funding for her operas was started to become difficult to obtain. Despite this, she continued composing and created the operas The Man From Paris in 1900, and later The Burra Pundit in 1907/08.

In order to continue writing and producing her operas, she left for Nome, Alaska to pan for gold. There, she became traveler and a prospector in the tin mining fields northwest of Nome, where she was highly regarded due to her discovery of important tin deposits. She then educated herself in mineralogy and metallurgy during her study at Columbia University. Following her return after nearly a decade, she became an outspoken advocate for Alaska, often giving talks about the state and its history. But later, she again turned to music and continued writing and performing into the 1920s. The Metropolitan Opera held a special performance of her works in 1925, the last time a woman would conduct there until 1976. She also helped found a home for elderly and infirm musicians, to which she dedicated the proceeds of some of her later concerts. In its obituary after her death on February 27, 1929, The New York Times claimed that the stress of running the home had brought on the collapse that ended her life.

== Tragedy ==
During her lifetime, Emma R. Steiner had to experience a series of life-altering events. A 1902 warehouse fire in New York destroyed many of her works, including the only remaining copy of her first opera Aminaide. In 1909, she filed a lawsuit after the death of her father, who had remarried after her mother's death and had written Steiner out of his will in preference to his stepdaughter. She tried to revoke the ruling by taking the will to court, but in the end she lost and was left with nothing from her father's inheritance.

== Legacy ==
During her career, Steiner conducted more than 6,000 (some say 7,000) performances of operas, operettas, and other works including a number of her own. She wrote hundreds of musical pieces, including seven operas. In addition to her original works she is credited along with Caroline B. Nichols as being among the first women in the United States to make a successful career out of conducting musical performances.

== Selected works ==
=== Operas/Operettas ===
- Aminaide
- 1877: Fleurette
- 1894: Day Dream (based on Alfred Tenneyson's "Sleeping Beauty")
- 1894: Brigands
- 1894: La belle Marguerite
- 1900: The man from Paris (libretto by James A. Russell, modeled on the likeness of the novel by J. W. Castle and M. I. MacDonald)
- 1907/8: Burra Pundit
- The Little Hussar
- The Viking
- The Sleeping Beauty
- The Alchemist
- A Flower Divinely Fair
- Amorita

=== Orchestral ===
- The Flag – Forever May It Wave
