= Ida Divinoff =

American classical violinist

Ida Divinoff (3 Mar 1889 – 20 September 1972) was an American classical violinist and the first woman violinist to play on a major American symphony orchestra. She often performed with her pianist sister Sarah Divinoff.

== Biography ==
Ida Divinoff, born Ida Cohn, was born into a musical Jewish family in Milwaukee, Wisconsin. Her parents were Nathan and Rosa Cohn, immigrants from Eastern Europe. Ida's father was a musician, her sister Sarah Divinoff-Kellner, older than her by three years, often accompanied her on piano, another sister Clara was a music instructor and her brother Harold was a professional musician. She was performing by 1905 and at that time was reported to have been a pupil of Eugène Ysaÿe. Sometime between 1905 and 1913 she travelled to Europe and studied under Otakar Ševčík. She also received lessons from Leopold Auer. By 1913 she adopted the name Ida Divinoff and was often reported as being Russian or European born. She returned to the United States by 1913 and toured the country with John McCormack, the Irish tenor. She performed in New York City in June 1914 to a rave review in the Brooklyn Daily Eagle. She toured the country in 1914 with Orpheum, a burlesque show. She joined the Detroit Symphony Orchestra in December 1918, which was then directed by Ossip Gabrilowitsch.

In her 70s, Ida continued to perform as a member of Chicago's City Symphony Orchestra, an orchestra composed of senior citizens.

Ida married Harry Rothberg, a sign painter, in Detroit, Michigan, in March 1921. After her sister's Sarah's passing, she married her sister's husband, the artist Charles H. Kellner. Ida died 20 September 1972 in Chicago.
