= Patricia Adkins Chiti =

- Born: Patricia Adkins; England
- Died: 12 June 2018; Italy
- Occupations: mezzo-soprano, musicologist, advocate for women in classical music
- Known for: Fondazione Adkins Chiti: Donne in Musica
- Spouse: Gian Paolo Chiti
- Awards: Rosario Marciano Musical Research Award

Patricia Adkins Chiti (died 12 June 2018) was a British-Italian mezzo-soprano, musicologist, and advocate for women in classical music. She founded Donne in Musica ('Women in Music') in 1978, which became Fondazione Adkins Chiti: Donne in Musica ('The Adkins Chiti Foundation: Women in Music') in 1996. She was recognised by Women in Music Uniting Strategies for Talent (WIMUST) for her work, and received numerous prizes and awards, including the Rosario Marciano Musical Research Award.

== Biography ==
Born Patricia Adkins in England, she performed in public from childhood. She completed her studies at the Guildhall School of Music and Drama in London and the Teatro dell'Opera in Rome, where she made her operatic debut in 1972.

From 1980, Adkins Chiti conducted festivals, concert series and symposiums in Italy and abroad, and worked as an expert in cultural policy with governments and universities in Europe, USA and Asia. She was a member of the Italian Commission for Equal Opportunities, and in March 1998, by invitation from the Director General of UNESCO, she presented a series of proposals in favour of women at the World Intergovernmental Conference for Cultural Policies for Development in Stockholm.

Chiti wrote and published academic books and more than 500 articles on the history of women in music, and edited publications about the Baroque period and music of the 18th century. She wrote 40 books and about 800 scholarly articles on female composers and other musical cultural creators, and about the history of singers and musical families for publishers in Italy, Europe, Asia, the United States and Latin America and prepared editions musical reviews of works by women in Italy and the United States. In her later years, her activities included the production of an opera for the International Mozart celebrations in Vienna, the publication of academic volumes, including a book on the history of women in jazz, and a history of women in the Mediterranean region.

Beginning in 2000, she collected second-hand music, books and CDs, and sent them to many parts of the world, especially to Africa, Latin America and Eastern Europe. In 2012, she supervised the collection of materials for the Conservatory in L'Aquila after the earthquake there.

In 2004, the President of Italy honoured her with the Order of Merit of the Italian Republic.

She died on 12 June 2018.

== Fondazione Adkins Chiti: Donne in Musica ==
Adkins Chiti founded the non-governmental organisation Donne in Musica ('Women in Music') in 1978, to promote women's musical creativity. This organisation grew into the Fondazione Adkins Chiti: Donne in Musica, established in 1996, a member organisation of the UNESCO International Music Council and European Music Council.

As of 2015, the foundation had a membership of 41,000 female composers and musicians from 109 countries. The foundation's library and archive contains over 43,000 scores by female composers from different periods, encyclopaedias, books and databases, and a digital Encyclopaedia of Living European Women Composers, Songwriters and Creators of Music. The foundation has published more than 50 books on the history of women as composers, in English, Italian and Arabic.

The foundation has sponsored the European Union's Women in Music Uniting Strategies for Talent (WIMUST) programme, which works to address gender-based discrimination and inequalities for women in music.

== Personal life ==
Adkins was married to Italian composer Gian Paolo Chiti from the 1960s. She spoke English, Italian, French and German; in 2012 she was said to be studying Arabic.

== Selected bibliography ==
- 'Donne in musica' Patricia Adkins Chiti. EAN: 2560007355544, 1982
- 'Almanacco delle virtuose, primedonne, compositrici e musiciste d'Italia dall' A.D. 177 ai giorni nostri.' ('...looks at women musicians through the ages from approx. 1500 up until the present') Chiti, Patricia Adkins. ISBN 8840292322 / ISBN 9788840292328, 1991
- 'Una voce poco fa. Le musiche delle prime donne rossiniane' Adkins Chiti, Patricia, ISBN 8886180004 / ISBN 9788886180009, 1992
- Italian Art Songs of the Romantic Era (songs by Rossini, Donizetti and others, from the private collection of the editor) Chiti, Patricia Adkins (editor)/ Paton, John Glenn (con) ISBN 0739002465 / ISBN 9780739002469, 1994
- 'Donne in musica (Donne del terzo millennio)' (Italian Edition) Patricia Adkins Chiti ISBN 8871445937 / ISBN 9788871445939, 1996
- Songs and Duets of Garcia, Malibran and Viardot: Rediscovered Songs by Legendary Singers: Low (Alfred Vocal Masterworks Series) Patricia Adkins Chiti (Editor), John Glenn Paton (Contributor) ISBN 0882847864 / ISBN 9780882847863, 1997
- Jamila and the others: La storia della musica delle Donne nel Mediterraneo dalla civiltà Sumerica fino a tardo Medioevo. Adkins Chiti, Patricia and Domenico Carboni, 2008. Arabic version by Alma Salem (Syria). Fondazione Adkins Chiti: Donne in Musica. Roma: Edizione Colombo.
- 'Immigrant Musicians in an Urban Context' in: 'Music in Motion', Pub. Kultur und soziale Praxis/ European Music Council, 27 April 2009 doi:10.14361/9783839410745 Ed. Bernd Clausen, Ursula Hemetek, Eva Sæther

== Selected recordings ==
- Donne In Musica Gian Paolo Chiti, Patricia Adkins Chiti • Edizioni Musicali Edi-Pan – PAN NRC 5016 ca. 1980
- The Forgotten Europe (works by Bartók, Szymanowski & Shostakovich) including songs by Shostakovich to poems by Marina Tsvetaeva. Bogdan Czapiewski, Alfred Walter, Orchestre Symphonique de la RTBF & Patricia Adkins-Chiti 1985
- Tsippi Fleischer: song cycle Girl-Butterfly-Girl on Israel at 50: A Celebration with Music of Tsippi Fleischer (1998/9)
- The Music of the Primadonnas Patricia Adkins Chiti, Gianpaolo Chiti, 2011 (rec. 1985) • 14 songs • Kicco Music, LP K-6370 4
- Desolation and Despair (Italian Drawing Room Music of the Romantic Era) Patricia Adkins Chiti, Hiroko Sato, 2011 (Originally released April 1998) • 13 songs • Kicco Music
- Collana musica sinfonica e strumentale: Sinfonie e arie da opere Patricia Adkins Chiti, Saint Paul's Philharmonic Orchestra, Silvano Frontalini, 2014

== See also ==
- Women in classical music
