= Michel de La Guerre =

French organist and composer

Michel de La Guerre (c. 1605 – 1679) was a French organist and composer. His Triomphe de l'Amour sur les Bergers et les Bergères, with librettist Charles de Beys which was first sung in 1655, and staged in 1657, is one of the earliest French operas. After his death his son Marin de la Guerre succeeded him as organist and married Élisabeth Jacquet in 1684.
