= International Alliance for Women in Music =

The International Alliance for Women in Music (IAWM) is an international membership organization of women and men dedicated to fostering and encouraging the activities of women in music, particularly in the areas of musical activity, such as composing, performing, and research, in which gender discrimination is a historic and ongoing concern. In the U.S. the organization operates as a 501(c)3 non-profit. The IAWM engages in efforts to increase the programming of music by female composers, to combat discrimination against female musicians, including as symphony orchestra members, and to include accounts of the contributions of women musicians in university music curricula and textbooks.

The Journal of the IAWM, published in four issues per year, includes research about women in music, continuing the tradition of the AWC News/Forum and the ILWC Journal. The Journal of the IAWM is a first hand resource on information of women composers and has been cited as such on research articles concerning women composers. Another journal founded by the IAWM, Women & Music: A Journal of Gender and Culture," is now edited and published by the University of Nebraska Press.

IAWM Congresses feature compositions, performances, and research papers about women in music. IAWM members have been active in broadening the music curriculum at colleges and universities, by offering courses dedicated to the roles of women in music. Advocacy by the International Alliance for Women in Music has contributed to the inclusion of women composers in college music history textbooks. In another effort toward ending gender discrimination, the IAWM led successful boycotts of the American concerts of the Vienna Philharmonic Orchestra in the 1990s.

The IAWM plays an important role in the careers of many women composers.

== Sponsored awards ==
IAWM sponsors several awards to recognize composers and scholars. What was a single award annually has developed into several distinct categories based on genre or composer identity. The organization's Search for New Music encompasses all of these awards. Notable composers who have received IAWM new music awards include Jennifer Higdon, Andrea Clearfield, Cynthia Folio, Mary Jane Leach, Victoria Bond, Anne LeBaron, Nina C. Young, Paula Matthusen, Li Yiding, Dorothy Chang, Stacy Garrop, Jeeyoung Kim, HyeKyung Lee, and Patricia Morehead.

The Ruth Anderson Commission Prize is awarded to a new sound installation with electro-acoustic music.

The Christine Clark/Theodore Front Prize is for a large chamber or orchestral work and may include voice.

The Miriam Gideon Prize (sponsored by composer Patsy Rogers) is for a vocal work with 1-5 instruments by a composer at least 50 years of age.

The Libby Larsen Prize is for a work in any genre by a composer who is currently enrolled in school.

The Pauline Oliveros New Genre Prize is for works incorporating innovative form or style, such as improvisation, multimedia, use of non-traditional notation, open instrumentation, or new performance practices.

The PatsyLu Prize is for classical art music in any form by women of color and/or lesbians.

The Portland Jazz Composers Ensemble Prize is for a jazz composition of any duration for small ensemble to big band (4-17 instruments).

The Alex Shapiro Prize is for a large wind ensemble composition.

The Judith Lang Zaimont Prize is for an extended instrumental composition—large solo or chamber works—by a composer at least 30 years old whose music has not yet been recorded or published.

The Pauline Alderman Awards were initiated in 1985 by the International Congress on Women in Music to honor the pioneering musicologist Pauline Alderman. They are awarded biannually and recognize the authors of books, articles, reference materials and other publications for their excellence in scholarship about women in music. Winners of the 2017 awards include Laurel Parsons and Brenda Ravenscroft (Book Prize); Gurminder Kaul Bhogal (Article Prize).

== See also ==
- Women in music
- Women's music
- Women in classical music

== History ==
The IAWM was formed in 1995 from the merger of three organizations that arose during the women’s rights movements of the 1970s to combat inequitable treatment of women in music: (1) the International League of Women Composers (ILWC), founded in 1975 by Nancy Van de Vate to create and expand opportunities for women composers of music; (2) the International Congress on Women in Music (ICWM), founded in 1979 by Jeannie Pool to form an organizational basis for women-in-music conferences and meetings; and (3) American Women Composers (AWC), Inc., founded in 1976 by Tommie Ewart Carl to promote music by women composers. AWC created a library of music scores at George Washington University, published a journal, the AWC News/Forum, and produced concerts and recordings of music by American women.

== Current activities ==
Through the efforts of its approximately 400 members, the IAWM continues the work of its parent organizations to achieve its cultural and educational mission of gender equity. The IAWM sponsors an annual Search for New Music by women. Prizes are offered in a number of categories, and the IAWM presents the winning pieces in public concert. The IAWM also sponsors the Pauline Alderman Award for musicological and journalistic works on women in music.
