= Kapralova Society Journal =

Academic journal on women in music

The Kapralova Society Journal
- Discipline: Women's studies, Music
- Language: English

Publication details
- Former name(s): Kapralova Society Newsletter
- History: 2003–present
- Publisher: Kapralova Society (Canada)
- Frequency: Biannually
- Open access: Yes

Standard abbreviations
- ISO 4: Kapralova Soc. J.

Indexing
- ISSN: 1715-4146

Links
- Journal homepage

Kapralova Society Journal is an open-access, scholarly journal dedicated to promoting women in music. It has been published since 2003 by the Kapralova Society, a non-profit publisher and music society founded in 1998 in Toronto, Canada, whose mission is "to promote the music of Czech composer Vítězslava Kaprálová (1915–1940) and to build awareness of women's contributions to musical life." The journal is published annually (until 2025 biannually) and features analytical essays, articles on women composers, music scores, women's music festival reports, CD and book reviews, interviews with women musicians, and announcements of international projects, symposia, and conferences on the subject of women in music.

In 2021, a selection of the journal articles was published in The Women in Music Anthology.

== Selected articles ==
- Edgar, Jessica (2022). "Alone, Together: the Dis/embodied Soprano Voice in Oxbridge Chapel Choirs" (PDF). Kapralova Society Journal. 20 (2): 13–15.
- Ege, Samantha (2018). "Florence Price and the Politics of her Existence" (PDF). Kapralova Society Journal. 16 (1): 1–10.
- Gates, Eugene (2006). "The Woman Composer Question: Philosophical and Historical Perspectives" (PDF). Kapralova Society Journal. 4 (2): 1–11.
- Sémerjian, Ludwig (2019). "Clara Schumann: New Cadenzas for Mozart's Piano Concerto in D Minor. Romantic Visions of a Classical Masterpiece" (PDF). Kapralova Society Journal. 17 (2): 1–9.
