= Céphale et Procris (Jacquet de La Guerre) =

Céphale et Procris (Cephalus and Procris) is an opera by the French composer Élisabeth Jacquet de La Guerre. It takes the form of a tragédie en musique in five acts with an allegorical prologue. The libretto, by Joseph-François Duché de Vancy, is loosely based on the myth of Cephalus and Procris as told in Ovid's Metamorphoses. The opera was first performed by the Paris Opera at the Théâtre du Palais-Royal on 17 March 1694.

Unsurprisingly, the music shows the influence of Jean-Baptiste Lully, the founder of the French genre of tragédie en musique, who had died less than a decade before. But Jacquet de La Guerre added original touches of her own to the Lullian formula, such as a quiet conclusion in place of the expected final chorus.

== Performance history ==
Céphale et Procris was not a success and only ran for five or six performances before disappearing from the stage until a revival of interest in the work in the late 20th century. Wanda R. Griffiths, who has edited the opera, has proposed some reasons for this failure: the poor literary quality of the libretto, with its confused plot; and the cultural climate of Paris in the 1690s, which was generally unfavourable to new operas. Parisian audiences looked to King Louis XIV as their arbiter of taste and the king had lost interest in opera, probably under the influence of his religiously conservative wife Madame de Maintenon. At the time, Catholic religious authorities were attacking opera as a "sensuous" form of entertainment. French national morale was also low as the result of a series of military defeats.

== Roles ==
Role	Voice type	Premiere cast, 17 March 1694 (Conductor: – )
Prologue
Flore (Flora)	soprano	
Pan	bass	
Nerée (Nereus)	haute-contre	
Two nymphs	sopranos	
A sea god	haute-contre	
Chorus of Nymphs from Flora's retinue; Fauns and forest divinities; Tritons and sea gods
Main opera
L'Aurore (Aurora)	soprano	
Procris, Erechtheus's daughter, beloved of Cephalus	soprano	
Céphale (Cephalus), in love with Procris	haute-contre	
Borée, Prince of Thrace, Cephalus's rival	bass	
Erictée (Erechtheus), King of Athens	bass	
Iphis, Nymph, Aurora's confidante	soprano	
Dorine, Procris's confidante	soprano	
Arcas, Cephalus's friend, in love with Dorine	bass	
The priestess of Minerva	soprano	
Two Athenian women	sopranos	
A Thracian man	haute-contre	
A sheperdess	soprano	
A pastor	haute-contre	
La Volupté (Voluptuousness)	soprano	
A lady companion of Voluptuousness	soprano	
La Jalousie (Jealousy)	taille (baritenor)	
La Rage (Rage)	haute-contre	
Le Desespoir (Despair)	bass	
Chorus of Athenian men and women; Thracians from Boreas's retinue; shepherds and shepherdesses; Loves, Players and attendants to Voluptuousness; Zephyr Gods; demons

== Synopsis ==
The opera begins with a prologue celebrating the glory of King Louis XIV. The main opera (Acts I to V) is set in Athens. Céphale, a warrior, and Procris, the daughter of the King of Athens, are in love but are yet to be married (in this the opera differs from Ovid where they are already man and wife). Borée, Prince of Thrace, is Céphale's rival for Procris's hand and the gods help him press his claim, particularly L'Aurore (Aurora, the goddess of dawn) who is in love with Céphale and wants him for herself. When L'Aurore believes Céphale has rejected her, she conjures up demons to cast a spell so Procris will believe Céphale has been unfaithful to her. The spell works but the goddess has a sudden change of heart and convinces Procris that Céphale has always been true to her. Procris finds Céphale and Borée engaged in a fight. When she tries to intervene, Céphale accidentally wounds her with an arrow, and she dies leaving her lover grief-stricken.

== Recording ==
- Céphale et Procris, Soloists, Musica Fiorita, conducted by Daniela Dolci (ORF Alte Edition, 2008, 2 CDs)
- Céphale et Procris, Soloists, Chœur de Chambre de Namur, A nocte temporis, conducted by Reinoud Van Mechelen, 2 CDs CVS 2024. Diapason d’or.

== Sources ==
- Period libretto (according to Paris's copy), in Recueil des Opera, des Ballets, & des plus belles Pièces en Musique, qui ont été représentées depuis dix ou douze ans jusques à présent devant sa Majesté très Chrestienne, Volume V, Amsterdam, Schelte, 1700 (accessible for free online at Google Books)
- Original printed score: Cephale et Procris, Tragédie mise en Musique par Mademoiselle De La Guerre, Paris, Ballard, 1694: Scores at the International Music Score Library Project or at Gallica - B.N.F.
- Modern libretto (with English translation) and score: Jacquet de La Guerre, Elisabeth-Claude, Cephale et Procris (edited by Wanda R. Griffiths), Madison, A-R Editions, 1998
