= Marion Osgood =

American musician (born 1859)

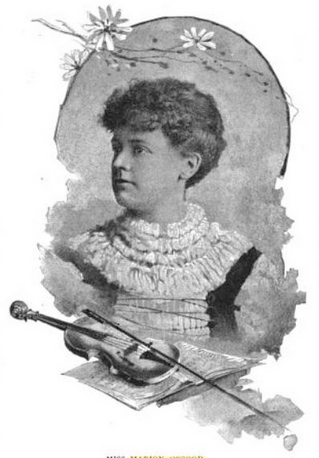

Background information
- Born: Marion Gilman Osgood; January 4, 1859; Chelsea, Massachusetts, United States
- Died: November 1, 1957
- Genres: Classical
- Occupations: Violinist, composer, conductor
- Instrument: Violin
- Formerly of: Marion Osgood's Ladies Orchestra

Marion Gilman Osgood (January 4, 1859 – November 1, 1957) (Note: See "Miss Marion G. Osgood.") was an American violinist, composer, and orchestra conductor. She established her own company, the Marion Osgood's Ladies Orchestra, which was the first women's orchestra organized for professional work in the United States. She was one of the leading solo violinists in the country.

== Biography ==
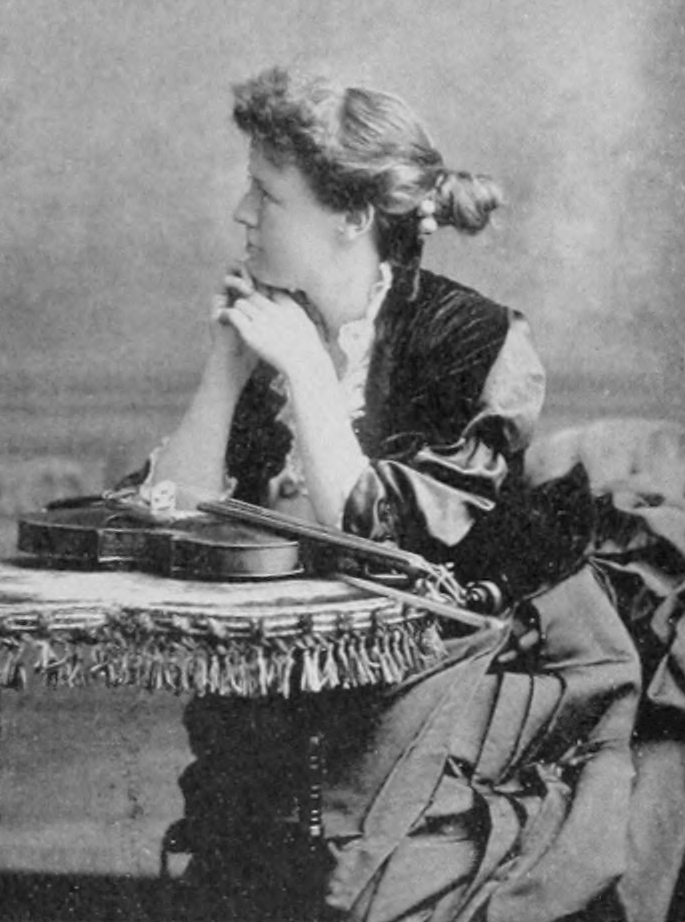
Osgood with violin

Marion G. Osgood was born in Chelsea, Massachusetts. Her father was associated as a teacher with Lowell Mason, and her mother, Mary A. Osgood, was an author and music composer. George L. Osgood, a Boston musician, was her cousin, and her brother was Professor Fletcher Osgood, elocutionist. She began her musical life as a child, coming from a musical and scholarly family.

Osgood worked as a violin teacher in Boston and was one of the leading solo violinists in the US. She composed and published a number of vocal and instrumental pieces, was a scholarly writer regarding art, and met with local success as a writer of short stories in romantic fiction. Osgood organized and conducted the ladies' orchestra which bore her name. This company was established by her in 1884, was composed wholly of women artists, numbered 30 pieces, and was thoroughly organized with brass and woodwinds, strings, and tympana. This company was the first ladies' orchestra for professional work in the US; it existed for about ten years. Among her many published works are a "Fantaisie Caprice", an album of descriptive pieces for violin and piano, and the song "Loving and Loved".

Osgood's correspondence with her publisher, the Arthur P Schmidt Music Company, continues into the year 1951, when she was already in her nineties.
