= Élisabeth Jacquet de La Guerre =

French musician, harpsichordist and composer

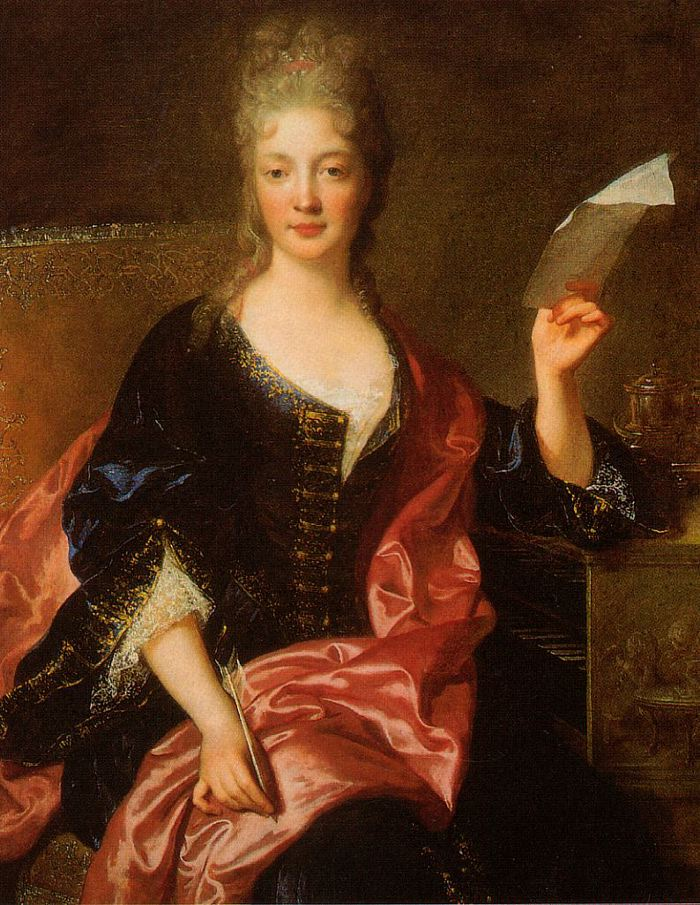
- de La Guerre by François de Troy
- Born: 17 March 1665
- Died: 27 June 1729 (aged 64); Paris

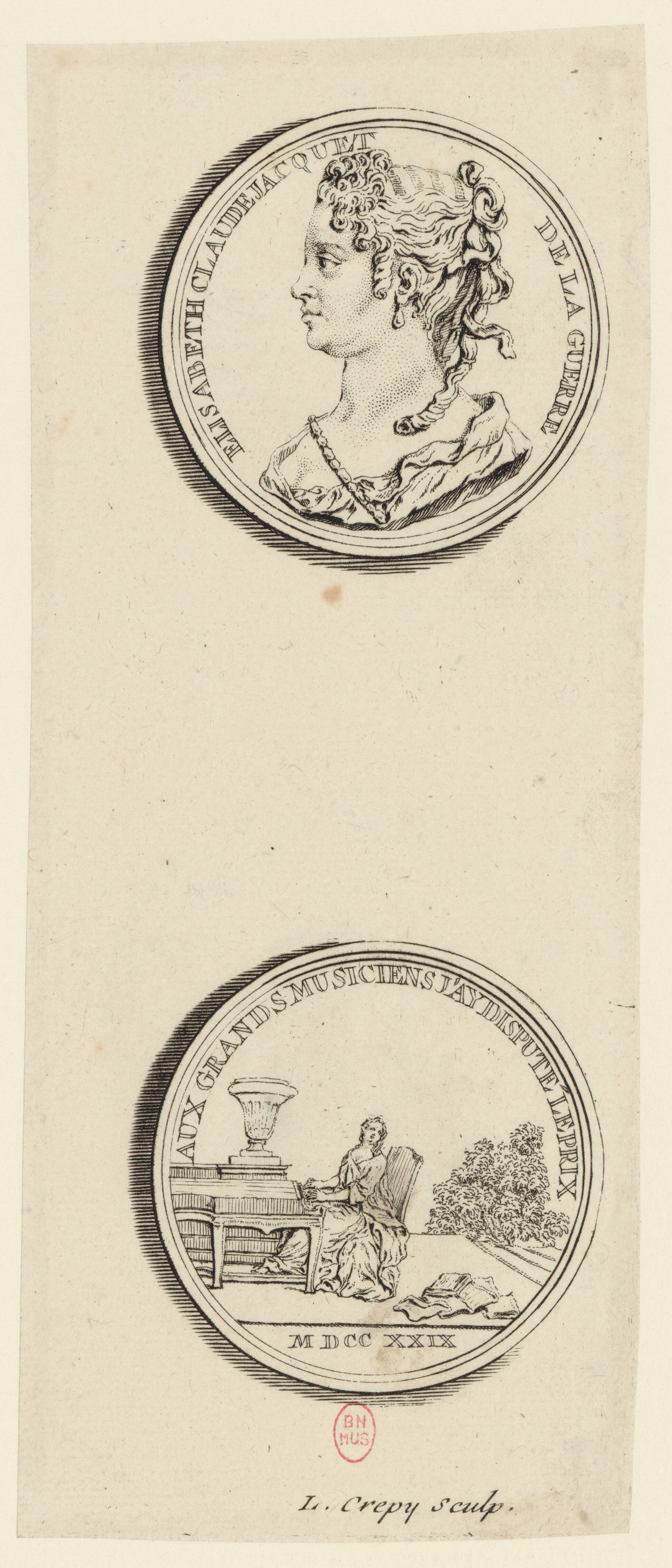
These medalions were part of a project celebrating important French musicians. Titon du Tillet's Le Parnasse francois.

Élisabeth Claude Jacquet de La Guerre (née Jacquet, 17 March 1665 – 27 June 1729) was a French musician, harpsichordist and composer. Jacquet de La Guerre was a significant figure in French Baroque music, particularly in the development of cantata and keyboard traditions. She was one of the earliest women in France to achieve recognition as a composer and to have her works widely performed and published. She was among the first French composers to write cantatas, helping establish the genre in France. She was closely associated with the court of Louis XIV, where her career was shaped by royal patronage and the musical culture of Versailles. Her music blends French stylistic traditions with elements of Italian influence, particularly in her vocal and instrumental works.

== Life and works ==
Élisabeth-Claude Jacquet was born on March 17, 1665, into a family of musicians and master instrument-makers in the parish of Saint-Louis-en-l'Île, Paris. Her grandfather, Jehan Jacquet, and her father, Claude Jacquet, were harpsichord makers. Claude taught his sons and daughters how to survive and thrive in the world. Élisabeth received her initial musical education from her father. When she was five, Louis XIV, the "Sun King," took notice of her when she performed at his palace of Versailles. This eventually led to her becoming a musician in his court. She wrote most of her works under his patronage. As a teenager she was accepted into the French court, where her education was supervised by the king's mistress, Françoise-Athénaïs, marquise de Montespan. She stayed with the royal court until it moved to Versailles. In 1684, she married the organist Marin de La Guerre, son of the late organist at the Sainte-Chapelle, Michel de La Guerre. After her marriage she taught, composed and gave concerts at home and throughout Paris to great acclaim.

Jacquet de La Guerre was one of the few well-known female composers of her time, and unlike many of her contemporaries she composed in a wide variety of forms. Her talent and achievements were acknowledged by Titon du Tillet, who accorded her a place on his Mount Parnassus when she was only 26 years old, next to Lalande and Marais and immediately below Lully. A quote from Titon du Tillet describes her as having:

marvellous facility for playing preludes and fantasies off the cuff. Sometimes she improvises one or another for a whole half hour with tunes and harmonies of great variety and in quite the best possible taste, quite charming her listeners. (Le Parnasse françois, 1732)

Her first published work was her Premier livre de pièces de clavessin, printed in 1687, which includes unmeasured preludes. It was one of the few collections of harpsichord pieces printed in France in the 17th century, along with those of Chambonnières, Lebègue and d'Anglebert. During the 1690s she composed a ballet, Les Jeux à l'honneur de la victoire (c. 1691), which has subsequently been lost. On 15 March 1694, the production of her opera Céphale et Procris at the Académie Royale de Musique was the first of an opera written by a woman in France. The five-act tragédie lyrique was set to a libretto by Duché de Vancy. Like her contemporaries, she also experimented with Italian genres: principally the sonata and the cantata. In 1695 she composed a set of trio sonatas which, with those of Marc-Antoine Charpentier, François Couperin, Jean-Féry Rebel and Sébastien de Brossard, are among the earliest French examples of the sonata.

Her only published opera received 5 or 6 performances. An explanation of this failure was that the opera depended on the text rather than the music. Céphale et Procris was soon known as tragédie en musique, a tragedy put into music, and French literary theatre recited musically. Her operatic compositions were not received well by the French musical culture, which was cautious about contemporary opera. They might have been accepted more readily in Italy with all its musical innovations, but in France, operatic tradition was considered necessary. The reception of Céphale et Procris tells us more about the world of opera in France in the 1690s and French music than about her ability as a composer. This put a stop to her career as an operatic composer.

During the next few years many of her near relations died, including her only son who was ten years old, her mother, father, husband, and brother Nicolas. She continued to perform, however, and in 1707 her collection Pièces de Clavecin qui peuvent se jouer sur le Violon, a new set of harpsichord pieces, was published, followed by six Sonates pour le violon et pour le clavecin. These works are an early example of the then-new genre of accompanied harpsichord works, where the instrument is used in an obbligato role with the violin; Rameau's Pièces de clavecin en concerts are somewhat of the same type. The dedication of the 1707 work speaks of the continuing admiration and patronage of Louis XIV:

Such happiness for me, Sire, if my latest work may receive as glorious a reception from Your Majesty as I have enjoyed almost from the cradle, for, Sire, if I may remind you, you never spurned my youthful offerings. You took pleasure in seeing the birth of the talent that I have devoted to you; and you honoured me even then with your commendations, of the value of which I had no understanding at the time. My slender talents have since grown. I have striven even harder, Sire, to deserve your approbation, which has always meant everything to me ...

She returned to vocal composition with the publication of two books of Cantates françaises sur des sujets tirez de l'Ecriture, Book 1 (1708) and Book 2 (1711). Also known as the Cantates Bibliques Her last published work was a collection of secular Cantates Françoises (c. 1715). In the inventory of her possessions after her death, there were three harpsichords: a small one with white and black keys, one with black keys, and a large double manual Flemish harpsichord.

Jacquet de La Guerre died in Paris in 1729.

== Reception ==
Despite the poor reception of her opera, she continued to publish her work and take opportunities. Her sonatas, from later in her life, are considered triumphs of the genre. This is due to her development of the role for violin and the way she blended French traditions with Italian innovations. After her death, her genius in compositions, her creativity in vocal and instrumental music, and the variety of the genres in which she worked were acknowledged. Her life and career success show that she was given a rare opportunity to succeed as a female composer, and that she took full advantage of it.

During the 1990s there was a renewed interest in her compositions and a number have been recorded.

In 2023, the Dunedin Consort, with Hera and Mahogany Opera, performed the Cantates Bibliques for the first time in 300 years under the title Out of Her Mouth, in Scotland, York and London, music 'written by a woman about women and for women'. The mini-operas reflect the struggles of three Biblical women—Susanne, Rachel and Judith—against male violence and oppression and their staging included 'three different singers, four musicians, five watermelons and seven large blue rolls'.

== List of works ==
Jacquet de La Guerre's early trio sonatas and violin/viola da gamba sonatas survive only in manuscript sources in Paris. The rest of her output is thought to have been published in her lifetime, although Titon du Tillet mentioned a lost Te Deum setting in his tribute to Jacquet de La Guerre.

=== Stage ===
- Les jeux à l'honneur de la victoire (ballet, c. 1691), lost
- Céphale et Procris (tragédie lyrique, 1694)

=== Vocal music ===
- Cantates françaises sur des sujets tirez de l'Ecriture, livre I (Paris, 1708) (Note: Also known as Cantates Bibliques)
  - Esther
  - Le passage de la Mer rouge
  - Jacob et Rachel
  - Jonas
  - Suzanne et les vieillards
  - Judith
- Cantates françaises sur des sujets tirez de l'Ecriture, livre II (Paris, 1711)
  - Adam
  - Le temple rebasti
  - Le deluge
  - Joseph
  - Jepthe
  - Sampson
- La musette, ou Les bergers de Suresne (Paris, 1713)
- Cantates Françoises (Paris, c.1715 [3 cantatas; 1 comic duet])
  - Semelé
  - L'Ile de Delos
  - Le Sommeil d'Ulisse
  - Le Raccommodement Comique de Pierrot et de Nicole
- Te Deum (1721, lost)
- Various songs published in Recueil d'airs sérieux et à boire (1710–24)

=== Instrumental ===
- Les pièces de clavessin, livre I (Paris, 1687)
  - Suite in D minor: Prelude / Allemande / Courante / 2d Courante / Sarabande / Gigue / Cannaris / Chaconne l'Inconstante / Menuet
  - Suite in G minor: Prelude / Allemande / Courante / 2d Courante / Sarabande / Gigue / 2d Gigue / Menuet
  - Suite in A minor: Prelude / Allemande / Courante / 2d Courante / Sarabande / Gigue / Chaconne / Gavott / Menuet
  - Suite in F major: Tocade / Allemande / Courante / 2d Courante / Sarabande / Gigue / Cannaris / Menuet
- Les pièces de clavecin, livre II (Paris, 1707)
  - Suite in D minor: La Flamande / Double / Courante / Double / Sarabande / Gigue / Double / 2d Gigue / Rigadoun / 2d Rigadoun / Chaconne
  - Suite in G major: Allemande / Courante / Sarabande / Gigue / Menuet / Rondeau
- Sonatas [6], violin and clavecin (Paris [chez l'auteur, Foucault, Ribou, Ballard], 1707)
  - Sonata [no. 1] in D minor: Grave / Presto / Adagio / Presto-Adagio / Presto / Aria / Presto
  - Sonata [no. 2] in D major: Grave / Allegro / Aria (Affettusos) / Sarabande / Gavotte (Allegro) / Presto
  - Sonata [no. 3] in F major: Grave / Presto-Adagio / Presto / Aria / Adagio
  - Sonata [no. 4] in G major: [Grave]-Presto-Adagio / Presto-Adagio / Presto-Adagio / Aria
  - Sonata [no. 5] in A minor: Grave / Presto / Adagio-Courante-Reprise / Aria
  - Sonata [no. 6] in A major: Allemande / Presto / Adagio / Aria / Adagio / Presto-Adagio / Aria
- Trio Sonatas [4], violin, viola da gamba, and basso continuo (c.1695)

== See also ==
- List of French harpsichordists
