= List of compositions by Florence Price =

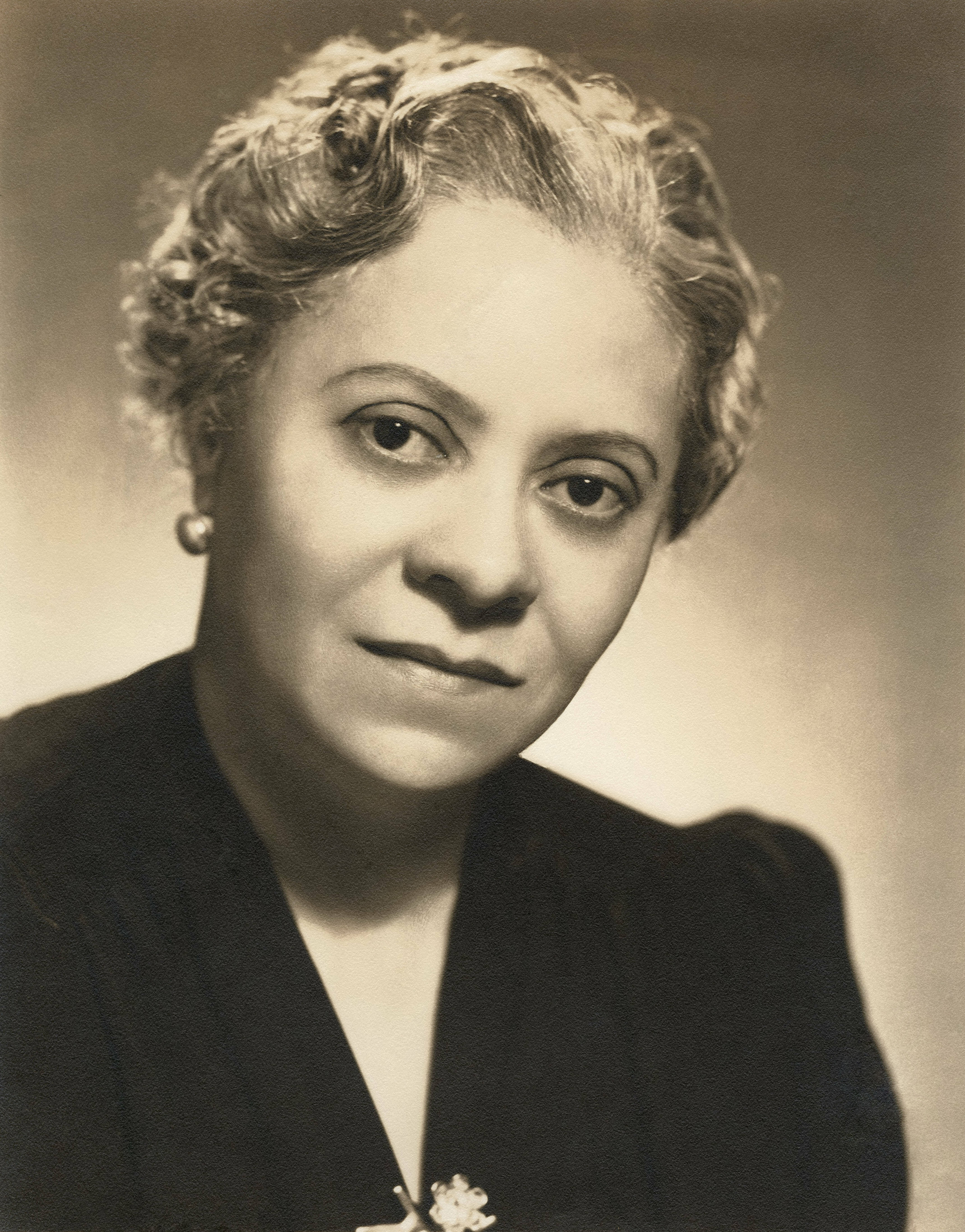
Price, date unknown

This is a list of compositions by Florence Beatrice Price (1887/88 – 1953). During her life, she composed over 300 works.

== Symphonies ==
- Symphony (1906), unpublished, lost
- Symphony No. 1 in E minor (1931–33); First Prize in the Rodman Wanamaker Competition, 1932
- Symphony No. 2 in G minor (c. 1935, presumed lost)
- Symphony No. 3 in C minor (1938–40)
- Symphony No. 4 in D minor (1945)

== Concertos ==
- Piano Concerto in D minor (in one movement)
- Violin Concerto No. 1 in D major (1939)
- Violin Concerto No. 2 in D minor (1952)
- Rhapsody/Fantasie for piano and orchestra (date unknown, possibly incomplete)

== Other orchestral works ==
- Ethiopia's Shadow in America (1929–32)
- Mississippi River Suite (1934); although labelled as a "suite", the work is cast in one continuous large-scale movement, in which several famous Mississippi river songs are quoted, such as "Go Down, Moses", "Nobody Knows the Trouble I've Seen" and "Deep River".
- Chicago Suite (date unknown)
- Colonial Dance Symphony (date unknown)
- Concert Overture No. 1 (date unknown); based on the spiritual "Sinner, Please Don't Let This Harvest Pass"
- Concert Overture No. 2 (1943); based on three spirituals ("Go Down, Moses", "Ev'ry Time I Feel the Spirit", "Nobody Knows the Trouble I've Seen")
- The Oak, tone poem (1943);
- Songs of the Oak, tone poem (1943);
- Suite of Negro Dances (performed in 1951; orchestral version of the Three Little Negro Dances for piano, 1933;); also referred to as Suite of Dances
- Suite for Strings, commissioned 1951 by Sir John Barbirolli for the Halle Orchestra and reportedly performed, but lost (or related to Suite of Dances)
- Dances in the Canebrakes (orchestral version of the piano work, 1953)

=== Choral ===
- "The Moon Bridge" (Mary Rolofson Gamble), SSA, pf (1930); in Florence B. Price: Two Moon Songs for Women's Chorus and Piano, ed. John Michael Cooper (Fayetteville, AR: ClarNan Editions, 2025)
- "The New Moon" (Follen), SSAA, pf duet (one kbd, 4 hnds) (1930), in Florence B. Price: Two Moon Songs for Women's Chorus and Piano, ed. John Michael Cooper (Fayetteville, AR: ClarNan Editions, 2025)
- "The Wind and the Sea" (P. L. Dunbar), SSAATTBB, pf, str qt, 1934;
- "Ode to Man" (Curtis W. Reese, Sr), SATB, org, pf (1944)
- "Night" (Bessie Mayle), SSA, pf (1945)
- "Witch of the Meadow" (Gamble), SSA (1947);
- "Sea Gulls", female chorus, fl, cl, vn, va, vc, pf, by 1951;
- "Nature's Magic" (Gamble), SSA (1953);
- "Song for Snow" (E. Coatsworth), SATB (1957);
- "Abraham Lincoln walks at midnight" (V. Lindsay), 2 versions: first version for SATB soli, ch, orch, org (March–June 1939) (New York: G. Schirmer, 2019); revised version for SATB soli, ch, pf (June 1939-December 1941), ed. John Michael Cooper (Fayetteville, AR: ClarNan Editions, 2025)
- "After the 1st and 6th Commandments", SATB;
- "Communion Service", F, SATB, org;
- "Nod" (W. de la Mare), TTBB;
- Resignation (Price), SATB;
- "Song of Hope" (Price);
- "Spring Journey", SSA, str qt

== Solo vocal (art songs and spirituals, all with piano) ==
- "Don't You Tell Me No" (Price) (between 1931 and 1934)
- "Brown Arms (To Mother)" (Owens) (1931 or 1932), in Florence B. Price: Seven Songs on Texts of African American Poets, ed. John Michael Cooper (Fayetteville, AR: ClarNan, 2024).
- "Dreamin' Town" (Dunbar), 1934
- 4 Songs, B-Bar, 1935
- "My Dream" (Hughes), 1935
- Four Negro Songs (Dunbar), March 20–21, 1935, in Seven Songs on Texts of African American Poets, ed. John Michael Cooper (Fayetteville, AR: ClarNan, 2024). 1. Easy-goin', 2. Summah Night, 3. Dat's My Gal, or The Photograph, 4. Goo'-bye, Jinks.
- "Four Songs" from The Weary Blues (Hughes) (April 26, 1935): "My Dream", "Songs to the Dark Virgin", "Ardella", "Dream Ships"." [Note: The Weary Blues here refers to the anthology volume, not the title poem itself.]
- "Dawn's Awakening" (J. J. Burke), 1936;
- "God Gives Me You" (Connelly) (ca. 1937), in Florence B. Price: Seventeen Art Songs and Spirituals, ed. John Michael Cooper (Fayetteville, AR: ClarNan, 2025)
- "Fantasy in Purple" (Hughes) (1940)
- "Life" (Dunbar) (1940) in Florence B. Price: Seventeen Art Songs and Spirituals, ed. John Michael Cooper (Fayetteville, AR: ClarNan, 2025)
- "After the Winter" (McKay) (1941) in Florence B. Price: Seventeen Art Songs and Spirituals, ed. John Michael Cooper (Fayetteville, AR: ClarNan, 2025)
- "Lethe" (Johnson) (1941) in Florence B. Price: Seventeen Art Songs and Spirituals, ed. John Michael Cooper (Fayetteville, AR: ClarNan, 2025)
- Monologue for the Working Class (Langston Hughes) (October 1941)
- "My Little Dreams (to the memory of my husband) (Johnson) (ca. 1942) in Florence B. Price: Seventeen Art Songs and Spirituals, ed. John Michael Cooper (Fayetteville, AR: ClarNan, 2025)
- "Feet o' Jesus" (Hughes) (1944)
- "Hold Fast to Dreams" (Hughes), 1945
- Lullaby (For a Black Mother) (Hughes) (1945), in Florence B. Price: Seven Songs on Texts of African American Poets, ed. John Michael Cooper (Fayetteville, AR: ClarNan, 2024).
- "Night" (L. C. Wallace) (1946)
- "Out of the South Blew a Wind" (F.C. Woods) (1946)
- "Beyond the Years" (Dunbar) (ca. 1947), in Florence B. Price: Seventeen Art Songs and Spirituals, ed. John Michael Cooper (Fayetteville, AR: ClarNan, 2025)
- My Soul and I" (Tolson) (1947), in Florence B. Price: Seven Songs on Texts of African American Poets, ed. John Michael Cooper (Fayetteville, AR: ClarNan, 2024)
- "Before This Time another Year" (spiritual) (September 1948), in Florence B. Price: Seventeen Art Songs and Spirituals, ed. John Michael Cooper (Fayetteville, AR: ClarNan, 2025)
- "Rhapsody" (Braithwaite) (ca. 1948) in Florence B. Price: Seventeen Art Songs and Spirituals, ed. John Michael Cooper (Fayetteville, AR: ClarNan, 2025)
- "An April Day" (J. F. Cotter) (1949)
- "The Envious Wren" (A. and P. Carey)
- "Forever" (Dunbar) (1939)
- "The Glory of the Day was in her Face" (J. W. Johnson) (1935)
- "The Heart of a Woman" (G. D. Johnson), 1941
- "Love-in-a-Mist" (Gamble) (1930)
- "Nightfall" (Dunbar); "Resignation" (Price), also arr. chorus;
- "Song of the Open Road; Sympathy" (Dunbar);
- "To my Little Son" (J. J. Davis) (1950);
- "Travel's End" (M. F. Hoisington), 1933
- "Judgement Day" (Hughes). (Hughes)
- "Some o' These Days" (ca. 1940)
- about 70 other works

== Instrumental chamber music ==
- String trio (1906) - unpublished, lost
- Andante con espressione (1929)
- String Quartet (No. 1) in G major (1929)
- Fantasie [No. 1] in G minor for Violin and Piano (1933)
- String Quartet (No. 2) in A minor (published in 1935)
- Piano Quintet in E minor (1936)
- Piano Quintet in A minor (1952)
- Five Folksongs in Counterpoint for String Quartet (1950)
- Fantasy [No. 2] in F♯ minor for Violin and Piano (1940)
- Moods, for Flute, Clarinet and Piano (1953)
- Spring Journey, for 2 violins, viola, cello, double bass and piano

== Works for piano ==
- Tarantella (1926)
- Impromptu No. 1 (1926)
- Valsette Mignon (1926)
- Preludes (1926–32): No. 1 Allegro moderato; No. 2 Andantino cantabile; No. 3 Allegro molto; No. 4 ["Wistful"] Allegretto con tenerezza; No. 5 Allegro
- At the Cotton Gin (1927); published by G. Schirmer (New York), 1928
- [Six Descriptive Pieces]: [No. 1] Little Truants (October 7, 1927); No. 2. Two Busy Little Hands; No. 3. Hard Problems (October 9, 1927); [No. 4.] Tittle Tattle; [No. 5] In Romance Land (October 24–25, 1927); [No. 6.] Hilda's Waltz (October 26, 1927).
- Pensive Mood (March 3, 1928)
- Scherzo in G (May 24, 1929 [?])
- Song without Words in G major (No definite date)
- Meditation ([ca. 1929])
- Fantasie nègre [No. 1] (E minor)(1929, as "Negro Fantasy"; rev. 1931); based on the spiritual "Sinner, please don't let this harvest pass" (original version premiered September 3, 1930, by Margaret Bonds at twelfth annual convention of National Association of Negro Musicians, Chicago).
- On a Quiet Lake (June 23, 1929)
- Waltz of the Spring Maid (ca. early 1930s)
- Barcarolle (ca. 1929–32)
- His Dream (ca. 1930–31)
- Cotton Dance (Dance of the Cotton Blossoms) (1931)
- Fantasie nègre No. 2 in G minor (March 1932)
- Fantasie nègre No. 3 in F minor (March 30, 1932)
- Fantasie nègre No. 4 in B minor (April 5, 1932 – [ca. 1937]) (4 versions)
- Song without Words in A major (April 21, 1932)
- Piano Sonata in E minor (1932)
- Child Asleep (July 6, 1932)
- Etude [in C major] [ca. 1932]
- 3 Little Negro Dances (1933): Rabbit Foot, Hoe Cake, Ticklin' Toes. Also arranged for concert band (1939); for two pianos (1949); and for orchestra (before 1951)
- Tecumseh (published by Carl Fischer, New York, 1935)
- Scenes in Tin Can Alley (ca. 1937): "The Huckster" (October 1, 1928), "Children at Play", "Night"
- 3 Sketches for little pianists (1937)
- Arkansas Jitter (1938)
- Bayou Dance (1938)
- Dance of the Cotton Blossoms (1938)
- Summer Moon (for Memry Midgett) (April 6, 1938)
- Down a Southern Lane (April 29, 1939)
- Joy in June (June 27, 1938)
- On a Summer's Eve (June 15, 1939)
- Rocking chair (1939)
- Thumbnail Sketches of a Day in the Life of a Washerwoman (ca. 1938–40). Two versions. First version consists of "Morning", "Dreaming at the Washtub", "A Gay Moment", and "Evening Shadows"; second version omits "Dreaming at the Washtub".
- Rowing: Little Concert Waltz [?1930s].
- [Ten Negro Spirituals for the Piano] [1937–42): Let Us Cheer the Weary Traveler; I'm Troubled in My Mind; I Know the Lord Has Laid His Hands on Me; Joshua Fit de Battle of Jericho; Gimme That Old Time Religion; Swing Low, Sweet Chariot; I Want Jesus to Walk with Me; Peter, Go Ring dem Bells; Were You There When They Crucified My Lord; Lord, I Want to Be a Christian
- An Old Love Letter [ca. 1941].
- Remembrance (1941 or earlier) (to Mr. Henry S. Sawyer)
- Village Scenes (1942): "Church Spires in Moonlight", "A Shaded Lane", "The Park"
- Your Hands in Mine (1943) (originally titled Memory Lane)
- [Four Pieces for Piano Solo]: "Levee at Noontime – Barcarolle" (November 17, 1943); "Little Miss Perky" (November 17, 1943); "Smile, Smile!" (November 17, 1943); "Fairy Fun (or Fairies' Frolic)" [originally titled "Little Toe Dancer"] (November 17, 1943).
- Clouds [ca. 1940s]
- Cotton Dance (Presto) ([ca. 1940s])
- 2 Fantasies on Folk Tunes (date unknown)
- In Sentimental Mood (1947)
- Whim Wham (July 6, 1946)
- Placid Lake (July 17, 1947)
- Memories of Dixieland (1947); won Holstein Award, 1947
- Sketches in Sepia (September 1947)
- Rock-a-bye (1947)
- [Six Piano Pieces] (November 11 and 12, 1947)
- [Three Roses]: To a Yellow Rose, To a White Rose, To a Red Rose (1949)
- To a Brown Leaf (1949)
- First Romance (ca. 1940s)
- Waltzing on a Sunbeam (ca. 1950
- The Goblin and the Mosquito (1951)
- Snapshots (1952): I. Lake Mirror (October 13, 1952), II. Moon behind a Cloud (July 17, 1949), III. Flame (January 14, 1949)
- Until We Meet (1952)
- Dances in the Canebrakes (1953); also orchestrated
- about 70 teaching pieces

Undated:

- I'm Troubled in My Mind
- Pieces to a Certain Pair of Newlyweds [only No. 1]
- Three Miniature Portraits of Uncle Ned (originally "Three Miniature Portraits of Uncle Joe"; later "Two Photographs" (second version performed April 15, 1948)

== Arrangements of spirituals ==
- "My soul's been anchored in de Lord", 1v, pf (1937), arr. 1v, orch, arr. chorus, pf;
- "Nobody knows the trouble I've Seen (Philadelphia: Theodore Presser, 1938);
- "Some o' These Days", arrangement for voice and piano, date uncertain (likely in the late 1930s or early 1940s).
- Two Traditional Negro Spirituals, 1 v, pf (1940): "I Am Bound for the Kingdom" and "I'm Workin' on My Buildin'" Price combined African-American spirituals and dance idioms with classical forms, drawing on call-and-response patterns and juba rhythms.
- "Were you there when they crucified my Lord?", pf (1942);
- "I am bound for the kingdom", 1v, pf (1948);
- "I'm workin' on my building", 1v, pf job at Florida
- "Heav'n bound soldier", male chorus, 1949 [2 arrs.];

Undated:

- "Joshua Fit de Battle of Jericho" (arranged by Price, ca. 1940s–1950)
- "Peter, Go Ring dem Bells" (undated)
- Variations on a Folksong "Peter, go ring dem bells)", org (date uncertain, likely mid-20th century);
- "I couldn't hear nobody pray", SSAATTBB;
- "Save me, Lord, save me", 1v, pf;
- "Trouble done come my way", 1v, pf;
- ?12 other works, 1v, pf
  - Manuscripts of approximately 40 songs in US-PHu (Philadelphia); other manuscripts in private collections and archives at the University of Arkansas and the University of Florida.

== Works for organ ==
- Adoration in The Organ Portfolio vol. 15/86 (December 1951), Dayton OH: Lorenz Publishing Co., 34–35.
- Andante, July 24, 1952
- Andantino con espressione, 1929
- Allegretto
- Cantilena March 10, 1951
- Caprice
- Dainty Lass, by November 19, 1936
- Echoes of a Prayer (by July 14, 1950)
- Festal March
- First Sonata for Organ, 1927
- The Hour Glass [formerly Sandman]. paired with Retrospection as No. 1
- Hour of Peace or Hour of Contentment or Gentle Heart, November 16, 1951
- In Quiet Mood [formerly Evening and then Impromptu], New York: Galaxy Music Corp, 1951 (dated August 7, 1941)
- Little Melody
- Little Pastorale
- Offertory in The Organ Portfolio vol. 17/130 (1953). Dayton OH: Lorenz Publishing Co., 1953
- O Solemn Thought, by July 14, 1950
- Passacaglia and Fugue, January 1927
- A Pleasant Thought, December 10, 1951
- Prelude and Fantasie, by 1942
- Retrospection [formerly An Elf on a Moonbeam], paired with The Hour Glass as No. 2
- Steal Away to Jesus, by November 19, 1936
- Suite No. 1, by April 6, 1942
- Memory Mist (1949)
- Tempo moderato [no title], seriously damaged and possibly incomplete]
- Variations on a Folksong
  - Principal publishers: Fischer, Gamble-Hinged, Handy, McKinley, Presser

== Works for violin (with piano accompaniment) ==
- Andante Con Espressione
- Deserted Garden
- Elfentanz
- Fantasie in G minor for Violin and Piano (1933)
