= Yannick Nézet-Séguin =

Canadian conductor and pianist (born 1975)

Yannick Nézet-Séguin CC
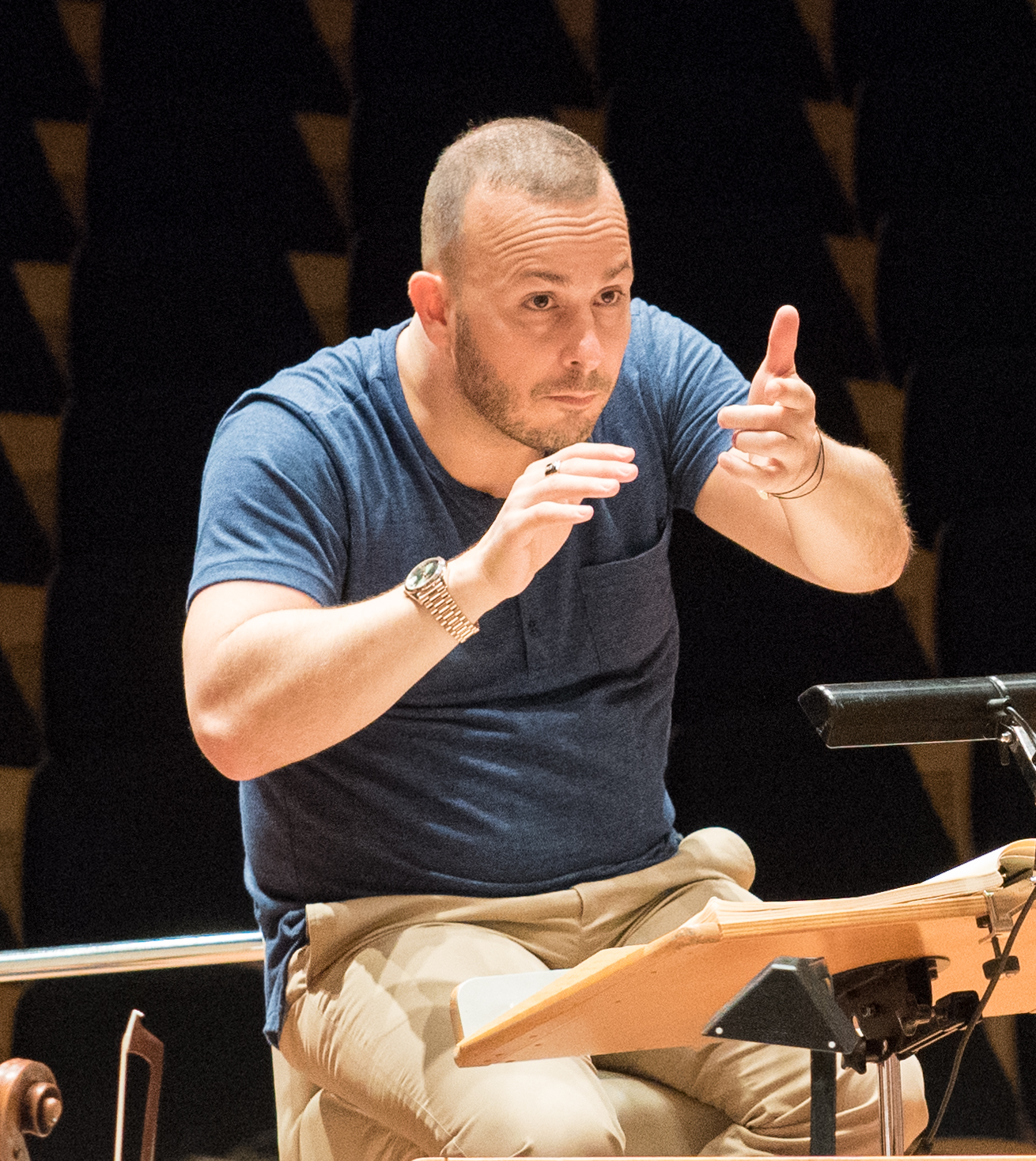
- Nézet-Séguin in 2018
- Born: Yannick Séguin; 6 March 1975 (age 51); Montreal, Quebec, Canada
- Occupations: Conductor, pianist
- Years active: 1994–present
- Spouse: Pierre Tourville
- Yannick Nézet-Séguin's voice During a premature applause after conducting the 3rd movement of Amy Beach's Gaelic Symphony; Recorded March 14, 2026

Yannick Nézet-Séguin, CC (French pronunciation: [ja.nik ne.zɛ se.ɡɛ̃]; born Yannick Séguin; 6 March 1975) is a Canadian conductor and pianist. He is the music director of the Orchestre Métropolitain (Montréal), the Metropolitan Opera (New York City), and the Philadelphia Orchestra. He was the principal conductor of the Rotterdam Philharmonic Orchestra from 2008 to 2018.

== Early life and education ==
Nézet-Séguin was born in Montreal on 6 March 1975 to Serge P. Séguin, a university professor, and Claudine Nézet, a university lecturer and coordinator. He began to study piano at age five, with Jeanne-d'Arc Lebrun-Lussier, and decided to become an orchestra conductor at age ten.

At age twelve, he began studying at the Conservatoire de Musique in Montreal.

At the age of fifteen he added his mother's maiden name, Nézet, to his surname. Séguin is a common name in Quebec, and he has said that a double-barreled name would help him stand out as an artist.

== Career ==
At 19, he met and was invited to follow Carlo Maria Giulini in rehearsals and concerts for more than a year. He became the musical director of the Chœur polyphonique de Montréal in 1994 and obtained the same post at Choeur de Laval in 1995. In 1995, he founded his own professional orchestral and vocal ensemble, La Chapelle de Montréal, with whom he performed two to four concerts a year until 2002. He considers Charles Dutoit as his first inspiration as a child and Carlo Maria Giulini as his master. From 1998 to 2002, Nézet-Séguin was chorus master and assistant conductor of the Opéra de Montréal. Maestro Nézet-Séguin made his American conducting debut in 2002 at Sarasota Opera conducting Mozart's Così fan tutte.

=== Orchestre Métropolitain ===
Nézet-Séguin became music director of the Orchestre Métropolitain (Montréal) in 2000, and principal guest conductor of the Victoria Symphony (British Columbia, Canada) in 2003. His contract with the Orchestre Métropolitain through 2010 was later extended through 2015. In September 2015, the orchestra announced a further extension of his contract through the 2020–21 season. In September 2019, the orchestra announced that Nézet-Séguin had signed for a lifetime contract. He has conducted commercial recordings of symphonies of Anton Bruckner and Gustav Mahler with the Orchestre Métropolitain.

=== Rotterdam Philharmonic Orchestra ===
In 2005, Nézet-Séguin guest-conducted the Rotterdam Philharmonic Orchestra (RPhO) for the first time, and returned in 2006. In December 2006, the RPhO announced the appointment of Nézet-Séguin as their 11th Principal Conductor, by a unanimous vote, starting with the 2008–09 concert season, with an initial contract of 4 years. In April 2010, the RPhO announced the extension of his contract through 2015. With the RPhO, Nézet-Séguin has recorded commercially for Virgin Classics and for EMI. In June 2013, the RPhO further extended his contract through the summer of 2018. In May 2015, the RPhO announced the conclusion of Nézet-Séguin's tenure as RPhO principal conductor at the end of the 2017–2018 season. He now has the title of Eredirigent (honorary conductor) of the RPhO.

=== Philadelphia Orchestra ===
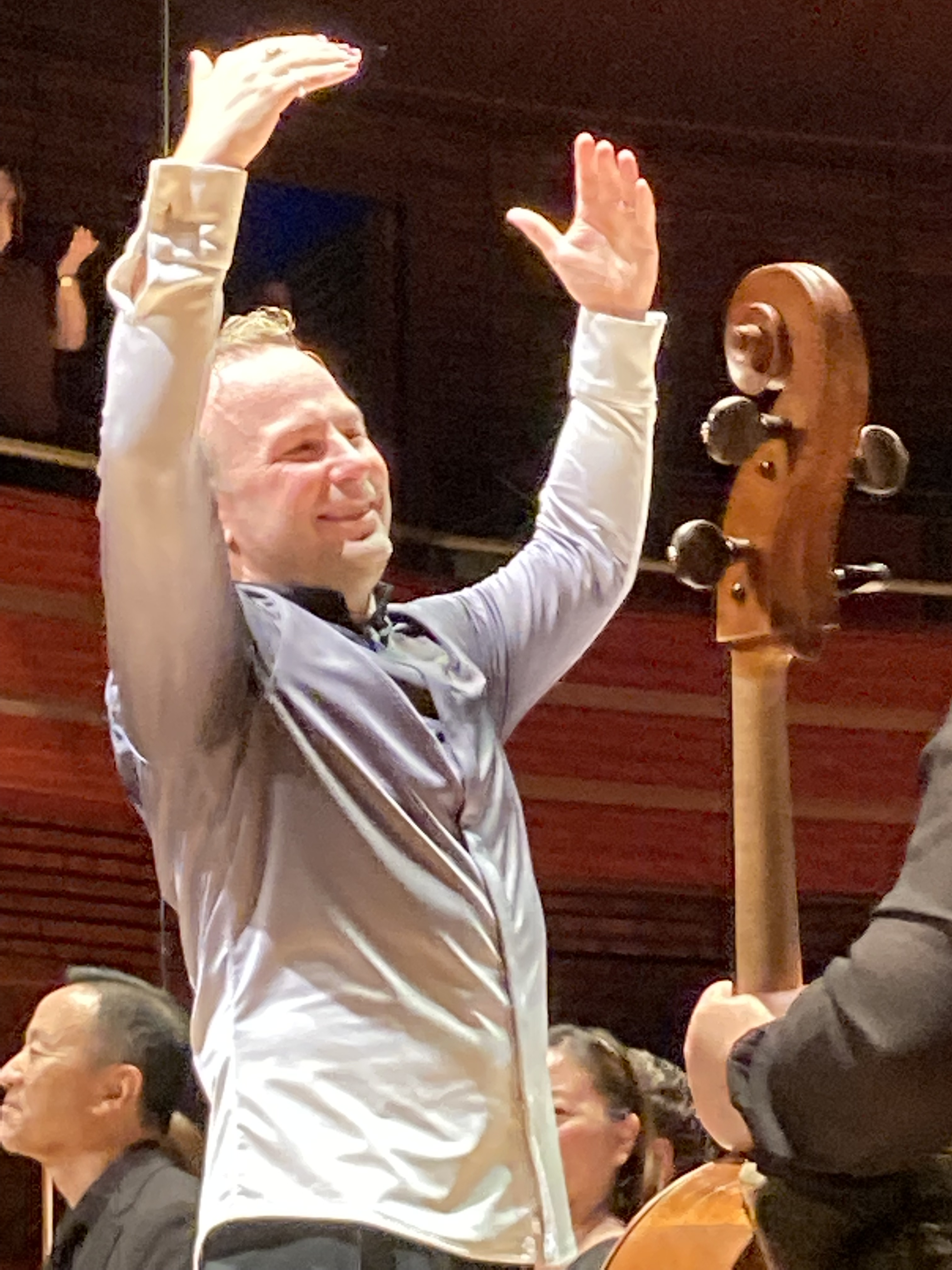
Nézet-Séguin with the Philadelphia Orchestra at the Kimmel Center in 2025

In December 2008, Nézet-Séguin made his first appearance with the Philadelphia Orchestra, at the invitation of Charles Dutoit. He returned for a second guest-conducting engagement in December 2009. In June 2010, he was named the eighth music director of the Philadelphia Orchestra, starting with the 2012–13 season. He served as music director-designate from 2010 to 2012. His initial contract as music director was for 5 seasons, with 7 weeks of scheduled concerts in the 2012–13 season, 15 weeks in the next 2 seasons, and 16 weeks in the subsequent 2 seasons of his Philadelphia contract. In January 2015, the orchestra announced a five-year extension of Nézet-Séguin's contract to the 2021–2022 season. In June 2016, the orchestra announced a further extension of his contract, through the 2025–26 season.

In February 2023, the orchestra announced a further extension of his contract, through the 2029–2030 season, along with a change in his title to music and artistic director.

=== Metropolitan Opera ===
Nézet-Séguin began annual appearances with the Metropolitan Opera in New York City in 2009, making his début on 31 December 2009, conducting a new production of Carmen. There followed Don Carlo in 2010 and in 2015, Faust in 2011, La traviata in 2013, and Rusalka in 2014. He opened the Met's 2015–16 season in September 2015 conducting a new production of Verdi's Otello, and returned in 2017 to conduct Der fliegende Holländer. On 2 June 2016, the Metropolitan Opera announced the appointment of Nézet-Séguin as the next music director, effective with the 2020–2021 season, with an initial contract of four years. He took the title of music director-designate as of the 2017–18 season. In February 2018, the company announced Nézet-Séguin's rescheduled assumption of the title of music director two years early, as of the 2018–2019 season, following the Met's dismissal of James Levine for sexual misconduct.

On 14 March 2022, Nézet-Séguin and the Metropolitan Opera performed a charity concert for Ukraine in the wake of the Russian invasion of the country with all ticket and album sales and donations supporting war relief efforts, a concert recorded for a digital release album on the Decca Classics and Deutsche Grammophon labels. In August 2024, the Metropolitan Opera announced the extension of Nézet-Séguin's contract as its music director through the 2029–2030 season. In May 2025 the music critic for The New Yorker observed: "Seven seasons into his tenure at the Met, Nézet-Séguin has yet to make much of a mark. There is something faceless about his music-making; everything sounds reasonably good, but nothing sticks in the mind." On the other hand, Claudia Cusano at Nuvo Magazine, August 2025, says that "Musicians often speak about Nézet-Séguin's respectful and collaborative approach. He doesn't impose his will from the podium. Instead, he invites interpretation, listens deeply, and creates space for shared ownership of the music. He brings a contagious energy."

=== Other major engagements ===
Nézet-Séguin made his UK conducting debut with the Northern Sinfonia in the 2005–06 season. He debuted with the London Philharmonic Orchestra (LPO) in March 2007, and with the Scottish Chamber Orchestra in April 2007. In November 2007, the LPO appointed Nézet-Séguin as their principal guest conductor, starting with the 2008–09 season. Following a May 2010 extension of his contract as LPO principal guest conductor, he stood down from the post in 2014. He made his Royal Opera House debut with Rusalka, the first stagings of the opera at Covent Garden, in 2012. He is also an honorary member and guest conductor of the Chamber Orchestra of Europe. He served as a creative consultant on Days of Happiness (Les Jours heureux), a 2023 drama film by Chloé Robichaud about an orchestra conductor.

He joined the faculty of the Curtis Institute of Music in 2013 as Mentor Conductor, where he was further appointed Head of Conducting as a part of an expansion of the school's conducting program in 2024. He teaches additionally at the summer academy of Domaine Forget and the Orchestre Métropolitain's Orchestral Conducting Academy.

He conducted the 2026 New Year's Concert of the Vienna Philharmonic.

== Personal life ==
Nézet-Séguin resides in Montreal and Philadelphia. His husband, Pierre Tourville, is a violist in Orchestre Métropolitain. He has multiple pets, and has made a playlist on Spotify and Apple music for pets to listen to as part of his social media activities.

== Honours ==
- Virginia Parker Prize (2000)
- Prix Opus (2005)
- Royal Philharmonic Society Young artists (2009)
- National Arts Centre Award, a companion award of the Governor General's Performing Arts Awards (2010)
- Doctorate honoris causa, UQAM (2011)
- Prix Denise-Pelletier, Government of the Province of Quebec (2011)
- Companion of the Order of Canada (2012)
- Doctorate honoris causa in music, McGill University, Montreal (2017)
- The Betty Webster Award, Orchestras Canada, Peterborough/Montreal (2020)
- Grammy Awards, winner in 2022 for Best Orchestral Performance for Price: Symphonies Nos. 1 & 3; in 2023 for Best Classical Solo Vocal Album for Voice of Nature – The Anthropocene with soprano Renée Fleming and Nézet-Séguin as accompanist, Best Opera Recording: for Blanchard: Fire Shut Up in My Bones with The Metropolitan Opera Orchestra and The Metropolitan Opera Chorus, in 2024 for Best Opera Recording for Blanchard: Champion and in 2025 for Best Compilation Soundtrack for Visual Media for Maestro: Music by Leonard Bernstein with the London Symphony Orchestra and Bradley Cooper and nominated for Best Opera Recording for Aucoin: Eurydice, also with The Metropolitan Opera Orchestra and The Metropolitan Opera Chorus in 2022; Best Classical Compendium for A Concert for Ukraine and for Best Orchestral Performance with the Philadelphia Orchestra for Price: Symphony No. 4; Dawson: Negro Folk Symphony for 2024, in 2025 for Best Opera Recording for Catan: Florencia en el Amazonas and Puts:Opera The Hours and in 2026 for Best Orchestral Performance, along with the Philadelphia Orchestra for Still & Bonds: Variations and Symphonies and Best Opera Recording for Tesori: Grounded.

== Discography ==
=== Orchestral works ===
- Nino Rota, Concertos, Orchestre Métropolitain, ATMA Classique (2003)
- Glière, Saint-Saëns, Ravel, et al., Conversations, Orchestre Métropolitain, ATMA Classique (2003)
- Mahler, Symphony no. 4, Orchestre Métropolitain, ATMA Classique (2004)
- Beethoven, Haydn, Caldara, et al., Arianna a Naxos, Orchestre Métropolitain, ATMA Classique (2004)
- Arthur De Greef, Orchestral Works, Flemish Radio Orchestra, Klara (2004)
- Saint-Saëns, Symphony No. 3, Orchestre Métropolitain, ATMA Classique (2006)
- Bruckner, Symphony No. 7, Orchestre Métropolitain, ATMA Classique (2007)
- Debussy, Britten, Pierre Mercure, La mer (et al.), Orchestre Métropolitain, ATMA Classique (2007)
- Pierre Lapointe, En concert, Orchestre Métropolitain, Audiogram (2007)
- Beethoven, Symphony No. 3 & Richard Strauss, Death and Transfiguration, Rotterdam Philharmonic, RPhO (2008)
- Bruckner, Symphony No. 9, Orchestre Métropolitain, ATMA Classique (2008)
- Beethoven, Violin Concerto, & Korngold, Violin Concerto, Renaud Capuçon (violin), Rotterdam Philharmonic, RPhO (2009)
- Bruckner, Symphony No. 8, Orchestre Métropolitain, ATMA Classique (2009)
- Ravel, Orchestral works, Rotterdam Philharmonic, EMI Classics (2009)
- Tchaikovsky, et al., Fantasy: A Night at the Opera, Emmanuel Pahud (flute), EMI Classics (2010)
- Brahms, A German Requiem, London Philharmonic Orchestra and Choir, LPO Ltd (2010)
- Berlioz, Symphonie fantastique, Rotterdam Philharmonic, BIS Records (2011)
- Florent Schmitt, La tragédie de Salomé, Orchestre Métropolitain, ATMA Classique (2011)
- Debussy, et al., Orchestre Métropolitain – 30 ans, Orchestre Métropolitain, ATMA Classique (2011)
- Richard Strauss, Ein Heldenleben & Vier letzte Lieder, with Dorothea Röschmann (soprano), BIS Records (2011)
- Bruckner, Symphony No. 4, Orchestre Métropolitain, ATMA Classique (2011)
- Mahler, Symphony No. 5, The Philadelphia Orchestra (2011)
- Bruckner, Symphony No. 6, Orchestre Métropolitain, ATMA Classique (2013)
- various, Portraits: The Clarinet Album, with Andreas Ottensamer, Rotterdam Philharmonic, Virgin Classics (2013)
- Tchaikovsky, Symphony No. 6, Pathétique, Rotterdam Philharmonic, Deutsche Grammophon (2013)
- Stravinsky, Le Sacre du printemps, & Stokowski–Bach, Toccata and Fugue in D minor, BWV 565, The Philadelphia Orchestra, Deutsche Grammophon (2013)
- Mahler, Das Lied von der Erde, London Philharmonic Orchestra, LPO Ltd (2013)
- Joaquín Rodrigo & de Falla, Concertos, with Miloš Karadaglić (guitar), London Philharmonic Orchestra, LPO Ltd (2014)
- Robert Schumann, The (Four) Symphonies, Chamber Orchestra of Europe, Deutsche Grammophon (2014)
- Rachmaninov, Rachmaninov Variations, Rhapsody on a Theme of Paganini, Op.43, Daniil Trifonov (piano), The Philadelphia Orchestra, Deutsche Grammophon (2015)
- Dvorak, Dvorak: Othello Overture – Symphony Nos. 6 & 7, London Philharmonic Orchestra (2017)
- Mendelssohn, Symphonies 1–5, Chamber Orchestra of Europe and RIAS Kammerchor, Deutsche Grammophon (2017)
- Prokofiev, VISIONS OF PROKOFIEV, Romeo and Juliet, Op.64, Violin Concerto No.1 in D Major, Op.19, Cinderella, Op.87, Violin Concerto No.2 in G Minor, Op.63, The Love For Three Oranges, Op.33, Chamber Orchestra of Europe, Deutsche Grammophon (2018)
- Bernstein, Mass, The Philadelphia Orchestra, Deutsche Grammophon (2018)
- Rachmaninov, Destination Rachmaninov: Departure, Piano Concertos 2&4, Daniil Trifonov (piano), The Philadelphia Orchestra, Deutsche Grammophon (2018)
- Mozart, Piano Concerto No.20, K.466, Seong-Jin Cho (piano), Chamber Orchestra of Europe, Deutsche Grammophon (2018)
- Florence Price, Florence Price: Symphonies Nos. 1 & 3, The Philadelphia Orchestra, Deutsche Grammophon (2021)
- Mahler, Symphony No. 10, Orchestre Métropolitain, ATMA Classique ACD2 2711 (recorded 2014, released 2015)
- De Sabata, Suite Op. 2, Juventus, La notte di Plàton, Gethsemani, The Philadelphia Orchestra, Deutsche Grammophon (2023)
- Brahms, Symphonies 1–4, Chamber Orchestra of Europe, Deutsche Grammophon (2024)

=== Vocal recitals ===
- Kurt Weill, Lieder, Diane Dufresne (soprano), Orchestre Métropolitain, ATMA Classique (2005)
- Mozart, Lieder, Suzie LeBlanc (soprano), Nézet-Séguin (piano), ATMA Classique (2006)
- Puccini, et al., Marc Hervieux (tenor), Orchestre Métropolitain, ATMA Classique (2010)

=== Operas ===
- Gounod, Roméo et Juliette, Mozarteum Orchestra Salzburg (Salzburg Festival), Deutsche Grammophon (2008)
- Mozart, Don Giovanni, Mahler Chamber Orchestra, Deutsche Grammophon (2012)
- Mozart, Così fan tutte, Chamber Orchestra of Europe, Deutsche Grammophon (2013)
- Mozart, Die Entführung aus dem Serail, Chamber Orchestra of Europe, Deutsche Grammophon (2015)
- Mozart, Le nozze di Figaro, Chamber Orchestra of Europe, Deutsche Grammophon (2016)
- Mozart, La Clemenza di Tito, Chamber Orchestra of Europe, Deutsche Grammophon (2018)
- Mozart, Die Zauberflöte, Chamber Orchestra of Europe, Deutsche Grammophon (2020)

=== Operas on video ===
- Bizet, Carmen, Metropolitan Opera, Deutsche Grammophon (2010)
- Dvorák, Rusalka, Metropolitan Opera, Decca Classics (2014)
- Gounod, Faust, Metropolitan Opera, Decca Classics (2014)

Cultural offices
Preceded by Joseph Rescigno	Principal Conductor and Artistic Director, Orchestre Métropolitain; 2000–present	Succeeded by incumbent
Preceded by Valery Gergiev	Principal Conductor, Rotterdam Philharmonic Orchestra; 2008–2018	Succeeded by Lahav Shani
Preceded by James Levine	Music Director, Metropolitan Opera; 2018–present	Succeeded by incumbent
