= Abraham Lincoln Walks at Midnight =

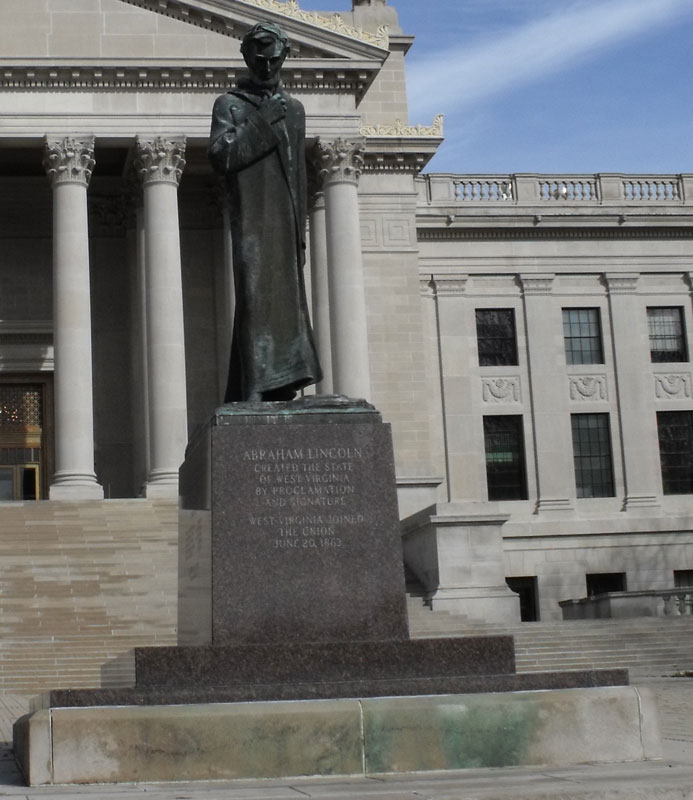
A statue of Abraham Lincoln in a robe, looking pensive

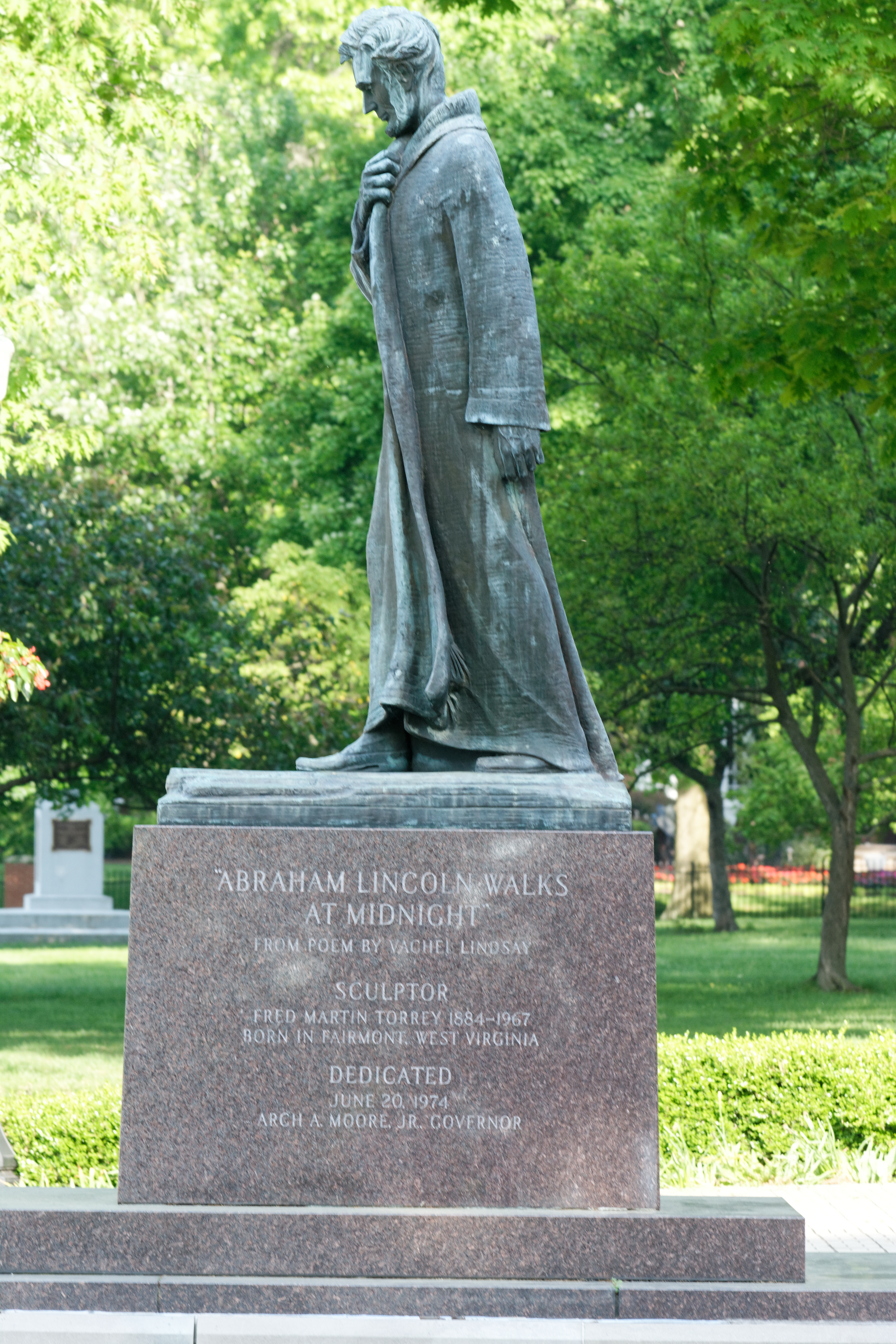
Side view of the statue by Fred Torrey

"Abraham Lincoln Walks at Midnight" is a 1914 poem by American poet Vachel Lindsay. It portrays Abraham Lincoln walking the streets of Springfield, Illinois, stirred from his eternal sleep, a man, who even in death, is burdened by the tragedies of the modern world. At the time the poem was written, Lindsay was depressed by knowledge of the blood and death exacted by World War I.

The poem was included in Louis Untermeyer's anthology, Modern American Poetry, published in 1919 (see 1919 in poetry). This poem is now used in many schools and districts as an inspirational figure of the Civil War, as well as United States history.

== Settings ==
In 1953 composer Roy Harris wrote a chamber cantata based upon this poem, scored for mezzo-soprano, violin, cello, and piano. Three settings by African American composer Florence Price were rediscovered in 2009 (a setting for orchestra, organ, chorus, and soloists, premiered on April 12, 2019, by the Du Bois Orchestra and Lyricora Chamber Choir in Cambridge, Massachusetts; a setting for chorus, soloists, and piano, premiered on May 4, 2019, by the Andover Choral Society, North Andover, Massachusetts; and a setting of the Introduction and part of the Overture for very large orchestra).

== See also ==
- Memorials to Abraham Lincoln
