= Price (crater) =

Crater on Mercury

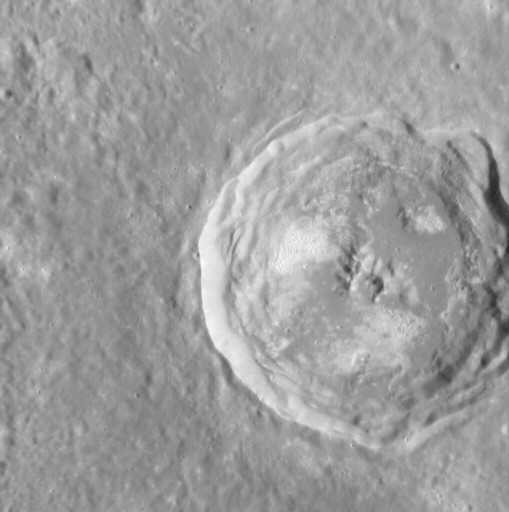
- MESSENGER NAC
- Planet: Mercury
- Coordinates: 15.15°N 300.84°W
- Quadrangle: Derain
- Diameter: 38.0 km (23.6 mi)
- Eponym: Florence Price

Price is a crater on Mercury. Its name was adopted by the International Astronomical Union (IAU) on February 7, 2025. The crater is named for American composer and musician Florence Beatrice Price.

Price has extensive patches of hollows on its floor.

Price is to the south of the prominent crater Rachmaninoff. Apārangi Planitia is to the southeast.

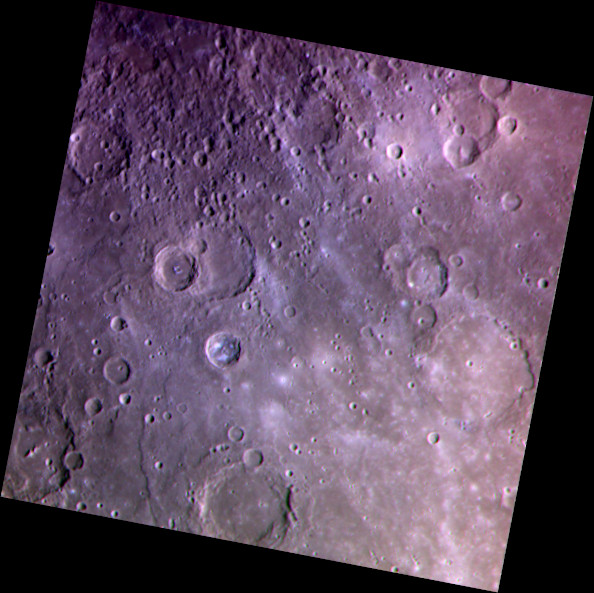
Exaggerated color image with Price below left of center and part of Apārangi Planitia in lower right.

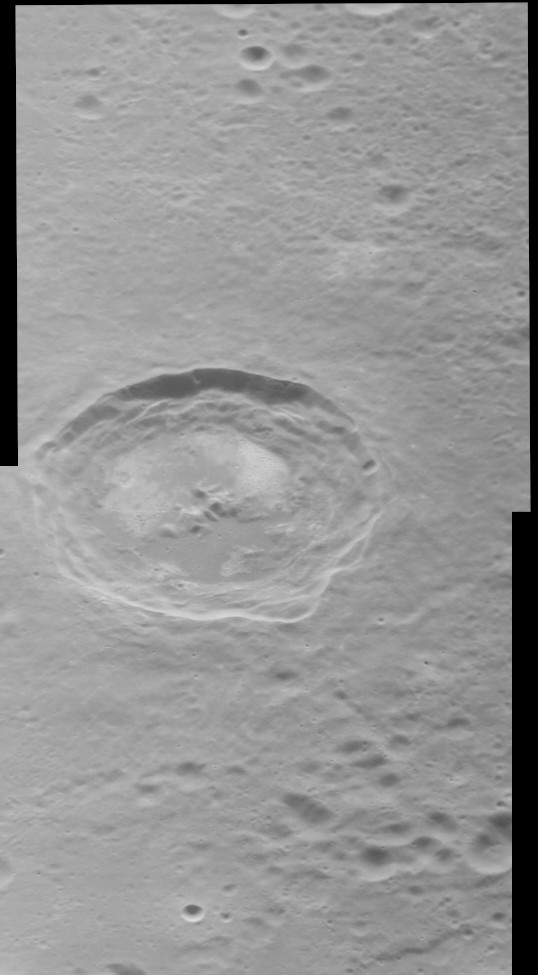
Oblique view
