= Symphony No. 3 (Price) =

Symphony by Florence Price

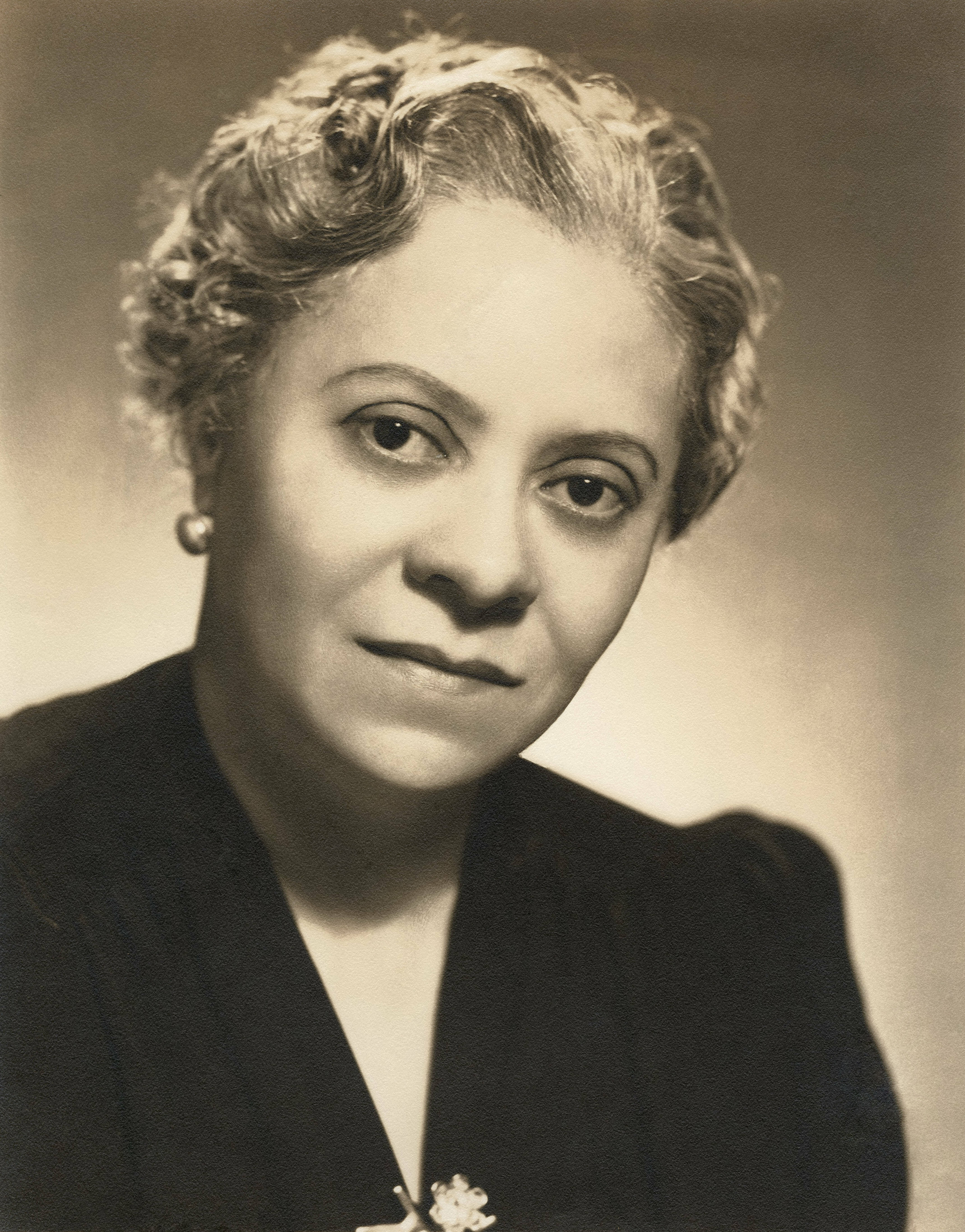
Price, date unknown

The Symphony No. 3 in C minor is a symphony for orchestra composed by Florence Price in 1938, and revised in 1940. The work was commissioned by the Works Progress Administration's Federal Music Project during the height of the Great Depression. It was first performed at the Detroit Institute of Arts on November 6, 1940, by the Michigan WPA Symphony Orchestra under the conductor Valter Poole.

The composition is Price's third symphony, following her Symphony in E minor—the first symphony by a Black woman to be performed by a major American orchestra—and her lost Symphony No. 2.

== History ==
Price started writing the symphony in the summer of 1938, but later revised the work prior to its 1940 premiere. In a letter dated October 22, 1940 to Frederick Schwass of the Michigan WPA Orchestra, Price stated,

My dear Mr. Schwass:

I have your letter of October 21. They Symphony No. 3 in C Minor was composed in the late summer of 1938, laid aside for a year and then revised. It is intended to be Negroid in character and expression. In it no attempt, however, has been made to project Negro music solely in the purely traditional manner. None of the themes are adaptations or derivations of folk songs.

The intention behind the writing of this work was a not too deliberate attempt to picture a cross-section of present-day Negro life and thought with its heritage of that which is past, paralleled, or influenced by concepts of the present day.

On September 18 1941, Price wrote her final letter to conductor Sergei Koussevitzky, where she described the symphony once again:

I have a symphony in which I tried to portray a cross section of Negro life and psychology as it is today, influenced by urban life north of the Mason and Dixon line. It is not 'program' music. I merely had in mind the life and music of the Negro of today and for that reason treated my themes in a manner difference from what I would have done if I had centered my attention upon the religious themes of the antebellum days, or yet the ragtime and jazz that followed; rather a fusion of these, colored by present cultural influences.

== Composition ==
Price's third symphony is notably different from her first symphony in that it uses less African-American themes; its beginning is almost Wagnerian. Some passages resemble Russian composers like Shostakovich. The symphony has a duration of roughly 30 minutes and is composed in four movements:

1. Andante – Allegro
2. Andante ma non troppo
3. Juba: Allegro
4. Scherzo: Finale

The work as a whole remains firmly within Price's realm of melodic writing style, but, in contrast to her earlier first symphony, Price produces rich textures and incorporates both antiphonal instrument groups and counterpoint into her work. The symphony marks a clear evolution in her style, leaning into more Late-Romantic and at times even Modernist approaches to composition. According to scholar and Price biographer Linda Rae Brown, "...[Price] had moved in a different direction compositionally, one that while still steeped in the African American tradition, presents a modern approach - a synthesis, rather than a retrospective view, of African American life and culture. The necessity to write overtly black themes and underscore them with simple dance rhythms is gone. The Symphony No. 3 in C Minor reflects a maturity of style and a new attitude toward black musical materials."

=== I. Andante – Allegro ===
The first movement follows sonata-allegro form, beginning with a brief, slower andante section which highlights chromaticism, until the beginning of the allegro begins a C pentatonic theme. The second theme of the movement emerges in E-flat, but far more lyrical than its previous counterpart. Price demonstrates her mastery of timbre throughout this section, stating the E-flat pentatonic theme first in the trombone, then moving throughout the rest of the brass and wind sections. The thematic material in this movement incorporates the tonalities and idioms of Black folk music without directly quoting any existing spirituals or other melodies.

=== II. Andante ma non troppo ===
The second movement of Price's third recalls elements the composer used in her first symphony, including the recurrence of antiphonal instrument choirs. It opens with a rich oboe solo underscored by low woodwinds which is then echoed by the strings. A second theme appears in the solo bassoon, this time based on the F pentatonic scale. Price then diverges from these tonalities, shifting into a larger section, interrupted by powerful brass and timpani, which features dissonance and polytonality before ending the movement on a plagal cadence, reminiscent of sacred hymns. Program notes for the Los Angeles Philharmonic by musicologist John Michael Cooper describe the movement as "tranquil... but the serene beauty of its opening section is repeatedly interrupted by unsettled whole-tone material that reminds us that this is, after all, music of the 20th century, not the 19th."

=== III. Juba: Allegro ===
Like Price's first symphony, the third movement of this work is in the style of a Juba dance. In her October letter to Schwass, Price stated,

In all of my works which have been done in the sonata form with Negroid idiom, I have incorporated a juba as one of the several movements because it seems to me be no more impossible to conceive of Negroid music devoid of the spiritualistic theme on the one hand than strongly syncopated rhythms of the juba on the other.

However, unlike her first Juba movement, Price omits the rhythmic ostinato, allowing the percussion to imply the basic beat of the dance. Per Brown's analysis, the listener of this movement could "...be reminded of Gershwin's popular music and the Latin-American habanera dance, which, long before 1940, had made its way into American popular music."

=== IV. Scherzo: Finale ===
The last movement is a 6/8 scherzo in sonata form. The main theme is built around triplet figures that arpeggiate the tonic, although with an added seventh that contributes to a feeling of harmonic depth. Price plays with chromaticism once again in the finale, repeated motives in different tonal centers with altered tones to provide variation. The coda is especially notable for its length; 70 measures, longer than any other in her symphonic repertoire.

=== Instrumentation ===
The work is scored for an orchestra comprising piccolo, three flutes, two oboes, English horn, two clarinets, bass clarinet, two bassoons, four horns, three trumpets, three trombones, tuba, harp, timpani, percussion, celeste, and strings. The instrumentation of the third symphony is expanded from Price's first symphony, including the addition of sets of three woodwinds rather than two, as well as a larger percussion section, which encompasses orchestral bells, snare drum, bass drum, cymbals, triangle, wood blocks, castanets, tambourine, xylophone, and sand blocks.

== Reception ==
Contemporary reception for the symphony was positive. Reviewing the 1940 world premiere, J. D. Callaghan of the Detroit Free Press wrote:

Mrs. Price, both in the [piano] concerto and in the symphony, spoke in the musical idiom of her own people, and spoke with authority. There was inherent in both works all the emotional warmth of the American Negro, so that the evening became one of profound melody satisfaction. In the symphony there was a slow movement of majestic beauty, a third in which the rhythmic preference of the Negro found scope in a series of dance forms, and a finale which swept forward with great vigor.

First Lady Eleanor Roosevelt also attended a performance, and wrote about Price and her work warmly in her column My Day:

[The band] was followed by another dance orchestra and, finally, by a full symphony orchestra, the fourth best WPA orchestra in the country. They played two movements in a new symphony by Florence Price, one of the few women to write symphonic music. She is a colored woman and a native of Chicago, who has certainly made a contribution to our music. The orchestra rendered her symphony beautifully and then played a Bach choral which ended the concert, much to my regret.

== Symphonic Reflections ==
The piece is sometimes performed in an abbreviated form, suggested by Thomas Wilkins, called Symphonic Reflections. In this format, the first movement is omitted and the remaining three re-ordered (Juba: Allegro, Andante ma non troppo, Scherzo: Finale) to form a fast-slow-fast pattern.

== Recordings ==
The premiere recording of Price's Third Symphony was released by The Women's Philharmonic under the Koch International Classics label in 2001 alongside two of Price's other orchestral works including her tone poems The Oak and Mississippi River Suite. Additional recordings by the ORF Vienna Radio Symphony with Naxos Records and the Philadelphia Orchestra with Deutsche Grammaphon have since been released as well. Reviews of the latter were largely positive, such as this excerpt from The Classic Review,

Nézet-Séguin provides his solo players plenty of room for rubato and exhibits a masterful sense of the long line and the music’s architecture, surely a benefit of his experience conducting Bruckner. If forced to choose one movement from this recording to play for a first-time listener, it would be the slow movement of the third symphony (track 6), which features one beautiful melody after another, accompanied by a kaleidoscope of orchestral hues (played here with rapt introspection) that are profoundly touching.

== See also ==
- Symphony No. 1 (Price)
- Symphony No. 4 (Price)
