= Du Bois Orchestra =

Symphony orchestra in Massachusetts, United States

The Du Bois Orchestra is a Cambridge, Massachusetts-based symphony orchestra dedicated to the promotion and performance of classical music in the context of diversity.

The orchestra was founded in 2015 by Harvard graduate students Karen Cueva and Kai Johannes Polzhofer as the Du Bois Orchestra at Harvard to engage with topics of social inclusion, equity, and justice through classical music. The orchestra was named after W.E.B. Du Bois, who was the first African American to receive a Ph.D. from Harvard University.

Polzhofer served as the orchestra's first conductor from 2015-17. During this time the orchestra regularly presented moderated concerts with music of composers from globally and historically underrepresented, disenfranchised racial, ethnic, and cultural groups in dialogue with the canonic classical symphonic repertoire. Members were taken from the local music community, especially students and faculty members from Harvard University, Longy School of Music, Massachusetts Institute of Technology, and New England Conservatory. The Du Bois Orchestra found its home at University Lutheran Church, a community active in primarily volunteer public service as well as hosting the Harvard Square Homeless Shelter. In March 2017 the orchestra was invited to take part in the congregation's official event declaring University Lutheran Church a Sanctuary Church and to perform symphonies of Joseph Boulogne. The Du Bois Orchestra additionally organized regularly educational and community engagement projects for children and young people in cooperation with institutions like the Harvard Graduate School of Education, New York City-based Sistema style Opportunity Music Project, the W.E.B. Du Bois Graduate Society Harvard, and Massachusetts Department of Youth Services.

Under its second conductor, Nathaniel Meyer (2017–20), the orchestra developed into an independent professional orchestra, deepened the repertoire of neglected US-American music, rediscovered and gave in 2018 the world-premiere of Florence Price’s "Abraham Lincoln Walks at Midnight".

In 2021 the Du Bois Orchestra announced for the new leadership team Joe LaRocca (executive director) and Dominique Hoskin (artistic director and conductor). The orchestra regularly features distinguished guest artists and dynamic collaborators, including double bassist Xavier Foley, violinists Angelo Xiang Yu and Thomas Lee Cooper, and internationally acclaimed pianists Clayton Stephenson and Aljoša Jurinić. The orchestra is supported in part by the Cambridge Arts Council for Art for Racial Justice.
