= Bessie Mayle =

American singer

- Mayle, from the 1949 yearbook of Howard University
- Born: Hagerstown, Maryland, U.S.
- Died: May 17, 1963; Washington, D.C., U.S.
- Occupations: Singer, poet, college professor

Bessie Helena Mayle (died May 17, 1963) was an American soprano singer, poet, and educator. She taught at historically black colleges and universities, including Barber-Scotia College, South Carolina State College, Johnson C. Smith University and Howard University.

== Early life and education ==
Mayle was born in Hagerstown, Maryland, the daughter of Warner Washington Mayle. Her father was a Presbyterian minister.

Mayle attended the Margaret Barber Seminary, and graduated from Spelman College in 1931; she won a creative writing award at Spelman, for a play she wrote. She earned a master's degree from Boston University in 1932, with a fellowship from the Julius Rosenwald Fund. Her thesis was titled "History and Interpretation of the Pre-Reformation Carol and the Negro Spiritual."

== Career ==
Mayle taught music at Barber-Scotia College, South Carolina State College, and Johnson C. Smith University and, beginning in 1942, in the religion department at Howard University. Her poem "Night" (1930) was set to music as an art song by composer Florence Price in 1945. She wrote the words and music to other songs, including "The Door to My Heart" (1951) and "No One But You" (1951).

Alice Eversman described Mayle's voice as "of lovely texture, small and pure, but arresting for its sweetness of quality." She was known for her eclectic programs, which included art songs by living American composers. For example, she sang work by Wintter Watts at a 1939 concert in Atlanta, and works by Mark Fax at a Washington, D.C. concert in 1950, and gave the world premiere performance of Howard Swanson's "Songs for Patricia" in Minneapolis in 1952. She gave a concert at the National Gallery of Art in 1953. The Washington Afro-American music critic noted her "naturally fine vocal organ of not unusual size but true." Another critic at the same show applauded Mayle's choice of modern songs, and the unusual flute accompaniment.

== Publications ==
- "Night" and "Skylines" (1930, poems, The Crisis)
- "Clogged Springs" (1930, one-act play, Spelman Messenger)

== Personal life ==
Mayle died in 1963, in Washington, D.C. She was due to receive her Ph.D. from the University of Southern Illinois in 1964.
