= Karen Walwyn =

American pianist and composer

Karen Michele Walwyn (born 1962 in New York) is an American concert pianist, classical music composer, and recording artist. She is an interpreter, advocate, and scholar of Florence B. Price and is noted as the first pianist to record the Florence Price Concerto in E minor for Piano along with a number of other premiere solo piano works of Price which drew many praises including a quote by James Harrington, October 25, 2022, from Fanfare Magazine, “her playing captures the essence of Price's inventive writing with personality, sensitivity and flair”. She currently is on faculty as Professor of Piano at the Berklee College of Music.

== Biography ==
=== Early life ===
Karen Walwyn started piano with her father, Claude E. Walwyn, at the age of 3 years old. With a piano in the home, her maternal grandmother, Elizabeth Booker, who was an organist in Cumberland, Virginia, suggested to her daughter, Dorothy B. Tyler, that Karen, (Walwyn), was ready for piano based on the how much Karen was playing piano on her own. Walwyn was discovered to have perfect pitch by the age of 4.

=== Education ===
Walwyn started her Bachelor's of Music at Broward Community College, having studied with Mrs. Rosalie Gregory since high school. She continued her undergraduate studies with Concert Pianist Ivan Davis at the University of Miami and then with James Robert Floyd with whom she earned both a Bachelor's of Music (B.M.) and a Master's of Music (M.M.) in piano performance.

Walwyn studied with pianists Susan Starr and Theodore Lettvin for her doctoral degree at the University of Michigan, where she won the University of Michigan Concerto Competition. After three years at the doctoral level, she taught as assistant professor of Piano at Southwest Missouri State University in Springfield, Missouri. She returned to Ann Arbor after two years of teaching to complete her degree. She received her Doctorate of Musical Arts (DMA) in piano performance under the guidance of Arthur Greene in 1994.

=== Career ===
Walwyn received over $55,000 in funding from her applications to the Rackham Graduate School Research Grant Office to record African-American classical music. She recorded the first of a two-album series for Albany Records entitled "Dark Fires" in 1997; the second volume was released in 2000. Most of the works on both CDs were world premiere recordings.

In 2003, Walwyn recorded with Rodney Mack on the Spirit of the Trumpeter CD for Albany Records.

The September 11 attacks catalyzed Walwyn's compositional career. Since 2001, she has been commissioned to compose works for solo piano, chamber works, choir, and orchestra. Her compositions have been performed at the Kennedy Center, McCrary Theatre, NPR, Constitution Hall, Bridges Hall of Music, The Roy and Edna Disney/CalArts Theater (REDCAT), the Piccolo Spoleto, and McNeir Hall. Many of her pieces depict historical figures or contemporary tragedies, such as the 2015 Charleston church shooting.

As a soloist, Walwyn has performed with numerous symphony orchestras, and her solo engagements have commanded halls in the United States including Hawaii, as well in the Virgin Islands, and in Europe.

Walwyn joined Howard University in 2004, where she was Associate Professor of Piano and was the Coordinator of Keyboard Studies. Walwyn has also taught at Interlochen Center for the Arts, Bethune Cookman College, American School of Barcelona, Terrassa Centre d' Educacio de Musica, and the University of Michigan. She is a member of the Music Teachers National Association and the Maryland Music Teachers Association. In association, she also served as the Chair of the Piano Competition Committee for the National Association of Negro Musicians.

Walwyn was selected as a Mellon HBCU Faculty Fellow by the Duke University John Hope Franklin Humanities Institute in 2011. With this award, she was afforded a trip to South Africa to conduct research on Nelson Mandela. This prepared her for her work commissioned and performed by Dr. Gerald Knight and the Elon University Choral at Elon University entitled Of Dance and Struggle; A Musical Tribute of the life of Nelson Mandela for choir and African drums.

In 2014 Walwyn became the first African-American female Steinway Artist as a concert pianist and composer.

At Berklee, Walwyn was a recipient of the Faculty Development Grant Program and a recipient of the Faculty Recording Grant Program during the winter semester of 2023. Walwyn continues to perform concerts and orchestral engagements as she accepts new commissions and continues to pursue her recording and research on Florence Price.

=== Connection to Florence B. Price ===
Walwyn is a champion for the music of Florence B. Price. Her scholarly interest in Price developed during her doctoral studies at the University of Michigan.

Morris Phibbs, the former executive director of The Center of Black Music Research, invited Walwyn to record a premiere performance of the Florence B. Price Concerto in One Movement in E minor. It was orchestrated by composer Trevor Weston, with the New Black Music Repertory Ensemble. Leslie Dunner directed the 2011 performance. In 2011, Albany Records manufactured and distributed the recording. In the 2015 Dr. James Greeson Emmy-nominated documentary, The Caged Bird: The Life and Music of Florence B. Price,” Walwyn performs as the featured pianist.

Walwyn was the featured guest on NPR's Classical Breakdown with host Jonathan Banther on the subject of Florence Price which aired on February 26, 2021.

Walwyn was a guest pianist and scholar on the PBS Great Performances : Now Hear This; The Lost Manuscripts of Composer Florence Price with Host Scott Yoo from the Florence Price and the American Migration aired on 4/15/22.

As a scholar of Florence B. Price, Walwyn traveled to Little Rock, Arkansas, in 2016 to visit Price's childhood home address. During her trip, she came into contact with Price's original scores and manuscripts in the Special Collections at the University of Arkansas. She also met with Dr. Barbara Jackson, the first editor of Florence B. Price's works, before Schirmer purchased the Price estate. Her journey concluded in Chicago. She visited Price's untombed grave with Morris Phibbs and Dr. Barbara Wright. She also viewed the property where Price's abandoned home stands and which is where Price's music was discovered in 2009.

With the Arkansas Symphony Orchestra in 2021, Walwyn premiered the newly released recording of Price's authentic score of the Concerto in One Movement in E minor under the direction of Maestro Geoffrey Robson. On April 9, 2022, the 135th birthday of Florence Price, Walwyn released her first solo piano music by Florence B. Price on Kadoro Klassics entitled Florence B. Price. It received five stars from Colin Clark, Fanfare Magazine.

== Material ==
=== Compositions ===
- Beyond Broken Bridges (2022)
  - Orchestra
    - Commissioned by Maestro Jacob Bergman and the Walla Walla Symphony Orchestra
- Lavender Rainbow (2021)
  - Carillon
    - Commissioned by Dr. Pamela Ruiter-Feenstra
- Mother (2020)
  - Horn and piano
    - Commissioned by Debra Sherrill-Ward
- Diabelli Variation (2019)
  - Solo Piano
    - Commissioned by Lia Jenson-Abbot
- Hyperion in the Red Forest (2018)
  - Soprano, French Horn, and Piano
    - Commissioned by Laura Ball
- For Spangled Hearts (2017)
  - Viola and cello
    - Commissioned by Tom Flaherty
- Angels Nine (2016)
  - Horn trio and piano
    - Commissioned by Debra Sherrill-Ward
- Mother Emanuel (2015)
  - Solo piano
- Of Dance & Struggle: A Musical Tribute on the Life of Nelson Mandela (2012)
  - Vocal ensemble
    - Commissioned by Dr. Gerald Knight
- Sight Reading for Piano in the Twelve Major Keys (2010)
  - Set of piano studies
- Reflections on 9/11 (2008)
  - Solo piano

=== Compact Disc Recordings ===
- Florence Price for Solo Piano (2022)
  - Kadoro Klassics
- Concerto in One Movement in E minor for solo piano by Florence Price (2022)
  - Arkansas Symphony Orchestra for Little Rock
- Concerto in One Movement in E minor for solo piano by Florence Price (2011)
  - Albany Records
- Reflections on 9/11 by Karen Walwyn (2009)
  - Albany Records
- Creative Afternoons: Classical Music for Children (2006)
  - Kadoro Klassics
- Spirit of the Trumpeter, Rodney Mack (Trumpet), Karen Walwyn (Piano) (2003)
  - Albany Records
- Dark Fires: Walwyn and Friends, Volume Two (2000)
  - Albany Records
- Dark Fires: 20th Century for American Music, Volume One (1997)
  - Albany Records
