= Ethiopia's Shadow in America =

Orchestral work by Florence Price

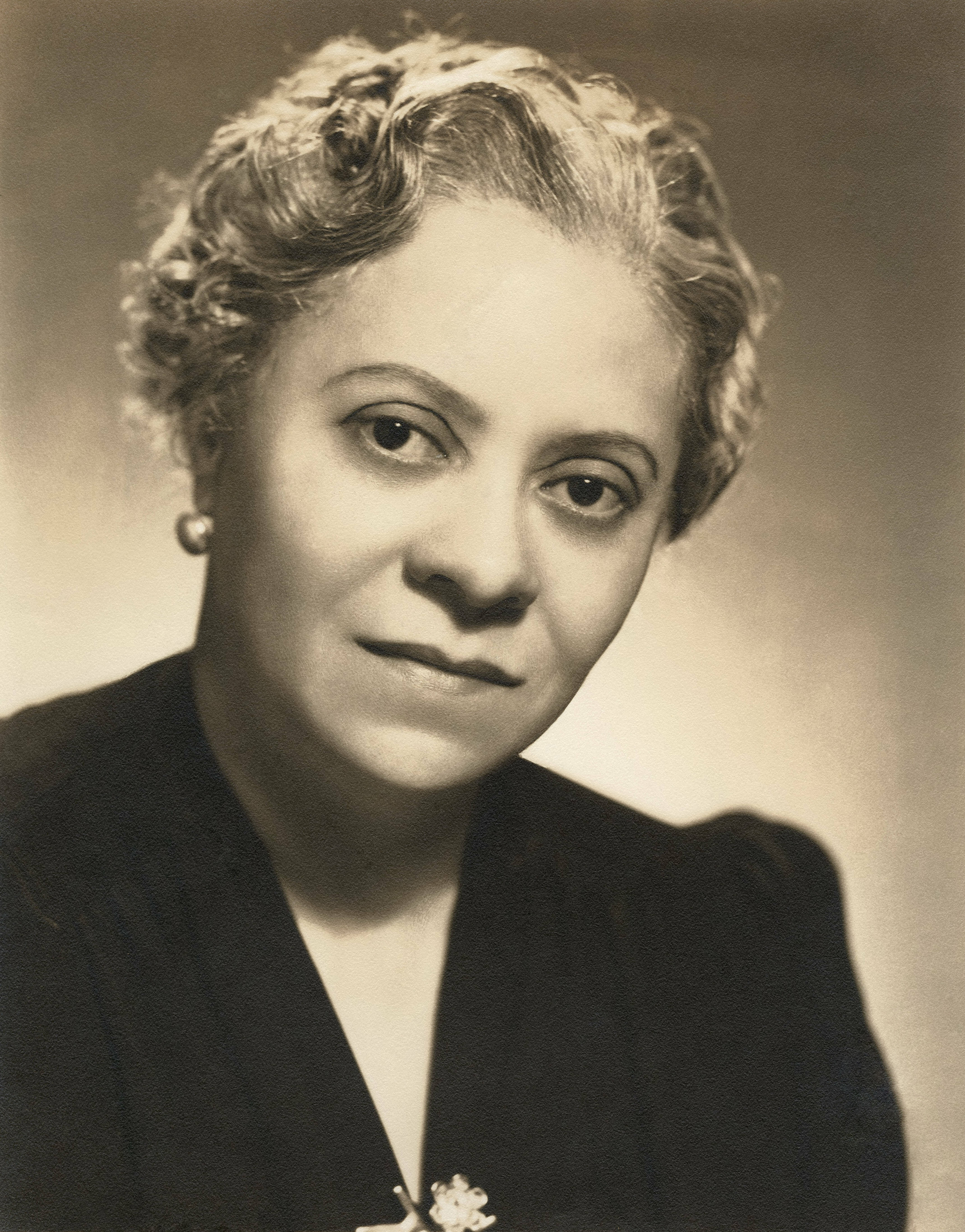
Price, date unknown

Ethiopia's Shadow in America is an orchestral composition written by Florence Price in 1932. It received honorable mention for piano pieces in that year's Rodman Wanamaker Music Contest.

Many of Price's works, including this, were lost for a long time and were found again in 2009. Ethiopia's Shadow was performed by the University of Arkansas Symphony Orchestra in January 2015. On September 30, 2018, Jordan Randall Smith conducted the Hopkins Concert Orchestra in a performance he claims is the first East Coast performance. On March 8, 2020, the Washington, DC, premiere of Ethiopia's Shadow in America was performed by the DC Concert Orchestra, conducted by Randall Stewart. The work was performed by the Akron Symphony Orchestra on November 13, 2021.

This work was included in an album by the New York Youth Symphony that won the 2023 Grammy for Best Orchestral Performance.

== Structure ==
Price divided the composition in three parts:

1. The Arrival of the Negro in America when first brought here as a slave – (Introduction and Allegretto)
2. His Resignation and Faith – (Andante)
3. His Adaptation – (Allegro) – A fusion of his native and acquired impulses

== Instrumentation ==
The piece is scored for piccolo, two flutes, two oboes, two clarinets, two bassoons, four horns, two trumpets, two tenor trombones, bass trombone, tuba, timpani, cymbals, suspended cymbal, bass drum, snare drum, woodblock, glockenspiel, xylophone, celesta, and strings.
