= Althea Waites =

American concert pianist (b. 1939)

- Born: 1939 (age 86–87)
- Occupations: Pianist, educator
- Instrument: Piano

Althea Waites (born 1939) is an American concert pianist. She has performed across the United States and internationally. She is currently a faculty member at California State University, Long Beach.

== Biography ==
Waites was born in 1939 in New Orleans, Louisiana, to a musical family; her father and grandfather played the piano, and her mother sang in the church choir. She began studying piano at age five. She made her debut with the New Orleans Philharmonic at age 17.

Waites studied music at Xavier University in New Orleans and went on to earn a master's degree in piano from Yale University. She also studied with Russell Sherman at the New England Conservatory. After graduating, Waites toured as a performer and taught at a number of East Coast institutions, including Smith College.

In the 1970s, she moved to the West Coast, teaching at California State University, San Bernardino, and the University of California, Riverside. She became a full-time faculty member at Cal State in 1979. In addition to instructing private and group piano lessons, she taught music theory and African-American music history. She later joined the faculty at California State Polytechnic, Pomona, where she was artist-in-residence. For more than 20 years, she has taught at California State University, Long Beach.

Waites has said that she has been on a "crusade" to perform music by Black women composers. In 1987, she made her recording debut with an album of piano works by Florence Price. She was the first pianist to make a recording of Price's music. A review in the academic journal The Black Perspective in Music highlighted the album's significance as a record of an important figure (Price) in American music history.

Waites has performed across the United States and in Canada, Europe, and Latin America. In 1989, Waites toured the then-Soviet Union, performing in Moscow, Kiev, and Leningrad (now Saint Petersburg).

In 1993, she released the album Black Diamonds, on which she performed works by African-American composers, including Price, William Grant Still, Margaret Bonds, and Ed Bland. Her Grammy-nominated 2023 album, Reflections in Time, continues her project of (in her words) "mainstreaming" new music and the music of composers of color, presenting world-premiere recordings of music by Margaret Bonds, Jeremy Siskind, and Curt Cacioppo along with three of the "Three-Fours" of Samuel Coleridge-Taylor.

== Critical reception ==
A 1980 review in The San Bernardino County Sun described Waites as a "good technician" and "an excellent performer" who "projects a sense of informality, of conversing with her listeners intimately with her music." For a 1986 performance of Florence Price's Sonata in E Minor, the Los Angeles Times praised her "technical assurance and probing artistry."

The American Music Guide highlighted her performance of Price's music on her 1993 album, Black Diamonds, observing that she plays "with great respect and dignity, making the listener aware of the quality of the music and its expressive content."

== Selected recordings ==
- Althea Waites Performs the Piano Music of Florence Price (1987), Cambria Records.
- Black Diamonds: Althea Waites Plays Music by African-American Composers (1993), Cambria Master Recordings.
- "Along The Western Shore (1997)
- "Celebration" (Music of American Composers) 2012
