= Symphony No. 1 (Price) =

Symphony by Florence Price

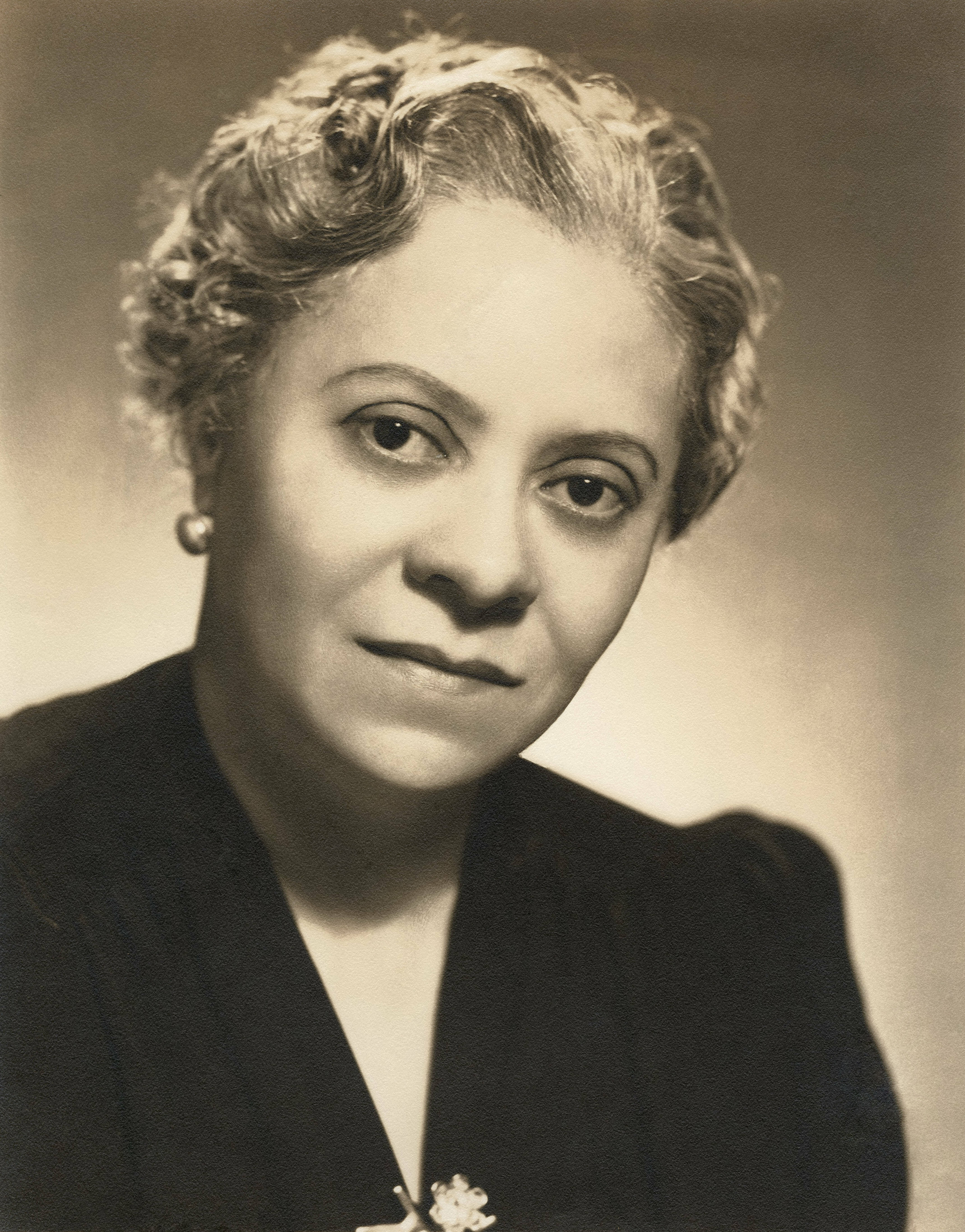
Price, date unknown

The Symphony No. 1 in E minor is the first symphony written by the American composer Florence Price. The work was completed in 1932 and was first performed by the Chicago Symphony Orchestra under the conductor Frederick Stock in June 1933. The piece was Price's first full-scale orchestral composition and was the first symphony by a Black woman to be performed by a major American orchestra.

== Background ==
The symphony was composed between January 1931 and early 1932 while Price recovered from a broken foot. In February 1932, Price entered the symphony in the Rodman Wanamaker Competition, in addition to three other concert works that she composed. While all of Price's entries received recognition, her Symphony in E minor won the first place $500 prize for a symphonic work. The award brought Price national recognition and caught the attention of the conductor Frederick Stock of the Chicago Symphony Orchestra. Stock later premiered the symphony with the Chicago Symphony Orchestra on 15 June 1933 at the Auditorium Theatre, Chicago.

In this symphony, Price calls upon multiple sources of inspiration from both the Western classical tradition and Black musical idioms. Most obvious is her replacement of the conventional third-movement scherzo with a Juba dance, but similarly the influence of African-American spirituals can be heard in many of the pentatonic themes used throughout the work. Additionally, Price drew inspiration from Antonín Dvořák’s Symphony No. 9 in E minor, “From the New World”, with Rae Linda Brown noting that:

Dvořák’s “New World” Symphony and the spiritual inspiration of Coleridge-Taylor were creative influences on Price’s work. … an examination of Price’s symphony reveals that she had thoroughly studied Dvorak’s score as well. To judge from its overall content, formal organisation, orchestration, and spirit, she seems to have taken quite personally the Bohemian composer’s directive to create a national composition.

== Instrumentation ==
The work is scored for the following orchestra:

Woodwinds
2 Piccolos
2 Flutes
2 Oboes
2 Clarinets in A
2 Bassoons

Brass
4 Horns
2 Trumpets in A
3 Trombones
Tuba

Percussion (3 players)
Timpani
Bass drum
Cymbals
Celesta
‘Cathedral Chimes’ (see clarification below)
Triangle
Large African Drum
Small African Drum
Glockenspiel
Wind Whistle
Snare Drum

Strings
Violins I, II
Violas
Cellos
Double Basses

Most performances of the work use tubular bells for the ‘Cathedral Chimes’ in the first and second movements; however, the organ at the Auditorium Theatre had cathedral chime stops that may have been used at the premiere.

== Form ==
The symphony has a duration of roughly 40 minutes and is composed in four numbered movements.

1. Allegro [ma] non troppo (E minor)
2. Largo, maestoso (E major)
3. Juba Dance: Allegro (A minor -> C major)
4. Finale: Presto (E minor)

=== I. Allegro ma non troppo ===
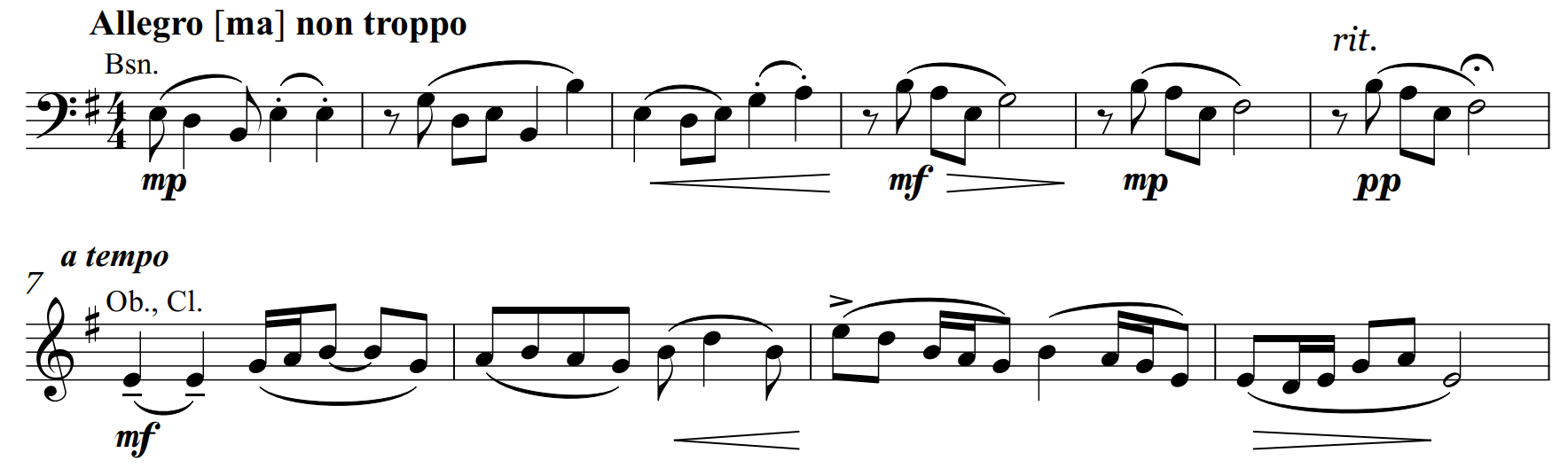

The first movement is written in a sonata form, with deviations in the recapitulation. The main themes of the exposition are predominantly based on the pentatonic scales of E minor and G major. Following the development section, a traditional recapitulation of the opening material is declined, and instead the themes are fragmented and combined to bring the movement to a striking close.

=== II. Largo, maestoso ===
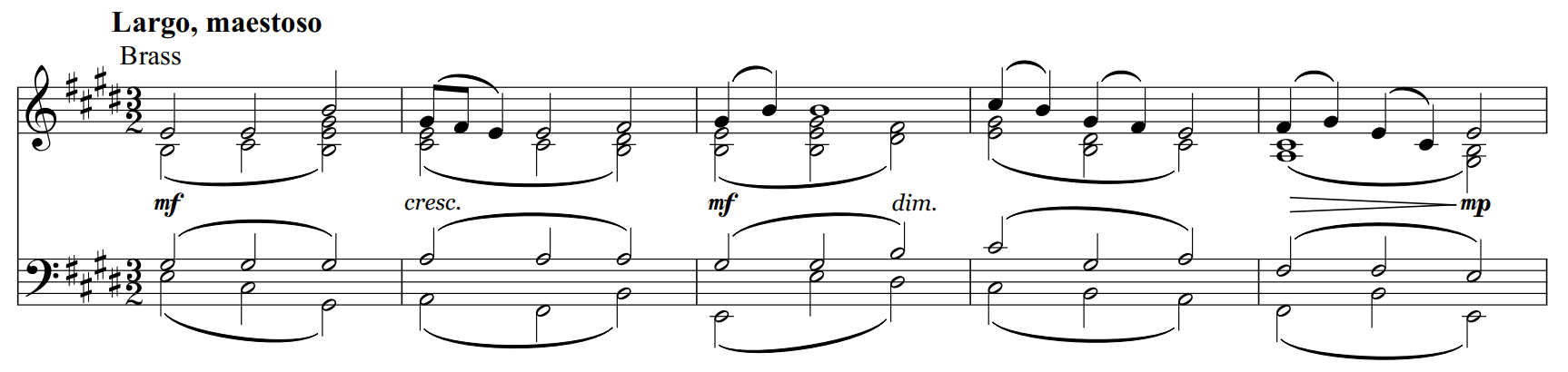

The second movement opens with a hymn-like theme played by a brass choir. The theme is composed in the verse-refrain form and features interjections by the flutes and clarinets. A contrasting section in C♯ minor marked Poco più mosso functions as an interlude between statements of the hymn theme. After a long developmental section, the hymn theme returns again, this time decorated with a clarinet obbligato and cathedral chimes. The movement comes to a gentle close on an E major chord played by the strings.

=== III. Juba Dance: Allegro ===
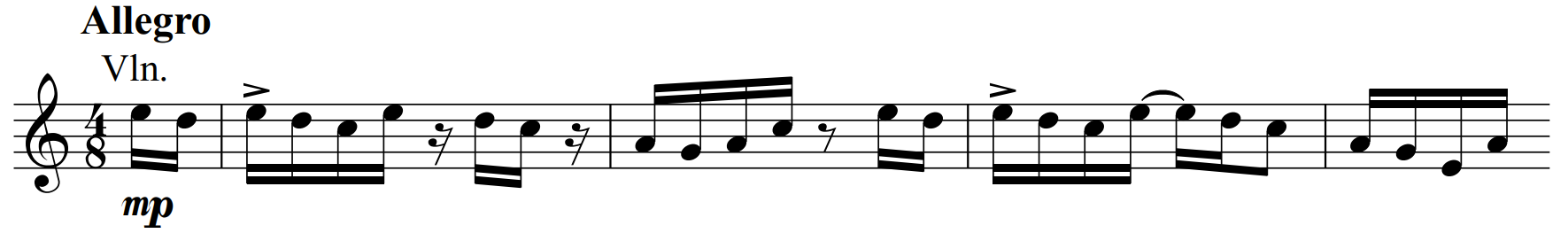

In this movement Price evokes the musical accompaniment to the Afro-American Juba dance, an American derivation of the African Djouba and the Caribbean Majumba dances. This type of dance music features the use of lively body percussion and upbeat melodies played on the fiddle. The spirit of this dance is captured in the opening bars with the syncopated pentatonic melody in the violins, the pizzicato ‘oom-pah’ accompaniment in the lower strings, and the inclusions of the African drums, replacing the body percussion. This movement is in Rondo form.

=== IV. Finale: Presto ===
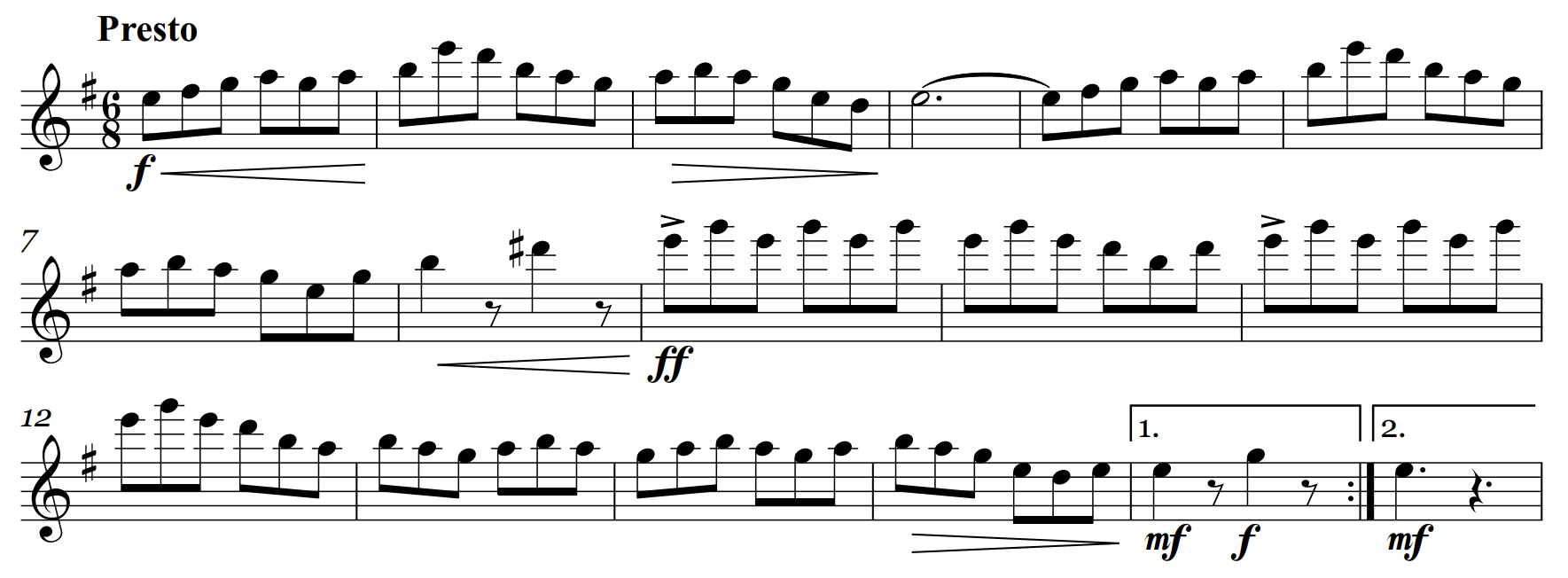

The stormy main theme of the final movement is in E minor and uses the whole orchestra. The movement is written in a loose rondo form, with repetitions of the main theme broken up by calmer passages with reduced orchestration and texture. The movement builds to a frantic prestissimo coda which brings the work to a dramatic close.

== Reception ==
The initial critical response to the symphony was positive. Eugene Stinson wrote about the work in the Chicago daily News: “It is a faultless work … a work that speaks its own message with restraint and yet with passion. Mrs. Price's symphony is worthy of a place in the regular symphonic repertoire.” However, the work has since fallen into relative obscurity. In 2012, Bob McQuiston of NPR called it "an early American symphony worthy of being rediscovered." He further remarked:

The opening movement has melodies and rhythms typically found in Afro-American folk music, and recalls Dvorák's New World Symphony, while the following slow movement features a moving hymn tune of Price's design. Both concluding movements are fast and return to the juba dance concept. They contain hints of fiddles and banjos, antic slide whistle effects, and a recurring three-against-two melody which end this loveable work on a whimsical note.

== See also ==
- Symphony No. 3 (Price)
- Symphony No. 4 (Price)
