= Rae Linda Brown =

American musicologist (1953–2017)

- Born: October 7, 1953; Hartford, Connecticut, US
- Died: August 20, 2017 (aged 63) Seattle, US
- Occupation: Musicologist

Rae Linda Brown (October 7, 1953 – August 20, 2017) was an American musicologist whose researched centered on American classical music, particularly that of African Americans. Brown authored landmark books on Florence Price and William Grant Still.

== Life and career ==
Rae Linda Brown was born on October 7, 1953, and grew up in Hartford Connecticut and earned degrees at the University of Connecticut and Yale University. Some of Brown's graduate work at Yale catalogued sheet music and scores in the James Weldon Johnson memorial collection at the Beinecke Rare Book & Manuscript Library and comprises Volume 23 of the Garland Critical Studies on Black Life and Culture.

Brown's 1987 dissertation focused on composer Florence Price. Throughout the 1980s, 1990s and 2000s Brown rediscovered, edited, and published critical analyses of Florence Price's music. Brown's work in this area became the basis for a wider recognition of Price's role in and contribution to American music. This recognition contributed to the discovery of previously unknown scores that are now housed at the University of Arkansas.

Brown was a professor at the University of Michigan and The University of California, Irvine. While at Irvine, Brown served as the Robert and Marjorie Rawlins Chair of the Department of Music, oversaw the completion of a new building for the department, the development of new academic programs in jazz, and the creation of a doctoral program in Integrated Composition, Improvisation, and Technology. From 2008 to 2015 Brown was the Vice President for Undergraduate Education at Loyola Marymount University; from 2016 until her death Brown was the Provost and Senior Vice President for Academic Affairs at Pacific Lutheran University. In 2017 Brown received the inaugural Willis C. Patterson Research Award for her work in the area of African-American Art Song.

As a professor and administrator, Brown led the creation of new academic programs at the University of California, Irvine, Loyola Marymount University, and Pacific Lutheran University.
