= Symphony No. 4 (Price) =

Symphony by Florence Price

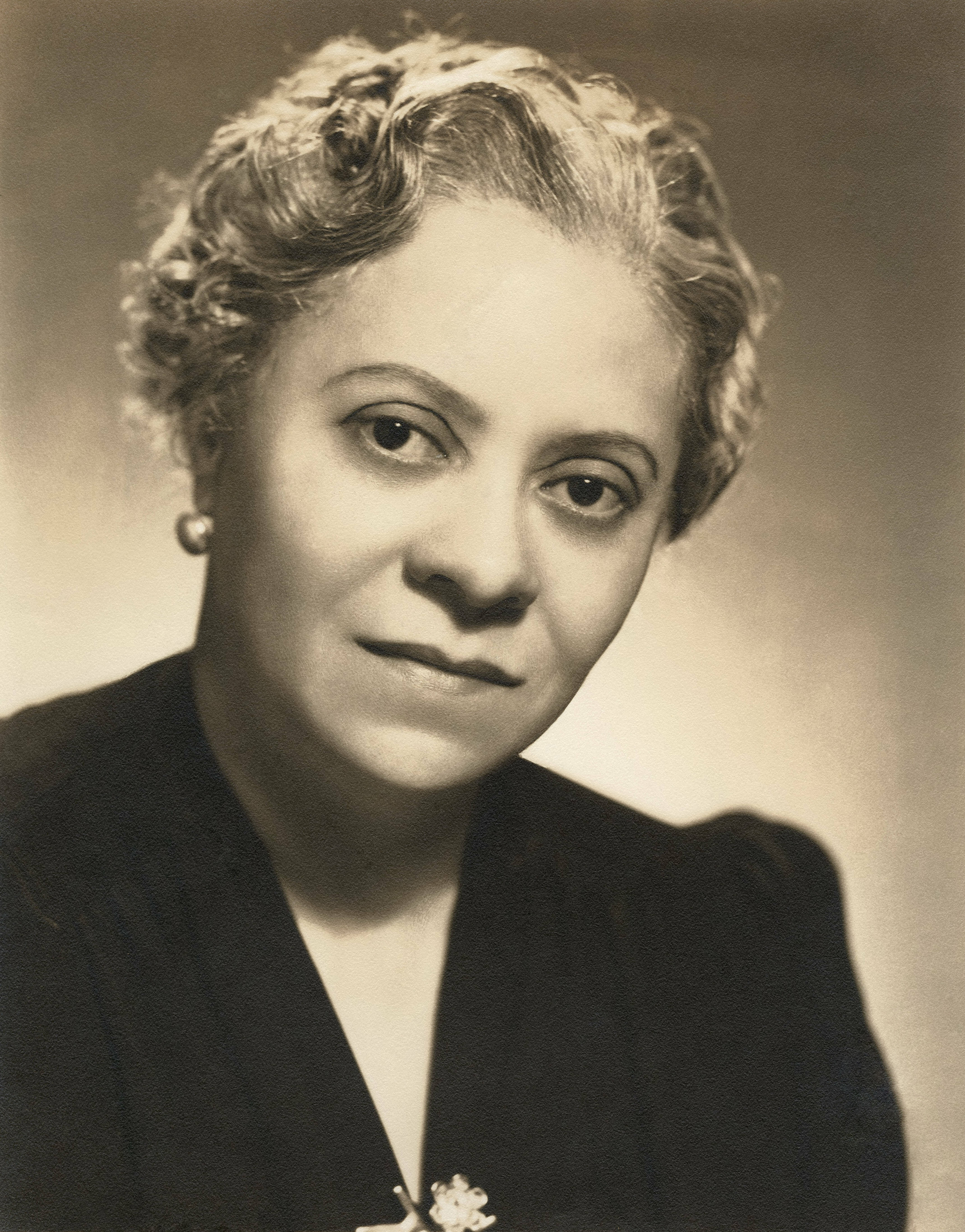
Price, date unknown

The Symphony No. 4 in D minor is an orchestral symphony by the American composer Florence Price. It was composed in 1945, but she never heard the work premiered in her lifetime.

The symphony was presumed lost until 2009, when a substantial collection of manuscripts, papers, and other documents related to Price's works and life were found in her former summer home outside of St. Anne, Illinois. This archive is now preserved at the University of Arkansas. The symphony was given a belated world premiere by the Fort Smith Symphony under the direction of John Jeter in Fort Smith, Arkansas, on May 12, 2018. The work has received numerous performances by a variety of ensembles, such as professional, collegiate, youth, and high school orchestras, since its discovery and premiere.

== Music ==
The symphony is scored for a large orchestra consisting of piccolo, three flutes, two oboes, cor anglais, two clarinets, bass clarinet, two bassoons, four horns, three trumpets, two trombones, bass trombone, tuba, timpani, two percussionists, celesta, harp, and strings.

The symphony has a duration of approximately 32 minutes in performance and is cast in four movements:

1. Tempo moderato
2. Andante cantabile
3. Juba: Allegro
4. Scherzo: Allegro

The first movement is the longest, typically lasting just over 15 minutes. The remaining three movements are considerably shorter, each lasting around 5 minutes.

=== I. Tempo Moderato ===
The first movement of the symphony follows a typical sonata form, including an introduction and a coda. Harmonically, it is rooted in D minor but explores various modes and related tonal areas, which was a conventional compositional practice within Price's notable Neo-Romantic style. The spiritual "Wade in the Water" is incorporated throughout the piece, first introduced by the trumpets in the statement of the primary theme. The theme primarily utilizes a pentatonic scale, which was "the most frequently used scale in Afro-American folksongs." Her themes are developed via transposition, alteration, and harmonic modulation. The recapitulation explores most of the themes in the parallel major (D), while maintaining the hints of mode mixture present in the original melody. The coda appears in cut time, the only metric change of the movement, and steadily plants the finale of the piece into D minor after harmonic exploration.

=== II. Andante cantabile ===
The form of the second movement is considered an arch form. Price quotes her own Fantasie for E minor for Piano within the theme for this movement, which she notes is "not a folk song (or Spiritual) or any part of either, as was thought by some when it was first heard in the Fantasie. It is entirely original."

=== III. Juba: Allegro ===
The third movement uses a simple ternary form and is styled after a Juba, a style of dance known for its stomping, clapping, and complex rhythms. The Juba replaced the traditional menuet/scherzo third movement in each of Price's three surviving symphonies. "The melodic line features highly syncopated rhythms over a steady bass line, similar to those found in ragtime."

=== IV. Scherzo: Allegro ===
The final movement of Price's final symphony was written in a Rondo form, and its themes are reminiscent of a tarantella. The movement uses a compound duple meter, so that the larger pulses are subdivided into three beats rather than two, implying a differentiated triple dance in comparison to the duple syncopations of the third movement's juba.

== Reception ==
The symphony has been praised by modern music critics as a forgotten entry in American classical music. Patrick Rucker of Gramophone wrote, "Her handling of the orchestra is idiomatic and strikingly original, with solos generously allocated throughout the ensemble." He added, "The introduction or, more appropriately, restoration of Price's unique voice is unquestionably an enrichment of the American symphonic canon." Reviewing the symphony on album with Price's First Symphony, Phillip Scott of Limelight compared the music favorably to that of Price's contemporary William Grant Still and wrote, "While there is a deliberate Negro spiritual strain in her melodies, the most individual movements are the Scherzos. In both works they are a Juba: a syncopated stamping dance that was a precursor to ragtime. Price brilliantly captures its joyous enthusiasm, integrating it into European symphonic form. Elsewhere she taps into an Ivesian Americana (as in the First Symphony's hymn-like Largo). Price was the real thing, and these performances in excellent sound do her proud."

== Recording ==
A recording of the world premiere performance by John Jeter and the Fort Smith Symphony was released on album with Price's Symphony No. 1 by Naxos Records in January 2019. This recording is part of an incomplete larger project to record all four of Price’s symphonies.

== See also ==
- Symphony No. 1 (Price)
- Symphony No. 3 (Price)
