= Unsung: A History of Women in American Music =

1980 non-fiction book by Christine Ammer

- First edition
- Author: Christine Ammer
- Language: English
- Series: Contributions in Women's Studies no. 14
- Subject: Women in music
- Publisher: Greenwood Press, Amadeus Press
- Publication date: 1980, 2001
- Publication place: United States
- Media type: Print
- Pages: 317, 382
- ISBN: 9780313229091
- OCLC: 5289380

Unsung: A History of Women in American Music is a non-fiction book written by Christine Ammer about the subject of women in music and was first published in 1980 with a second edition published in 2001. The book covers approximately 200 years of American women's involvement in music. Unsung has become a "standard text" for the subject of American women in music.

Unsung covers many aspects of women in music with the exception of singers, due to the author's assertion that they do not experience the same level of gender discrimination as other endeavors women pursue in music, such as conducting or composing. Unsung discusses this sexism that many women face during their musical careers, especially in the world of classical music and academia.

== First edition ==
Ammer wrote the first edition of Unsung because there was a lack of material about women in music at the time. When Unsung was first published in 1980 it was considered "a pioneering volume at a time when women in music was a fledgling area located at the margins of musicology," according to Music & Letters. Not only did the first edition of Unsung bring attention to women's roles in music, but also helped music from the United States gain "scholarly legitimacy." Library Journal praised the first addition for its accessible prose and for the information about living composers "available nowhere else."

== Second edition ==
The second edition contains much of the same work as the original, with the additions of women's contributions to jazz and popular music. Other changes include the additions of women involved in electronic music, music for film, performance art, and "international fusion."

== Criticism ==
Library Journal felt that the title was somewhat negative, saying that "many of these fine musicians have been widely acclaimed."
