= Florence Price =

American composer (1887/88–1953)

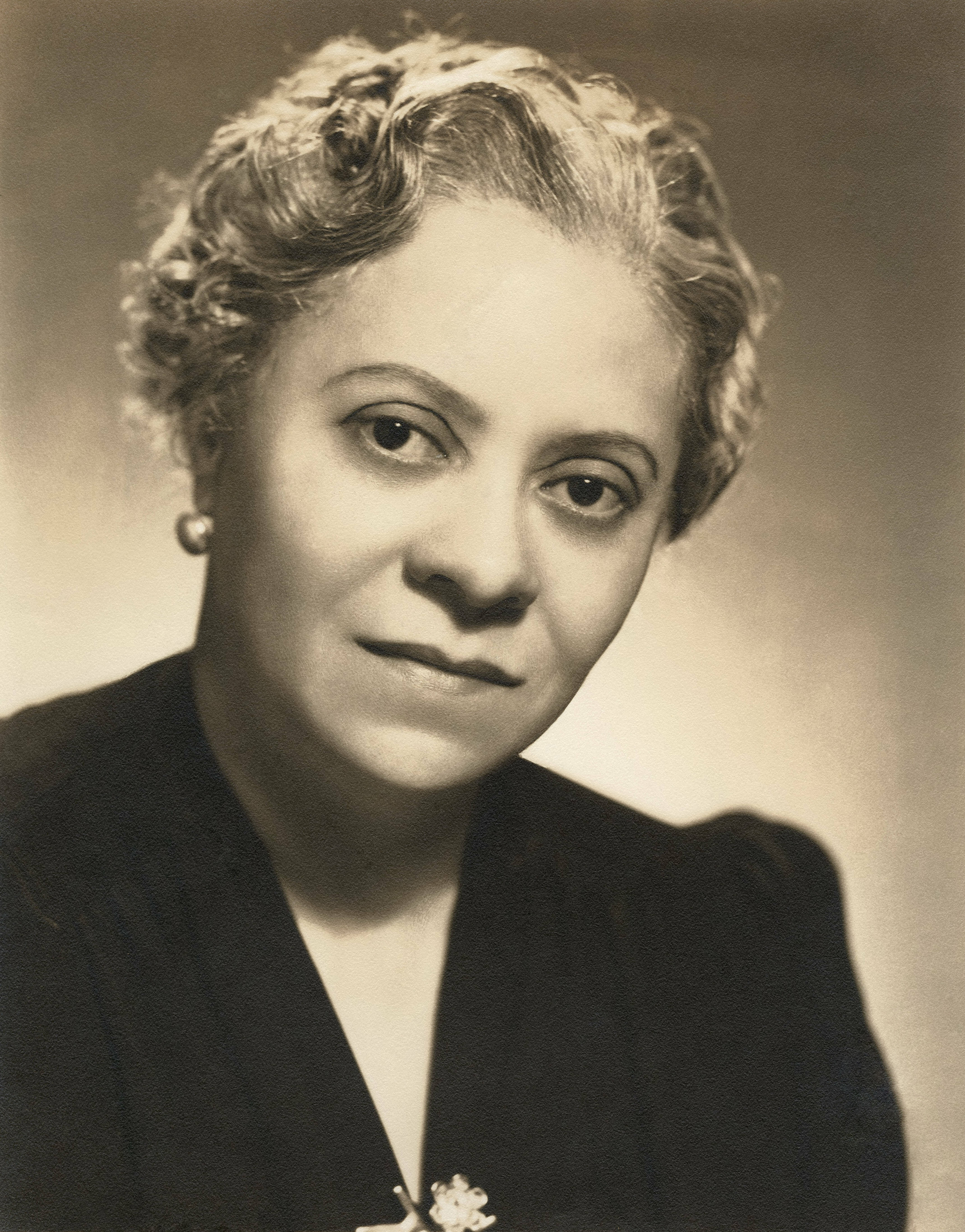
- Price, date unknown
- Born: Florence Beatrice Smith; April 9, 1887; Little Rock, Arkansas, U.S.
- Died: June 3, 1953 (aged 66); Chicago, Illinois, U.S.
- Occupations: Musical composer; pianist; organist; music teacher
- Years active: 1899–1952
- Spouses: Thomas J. Price (m. 1912; div. 1931) Pusey Dell Arnett (m. 1931; sep. 1934)
- Children: 3

Florence Beatrice Price (née Smith; April 9, 1887/88 – June 3, 1953) was an American classical composer, pianist, organist, and music teacher. Born in Little Rock, Arkansas, Price was educated at the New England Conservatory of Music, and was active in Chicago from 1927 until her death in 1953. Price is noted as the first African-American woman to be recognized as a symphonic composer, and the first to have a composition played by a major orchestra. Price composed over 300 works: four symphonies, four concertos, as well as choral works, art songs, chamber music, and music for solo instruments. In 2009, a substantial collection of her works and papers was found in her abandoned summer home.

== Biography ==
=== Early life and education ===
Florence Beatrice Smith was born to Florence (Gulliver) and James H. Smith on April 9, 1887 or 1888, in Little Rock, Arkansas, one of three children in a mixed-race family. Her father was the only African-American dentist in the city, and her mother was a music teacher who guided Florence's early musical training. Despite racial issues of the era, her family was well respected and did well within their community. She took piano lessons from her mother at the age of three and gave her first piano performance at age four; her first composition was published at age 11.

She attended school at a Catholic convent, and in 1901, at age 14, she graduated as valedictorian of her class. In 1903, she enrolled in the New England Conservatory of Music in Boston, Massachusetts, with a double major in piano pedagogy and organ performance. Initially, she passed as Mexican to avoid racial discrimination against African Americans, listing her hometown as "Pueblo, Mexico". At the Conservatory, she studied composition and counterpoint with composers George Chadwick and Frederick Converse. Also while there, Smith wrote her first string trio and symphony. She graduated in 1906 with honors, and with both an artist diploma in organ and a teaching certificate.

=== Career ===
In 1910, Smith returned to Arkansas, where she taught briefly before moving to Atlanta, Georgia. There she became the head of the music department of Clark University, a historically Black college which is now called "Clark Atlanta University". In 1912, she married Thomas J. Price, a lawyer. She gave up her teaching position and moved back to Little Rock, Arkansas, where he had his practice and had two daughters. She could not find work in what was, by then, a racially segregated town.

After a series of racial incidents in Little Rock, particularly a lynching of a Black man in 1927, the Price family decided to leave. Like many Black families living in the Deep South, they moved north in the Great Migration to escape Jim Crow conditions, and settled in Chicago, a major industrial city.

According to her daughter, Florence really wanted to be a doctor but felt the difficulties of becoming a woman doctor at the time were too formidable. Instead, she became that even greater rarity—a woman composer of symphonies.

There Florence Price began a new and fulfilling period in her composition career; she was part of the Chicago Black Renaissance. She studied composition, orchestration, and organ with the leading teachers in the city, including Arthur Olaf Andersen, Carl Busch, Wesley La Violette, and Leo Sowerby. She published four pieces for piano in 1928. While in Chicago, Price was at various times enrolled at the Chicago Musical College, Chicago Teacher's College, University of Chicago, and American Conservatory of Music, studying languages and liberal arts subjects as well as music.

In 1930, an important early success occurred at the twelfth annual convention of the National Association of Negro Musicians (NANM), when pianist-composer Margaret Bonds premiered Price's Fantasie nègre [No. 1] (1929) in its original version titled "Negro Fantasy". Of this performance, Carl Ditton wrote for the Associated Negro Press:

The surprise of the evening was a most effective composition by Mrs. F. B. Price, entitled 'A Negro Phantasy', played by the talented Chicago pianiste, Margaret Bonds. The entire association [i.e., NANM] could well afford to recommend this number to all advanced pianists.

In 1931, financial struggles and abuse by her husband resulted in Price getting a divorce at age 44. She became a single mother to her two daughters. To make ends meet, she worked as an organist for silent film screenings and composed songs for radio ads under a pen name. During this time, Price lived with friends. She eventually moved in with her student and friend, Margaret Bonds, also a Black pianist and composer. This friendship connected Price with writer Langston Hughes and contralto Marian Anderson, both prominent figures in the art world who aided in Price's future success as a composer. Together, Price and Bonds began to achieve national recognition for their compositions and performances.

In 1932, both Price and Bonds submitted compositions for the Wanamaker Foundation Awards. Price won first prize with her Symphony in E minor, and third for her Piano Sonata, earning her a $500 prize. (Bonds came in first place in the song category, with a song entitled "Sea Ghost".) Early in 1933 leading Arts advocate Maude Roberts George, president of the Chicago Music Association, music critic of The Chicago Defender and eventual national president of the National Association of Negro Musicians, paid $250 (about $5,093 in 2021 dollars) for Price's First Symphony to be included in a program devoted to "The Negro in Music", with the Chicago Symphony Orchestra, conducted by Frederick Stock, as part of the Century of Progress World's Fair. Although this concert, like the Fair in general, was unmistakably tainted by the racism that characterized Chicago and the U.S. in general in the 1930s, George's underwriting made Price the first African-American woman to have her music played by a major U.S. orchestra. Later in that same season the Illinois Host House of the World's Fair devoted an entire program to Price and her music, a striking invitation given that Price had adopted Illinois as her home state only five years earlier.

In 1934, Price represented her class at the Chicago Musical College, performing her Concerto in D minor for Piano and Orchestra as part of the 1934 commencement program. This performance was met with critical acclaim. She would go on to perform this Concerto at the National Association of Negro Musicians in Pittsburgh, gaining further critical praise from The Pittsburgh Press and the Pittsburgh Sun Telegraph. The Telegraph specifically praised Price's blending of her African American culture into her work, calling it "real American music."

During the 1930s, a number of Price's other orchestral works were played by the Works Progress Administration Symphony Orchestra of Detroit and the Women's Symphony Orchestra of Chicago. On October 12, 1934, the Women's Symphony Orchestra of Chicago, a well known orchestra which uplifted women composers and performers, performed the Concerto. This began a long term association between the orchestra and Price. This partnership helped Price to gain recognition, and her Concerto in D minor would go on to be performed by other major symphonies within her lifetime, including the Chicago symphony and the Michigan Works Progress Administration Orchestra.

In 1940, Price was the first African-American woman inducted into the American Society of Composers, Authors, and Publishers (ASCAP) for her work as a composer, a process that took six years since she contacted composer John Alden Carpenter about the requirements for becoming a member of ASCAP.

In 1949, Price published two of her spiritual arrangements, "I Am Bound for the Kingdom", and "I'm Workin' on My Buildin'", and dedicated them to Marian Anderson, who performed them on a regular basis.

=== Personal life ===
In 1912, Price married prominent Arkansas attorney Thomas J. Price (also known as John Gray Lucas) upon returning to Arkansas from Atlanta. Together, they had two daughters and a son: Florence (d. 1975), Edith (d. 1963), and Thomas Jr (d. 1920). The Price children were raised in Chicago.

Florence Price divorced Thomas Price in January 1931, and on February 14, 1931, she married the widower Pusey Dell Arnett (1875–1957), an insurance agent and former baseball player for the Chicago Unions some thirteen years her senior. She and Arnett were separated by April 1934; they apparently never divorced.

On June 3, 1953, Price died from a stroke in Chicago, Illinois, at the age of 66.

== Legacy and honors ==
Price Elementary School, Chicago

In 1964, the Chicago Public Schools opened Florence B. Price Elementary School (also known as Price Lit & Writing Elementary School) at 4351 South Drexel Boulevard in the North Kenwood neighborhood of Chicago, Illinois in her honor. Price Elementary's student body was predominately African-American. The school operated from 1964 until the school district decided to phase it out in 2011 due to poor academic performance, which ultimately led to its closing in 2013. The school housed a piano owned by Price. The school building currently houses a local church as of 2019. In February 2019, The University of Arkansas Honors College held a concert honoring Price. In October 2019, the International Florence Price Festival announced that its inaugural gathering celebrating Price's music and legacy would take place at the University of Maryland School of Music in August 2020. From January 4 to 8, 2021, Price was the BBC Radio 3's Composer of the Week.

Following her death, much of her work was overshadowed as new musical styles emerged that fit the changing tastes of modern society. According to some critics, Florence Price's Symphony in E minor, performed by the Chicago Symphony Orchestra in 1933, represented a pivotal moment in American classical music, breaking the race barrier for African American composers in major symphonic venues. Price's achievement paved the way for greater representation, acceptance, and visibility of African American artistry within the classical music tradition, expanding opportunities for artists who had previously faced systemic exclusion from mainstream orchestras and concert halls.

Some of her work was lost, but as more African-American and female composers gained attention for their works, so did Price. In 2001, the Women's Philharmonic created an album of some of her work. In 2011, pianist Karen Walwyn and The New Black Repertory Ensemble performed Price's Concerto in One Movement and Symphony in E minor.

In February 2025, a crater on the planet Mercury was named in her honor. In that same month, pianist Michelle Cann and soprano Karen Slack won best classical solo vocal album at the 2025 Grammys for their recording Beyond The Years: Unpublished Songs Of Florence Price.

On January 31, 2026, My Name is Florence, had its world premiere in St. Paul, Minnesota. A Minnesota Opera New Works Initiative production, it is a collaboration between librettist Harrison David Rivers and composer B.E. Boykin. It "presents vignettes from Price's life that bring into focus the impact of family, legacy, and the transformative power of a seat at the piano."

=== Discovery of manuscripts in 2009 ===
In 2009, a substantial collection of her works and papers was found in an abandoned dilapidated house on the outskirts of St. Anne, Illinois, which Price had used as a summer home. These consisted of dozens of her scores, including her two violin concertos and her fourth symphony. As Alex Ross stated in The New Yorker in February 2018, "not only did Price fail to enter the canon; a large quantity of her music came perilously close to obliteration. That run-down house in St. Anne is a potent symbol of how a country can forget its cultural history." Three settings of her work Abraham Lincoln Walks at Midnight were rediscovered in 2009; a setting for orchestra, organ, chorus, and soloists was premiered on April 12, 2019, by the Du Bois Orchestra and Lyricora Chamber Choir in Cambridge, Massachusetts.

In November 2018, the music publisher G. Schirmer announced that it had acquired the exclusive worldwide rights to Florence Price's complete catalog. In 2021, classical pianist Lara Downes initiated a project, Rising Sun Music, to draw attention to the influence of composers from a diversity of backgrounds upon American Classical music, assisted by producers such as Adam Abeshouse, to release newly recorded works of composers such as Price and Harry Burleigh, whose importance often has been lost in historical accounts of the development in the field.

With the 2022 installment in the Catalyst Quartet's ongoing Uncovered series focusing on the music of Black composers comes nearly two hours' worth of Price's chamber music. "The most substantial piece, Price's A-minor Quintet for Piano and Strings got its first recording just last year, courtesy of the Kaleidoscope Chamber Collective. Like that one, this performance impresses for its technical and expressive excellence: everything's beautifully balanced and comes to life just as it should." Also from artsfuse.org's Jonathan Blumhofer: "Taken together, this is an album that's at once musically significant but, more than that, thoroughly enjoyable. How tragic that, largely on account of her race and gender, Price's music was almost erased. Yet how happy it is that revivals do happen – and how exciting that, thanks to the advocacy of groups like the Catalysts and musicians like [Michelle] Cann, we're seeing a deserving composer finally taking her place in the American canon."

=== Reception ===
Price was well received during her time, and she was particularly celebrated in Chicago. However, even her positive reviews were influenced by the common belief of the time that many women were performers, and a woman composer was a novelty. As a result, several of Price's reviews focused more on her performing abilities than her compositional skills.

She was cognizant of these issues. When writing to a composer she admired, Price prefaced her work with, "I have two handicaps - those of sex and race." She addressed these facts upfront in order to request a review of her work that was free of sexism or racism. Despite these challenges, Price received praise for the blending of both her traditional western education and African American culture in her music, and was seen as a pioneer for both her gender and race.

== Works ==
=== Composition style ===
Even though her training was steeped in European tradition, Price's music is in an American idiom. The strong influence of the composition style of Antonín Dvořák is often noticeable, as in her first violin concerto and more broadly in the two composers' lavish orchestrations of reworked folk melodies. (This claim is complicated by the fact that Dvořák in turn was heavily influenced by African-American spirituals.) As a Christian, she frequently used the music of the African-American church as material for her arrangements. At the urging of her mentor, George Whitefield Chadwick, Price began to incorporate elements of African-American spirituals, emphasizing the rhythm and syncopation of the spirituals rather than just using the text. The melody in her first symphony was inspired by African-American spirituals, yet solidly rooted in instrumental writing. Compared with Dvorak's 9th symphony, the third movement is titled Juba Dance. This antebellum folk dance had already inspired European art music composers in its later manifestation the cakewalk, such as Debussy's "Golliwogg's Cakewalk" in Children's Corner (1908).

Florence Price composed numerous works: four symphonies, four concertos, as well as choral works, art songs, and music for chamber and solo instruments, organ anthems, piano pieces, spiritual arrangements, a piano concerto, and two violin concertos. In the program notes for her piano piece Three Little Negro Dances, Price wrote: "In all types of Negro music, rhythm is of preeminent importance. In the dance, it is a compelling, onward-sweeping force that tolerates no interruption... All phases of truly Negro activity—whether work or play, singing or praying—are more than apt to take on a rhythmic quality."

== Discography ==
Selected recordings of compositions by Florence Price
Year	Album	Performers	Label
1987	Althea Waites Performs the Piano Music of Florence Price"	Althea Waites	Cambria Records
1993	Art Songs by American Composers	Yolanda Marcoulescou-Stern	Gasparo Records
1993	Black Diamonds	Althea Waites	Cambria Records
1997	Chicago Renaissance Woman: Florence B. Price Organ Works	Calvert Johnson	Calcante CAL 014
1997	Here's One [Music for Violin and Piano by American Composers] (The Deserted Garden)	Zina Schiff; violin; Cameron Grant; piano	4-Tay Inc. 4TAY-CD-4005
2000	Negro Speaks of Rivers	Odekhiren Amaize; David Korevaar	Musician's Showcase
2001	Florence Price: The Oak; Mississippi River Suite; and Symphony No. 3 / Women's Philharmonic	Apo Hsu; Women's Philharmonic	Koch International Classics
2006	Lucille Field Sings Songs by American Women Composers	Lucille Field	Cambria Records
2011	Florence B. Price: Concerto in One Movement and Symphony in E minor	Leslie B Dunner; Karen Walwyn; New Black Repertory Ensemble	Albany TROY1295
2013	Piano Phantoms (The Goblin and the Mosquito)	Michael Lewin; piano	Sono Luminus DSL-92168
2018	Florence B. Price: Violin Concertos Nos. 1 (D major – 1939) and 2 (D minor – 1952)	Er-Gene Kahng; Janacek Philharmonic; Ryan Cockerham	Albany TROY1706
2018	Florence B. Price: Symphonies Nos. 1 (E minor – 1932) and 4 (D minor – 1945)	Fort Smith Symphony; John Jeter	Naxos American Classics
2019	Florence Price: The Deserted Garden (1933) and Elfentanz (undated)	Dawn Wohn; violin and Esther Park; piano	Perspectives; Delos Music DE 3547
2019	Florence B. Price: Dances in the Canebrakes (Nimble Feet / Tropical Noon / Silk Hat and Walking Cane)	arranged by William Grant Still (1895–1978) for orchestra / Chicago Sinfonietta; Mei-Ann Chen	Album Project W – Works by Woman Composers Cedille Records
2019	Beyond the Traveler: Piano Music by Composers from Arkansas (Sonata in E minor)	Cole Burger; piano	MSR Classics
2020	Florence Price: Symphony No. 3 and Concert Overture No. 1	BBC National Orchestra of Wales; Michael Seal; BBC Symphony Orchestra; Valentina Peleggi	BBC Music Magazine BBCMM454
2020	Pioneers: Piano Works by Female Composers (Piano Sonata in E minor: II. Andante)	Hiroko Ishimoto; piano	Grand Piano; HNH International GP844
2021	Florence Price: Symphonies Nos. 1 & 3	Philadelphia Orchestra and Yannick Nézet-Séguin	Deutsche Grammophon
2021	American Quintets: Amy Beach; Florence Price; Samuel Barber (Quintet; c. 1935)	Kaleidoscope Chamber Collective	Chandos CHAN 20224
2021	Florence Beatrice Price: Symphony No. 3 in C minor (1940); The Mississippi River (1934); Ethiopia's Shadow in America (1932)	ORF Vienna Radio Symphony Orchestra; John Jeter	Naxos 8 559897
2021	Florence Price – Virtuoso and Poet	Alan Morrison; organ	ACA Digital Recordings; Inc. CM 20132
2022	Uncovered, Vol. 2: Florence B. Price	Catalyst Quartet; Michelle Cann, piano	Azica Records
2023	Wander-Thirst: The Choral Music of Florence Price	University of Arkansas Schola Cantorum; Dr. Stephen Caldwell	Hill Records
2024	Beyond the Years: Unpublished Songs of Florence Price	Karen Slack; soprano & Michelle Cann; piano	Azica Records
2025	Florence Beatrice Price: Violin Concertos Nos. 1 and 2, Piano Concerto in One Movement, Dances in the Canebreaks	Fanny Clamagirand, violin); Han Chen, piano; Malmö Opera Orchestra, cond. John Jeter	Naxos 8.559952

== Adaptations ==
=== Orchestral works ===
- Adoration (1951/2024), arranged for orchestra by Kai Johannes Polzhofer
- Rainbow Waltz : The Vienna Philharmonic Orchestra announced that it had performed an orchestral arrangement of its Rainbow Waltz, arranged by Wolfgang Dörner. However, this arrangement raises questions due to its lack of similarities with the original piano piece, leaving unanswered questions raised by the publishers who hold the rights to the score.

== See also ==
- William Grant Still

== Additional sources ==
- Ammer, Christine. Unsung: A History of Women in American Music. Portland Oregon, Amadeus Press, 2001
- Brown, Rae Linda (2001). "Price [née Smith], Florence Bea(trice)". Grove Music Online (8th ed.). Oxford University Press. doi:10.1093/omo/9781561592630.013.90000367402. ISBN 978-1-56159-263-0. (subscription, Wikilibrary access, or UK public library membership required)
- Brown, Rae Linda. "William Grant Still, Florence Price, and William Dawson: Echoes of the Harlem Renaissance", in Samuel A. Floyd, Jr (ed.), Black Music in the Harlem Renaissance, Knoxville: University of Tennessee Press, 1990, pp. 71–86.
- Ege, Samantha. "Florence Price and the Politics of Her Existence", Kapralova Society Journal 16, no. 1 (Spring 2018): 1–10.
- "Florence Beatrice Smith Price", Biography.com. Retrieved December 1, 2014.
- Mashego, Shana Thomas. Music from the Soul of Woman: The Influence of the African American Presbyterian and Methodist Traditions on the Classical Compositions of Florence Price and Dorothy Rudd Moore. DMA, The University of Arizona, 2010.
- Perkins, Holly Ellistine. Biographies of Black Composers and Songwriters; A Supplementary Textbook. Iowa: Wm. C. Brown Publishers, 1990.
- "Price, Florence Beatrice", Encyclopedia of World Biography. 2006. Encyclopedia.com. December 1, 2014.
- Slonimsky, Nicolas (ed.) (1994), The Concise Edition of Baker's Biographical Dictionary of Musicians, 8th edn, New York: Schirmer, p. 791.
