= Yukon Women In Music =

The Yukon Women In Music (YWIM) is a non-profit society that promotes Yukon-based women musicians founded in 1998. Each year the organization sponsors numerous musical events and workshops. In summer of 2016, the organization sponsored the "Cook Shack Sessions" throughout the Yukon Territory. In September 2016, members of the group performed in French as part of the YWIM chante en Francais.

In 2008, the group sponsored a recorded album, Tether Hooks & Velcro which was also featured on MTV. In 2012, the society's fourth album was featured on CBC's Air Play. In 2013, the Yukon Government awarded seven artists $25,000 in funding to record new music

== Notable artists ==
Members of the Yukon Women In Music (YWIM) have included such notable artists as Kim Beggs, Fawn Fritzen, Nicole Edwards, BJ MacLean, and Jenna Marie Bourgeois

== Discography ==
- Song Rise, 2012
- Tether Hooks & Velcro, 2008
- YWIM Compilation CD, 2004
- Ancient Wisdom, 2000
