= List of gay men's choruses =

There are gay men's choruses in many cities, including:

== Canada ==
- Vancouver Men's Chorus

== Norway ==
- Oslo Fagottkor

== United Kingdom ==
- London Gay Men's Chorus
- Brighton Gay Men's Chorus.

== United States ==
There are nearly 200 TTBB queer choruses in the United States who are members of GALA Choruses.

- Atlanta Gay Men's Chorus
- Boston Gay Men's Chorus
- Chicago Gay Men's Chorus
- Columbus Gay Men's Chorus
- Connecticut Gay Men's Chorus
- Gay Men's Chorus of Los Angeles
- Gay Men's Chorus of San Diego
- Gay Men's Chorus of Washington, D.C.
- Hartford Gay Men's Chorus
- Heartland Men's Chorus (Kansas City, MO)
- Indianapolis Men's Chorus
- New Hampshire Gay Men's Chorus
- New York City Gay Men's Chorus
- Oakland Gay Men's Chorus
- Orlando Gay Chorus
- Philadelphia Gay Men's Chorus
- Portland Gay Men's Chorus
- San Diego Men's Chorus
- San Francisco Gay Men's Chorus
- Seattle Men's Chorus
- Turtle Creek Chorale
- Twin Cities Gay Men's Chorus
