= PGMC =

PGMC may refer to:

- Philadelphia Gay Men's Chorus
- Portland Gay Men's Chorus
- Proto-Germanic language (PGmc)
