= Seattle Women's Chorus =

- Choir
- Origin: Seattle, Washington, U.S.
- Founded: 2002; 24 years ago
- Music director: Paul Caldwell
- Affiliation: Gay and Lesbian Association of Choruses
- Website: Official website

Seattle Women's Chorus (SWC) is a community chorus based in Seattle, Washington. Founded in 2002, the group is the largest LGBTQ-identified women's chorus in the world. SWC is a member of the Gay and Lesbian Association of Choruses (GALA Choruses) and Chorus America. Both Seattle Women's Chorus and Seattle Men's Chorus are governed by the same non-profit organization, Flying House Productions. Combined, they are the largest community chorus in North America.

SWC has been led by conductor and artistic director, Paul Caldwell, since 2016. In 2019, Nikki Blackmer was named Assistant Conductor.

== Performances ==
SWC regularly performs for audiences in Seattle at venues including Benaroya Hall, Cornish Playhouse, Saint Mark's Cathedral, and McCaw Hall. They have been joined by guest artists including country singer, Chely Wright, Lesley Gore, VEEP's Kathy Najimy, The Voice's Vicci Martinez and Sarah Rudinoff.

In addition to concerts for adult audiences, SWC has performed free children's concert for Seattle-area families. This event has featured youth performance groups including Village Theatre KIDSTAGE and Diverse Harmony, the nation's first gay-straight alliance youth chorus.

== Marriage equality ==
In 2012, SWC, along with Seattle Men's Chorus, traveled to five cities in western Washington, performing a free concert, "Voices United for Marriage," that encouraged residents to approve state referendum 74 which would legalize marriage for same-sex couples. In November 2012, Washington became one of three states, along with Maine and Maryland, to approve same-sex marriage through a popular vote. Pete-e Petersen and Jane Abbott Lighty, both founding members of Seattle Women's Chorus, were the first couple to receive a marriage license in Seattle's King County. They were married on-stage during a holiday concert at Seattle's Benaroya Hall.

In 2015, Seattle Women's Chorus performed at Seattle Mayor Ed Murray's rally to celebrate the Supreme Court decision that legalized same-sex marriage across the country.
