= Chicago Gay Men's Chorus =

American vocal group

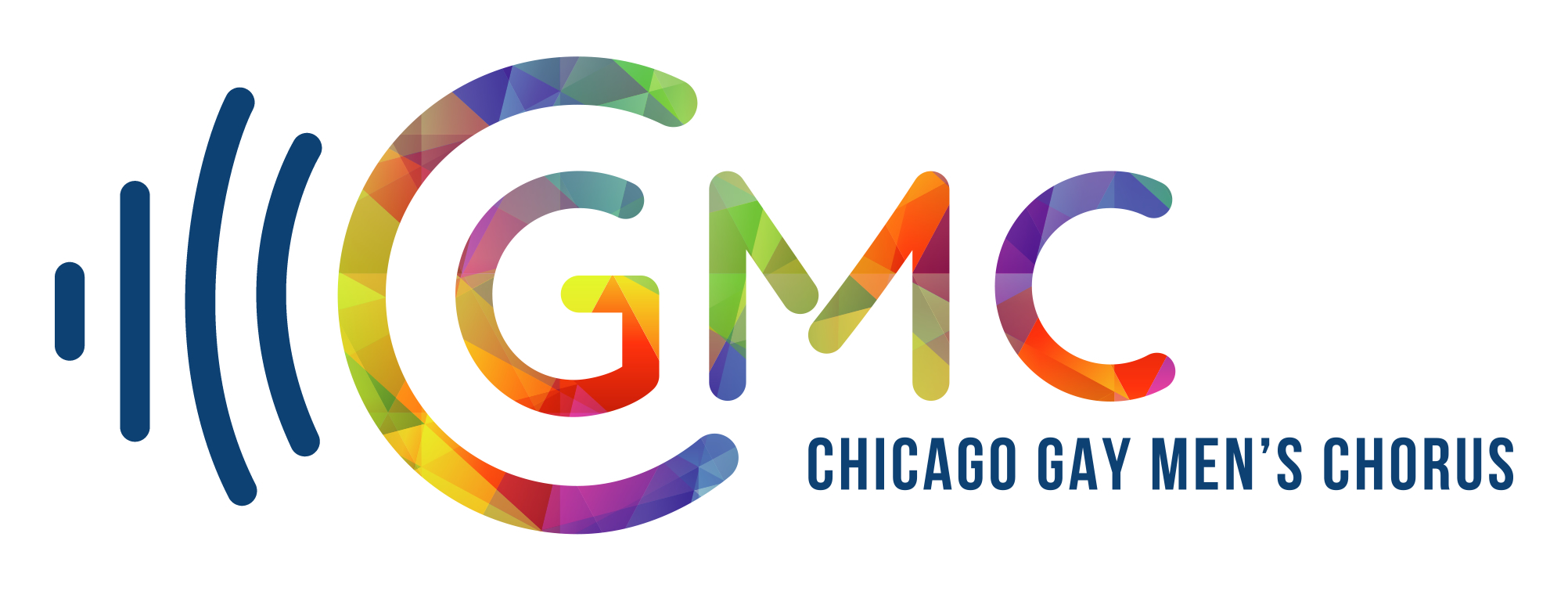

Background information
- Also known as: CGMC
- Origin: Chicago, Illinois, United States
- Genres: Broadway, choral, classical, jazz, popular
- Occupation: Men's Choir
- Instrument: 150+ voices
- Years active: 1983-present
- Members: Artistic Director; Oliver Hands; Managing Director; Kevin Corbett; Accompanist; Ken McMullen
- Website: www.cgmc.org

Official Chicago Gay Men's Chorus 30th anniversary logo for 2012–13

The Chicago Gay Men's Chorus (CGMC) is a choral organization in Chicago, Illinois. Founded in 1983 with 55 singers, the chorus currently consists of over 250 singing members and over 300 members in total.

== History ==
The Chorus was organized in 1983 in response to an invitation to participate in the first National Gay and Lesbian Choral Festival, Come Out! And Sing Together (COAST). The event was staged at New York City's Lincoln Center and featured 1,200 individuals from twelve choruses from across the United States. The fifty-five singers from the Chicago Gay Men's Chorus representing the city of Chicago opened the festival.

After the festival, the Chorus joined choruses from nine other cities to form a musical organization known as Gay And Lesbian Association of Choruses. As one of GALA's founding member groups, CGMC continues its affiliation with the organization and has performed at every music festival sponsored.

In the years since its debut performance, CGMC became a prominent member of Chicago's gay and lesbian community and in the city's arts community as a whole. In 2001, CGMC was inducted into the Chicago Gay and Lesbian Hall of Fame. In 2006, CGMC joined the League of Chicago Theatres; the year also marked CGMC's twenty-fifth performance season. Throughout the history of CGMC, the chorus has been supported, in part, by grants from the Illinois Arts Council and by the Chicago City Arts Program.

== Performances and music ==
CGMC has a regular yearly performance season that consists of a holiday show, and a spring show. The music performed in these concerts ranges from classical to pop to modern music. The Chorus also incorporates a wide range of performance styles into its concerts. In addition to traditional choral material, the concerts often include dance, sets and costumes, and other elements frequently found in musical theater.

The spring concerts are often full-scale theatrical productions, frequently presented in a parodic manner. Past spring productions have included The Pirates of Penzance, The Wizard of Oz, The Mikado, and H.M.S. Pinafore. In 2006, the Chorus performed The Ten Commandments: The Musical, an original musical co-written by the group's Artistic Director, Patrick Sinozich, and a singing member, Bill Larkin. The Chorus has also performed several musical reviews named after Sidetrack, a popular Chicago video nightclub, and based on the club's weekly show tunes video nights.

In addition to its regular performance season, the Chorus makes appearances for fundraising or community representation purposes. In past years, CGMC has appeared at benefits such as Show of Concern presented by Marshall Field's, World of Chocolate presented by the AIDS Foundation of Chicago, and Jubilate! presented by Bonaventure House.

The Chorus has also appeared for organizations or at events such as the marriage equality bill signing (where they sang America The Beautiful at Governor Quinn's personal invitation), Choose Chicago kickoff, AIDS Walk Chicago, International Mr. Leather, the Chicago Gay and Lesbian Pride Parade, the Illinois Gay and Lesbian Rodeo Association, Pride Fest Chicago, and has proudly performed the national anthem several times at Wrigley Field in Chicago. In addition, the Chorus has made various traveling outreach trips to local cities including Bloomington–Normal and Peoria, Illinois. In 2018, the Chorus joined Demi Lovato to perform "Tell Me You Love Me" and "Sorry (Not Sorry)" during her Tell Me You Love Me World Tour stop in Allstate Arena.

The Chorus has made out-of-town appearances in Portland, Oregon, Los Angeles, New Orleans, Detroit, Fort Lauderdale, Tampa, Milwaukee, New York City, Montreal, Kansas City, Indianapolis, Miami, and Denver. The Chorus has also hosted Chicago appearances of choruses from some of these same cities, other nearby cities, and European cities such as Amsterdam in the Netherlands, London in the United Kingdom and Hamburg, Germany.

=== Performance History ===
Season	Cabaret	Holiday Show	Lipstick & Lyrics	Spring Show	Pride/Summer Show
2025-2026	Swiftie Cabaret	A Holly Dolly Christmas	Bette, Barbra & Beyonce	Cher the Love	
2024-2025	Fabulous Fifties	Totally 80s HoliGay	Those Flashy Sassy Seventies	As If!: The Gay 90s	N/A
2023-2024	Sporty Forty	The Big 4-0 Ho! Ho!	Forty and Flirty	Party Like It's 1983	CGMC & WCPA Joint Concert
2022-2023	On the Radio	On Broadway	On MTV	On the Big Screen	
2021-2022	Undressed	Unplugged	Untucked	Unimaginable	
2020-2021	Around the World in 80 Minutes‡	A Christmas Carol: Haunted Homo Holidays‡	Diva Dracula‡	The Wizard of Oz: Debbie Does Dorothy‡	
2019–2020	Family Matters	HoliDisco	All in the Family	Royals: Kings, Queen, and Prince†	
2018–2019	Banned Together	35th Anniversary Holiday Hullaballoo	Band Together	Stonewalled: 50 Queer Years	
2017–2018	Hitting Rock Bottom: Know Hope	Naughty or Nice	Vice Versa	Under the Big Top	
2016–2017	The Great Gaymerican Songbook	Home for the Holidivas	The Dragtones	*BTown: From Barbershop to Boybands	Love Is Great: Collaborative Concert with London Gay Men's Chorus
2015–2016	Saints + Sinners	Miracle on Thirty-Funk Street	Save The Unicorn Club!	My Kind of Town	Sing Your Own Song (GALA)
2014–2015	Don't Tell Mama: the Music of Kander & Ebb	YuleTube: Holiday Favorites from Television	Into the Hood	We're Still Here: CGMC Celebrates Sondheim at 85	
2013–2014	Let's Do It!	Making Spirits Bright	Sex Is in the Heel	Bouncing Off The Walls: Broadway Our Way	Some Like It Hot: Disney Edition (Cabaret)
2012–2013		Make The Yuletide Gay	What Doesn't Kill You... (Makes You Stronger)	All You Need Is Love	Some Like It Hot! (Cabaret)
2011–2012		Holly Follies	Girls' Night Out	That 80's Show	Feel the Love - The Sound of Fabulous (with Unison and Windy City Gay Chorus)
2010–2011		Christmas Follies- Unplugged	Bad Romance	Divas	
2009–2010		Christmas Follies	Bring it On	ExtrABBAganza	Summer Camp
2008–2009		Revolt of the Elves	Bad Girls	Bad Habits	Over The Rainbow
2007–2008		Fruitcake	Lipstick & Lyrics V	Apple Pie	The Boys are Back in Town
2006–2007		Favorite Things	Lipstick & Lyrics IV	Sidetrack V: With a Twist!	25th Anniversary Bash - LIVE!
2005–2006		A Cowboy Christmas (with Chi-Town Squares)	Lipstick & Lyrics III	The Ten Commandments: The Musical	Midwest Pride 2 (with the Indianapolis Men's Chorus)
2004–2005		Fa La La La Blah Blah Blah!	Lipstick & Lyrics II	In the Mood	CGMC World Tour
2003–2004		Sassy Brassy Christmas	Lipstick & Lyrics I	Low Hanging Fruit	Sisters: Hands Across the Water (with Schola Canterosa and Windy City Gay Chorus)
2002–2003		Carols At the Spinet		Just A Little Song and Dance	Viva L'Amour (with Hersong)
2001–2002		Gonna Find Out Who's Naughty & Nice		Sidetrack IV: Bottoms Up!	Love in Black and White
2000–2001		Cool Yule		2001: A Gay Odyssey	Midwest Pride (with Heartland Men's Chorus)
1999–2000		Ho! Ho! Ho!		H.M.S. Pinafore	Pride on the Pier (with Windy City Gay Chorus and Unison)
1998–1999		A Winter Solstice		Men in Musicals	Is It Safe to Come Out Yet?
1997–1998		Make the Yuletide Gay		Forbidden Halsted	True Pride
1996–1997		Gonna Find Out Who's Naughty & Nice		Sidetrack III: Last Call	We're Still Here
1995–1996		Gonna Find Out Who's Naughty & Nice (with The Derivative Duo and About Face Theater Collective)		Sidetrack II: A Hangover	One Night Only
1994–1995		Gonna Find Out Who's Naughty & Nice		Sidetrack: The Musical Review	Is That Pride in Your Pocket, or Are You Just Glad to See Me?
1993–1994		Gonna Find Out Who's Naughty & Nice (with Waukegan Concert Chorus and Christmas Spirit)		The Mikado	Lions and Rhinos and Bears... Oh My!
1992–1993		Gonna Find Out Who's Naughty & Nice		Still Crazy After All These Years	Très Gay (with Noot Aan De Man, Amsterdam Gay Men's Chorus and Tampa Bay Gay Men's Chorus)
1991–1992		Gonna Find Out Who's Naughty & Nice		The Wizard of Oz	Let's Call the Whole Thing Off
1990–1991		Gonna Find Out Who's Naughty & Nice		The Wizard of Oz	Takin' a Chance on Love (with The Akasha Dance Company)
1989–1990		Gonna Find Out Who's Naughty & Nice (with the women of Waukegan Concert Chorus)		Pirates of Penzance	Headed for the Future (with Chi-Town Squares)
1988–1989		Gonna Find Out Who's Naughty & Nice (with The Great Lakes Freedom Band)		Pirates of Penzance	Old Friends (with Gay Men's Chorus of South Florida)
1987–1988		Gonna Find Out Who's Naughty & Nice (with Stardust and The Chicago Gay and Lesbian Chorus)		Nobody Does It Like Me	They Dance So Well, Why Must They Try to Sing? (with The Chicago Gay and Lesbian Chorus)
1986–1987		Gonna Find Out Who's Naughty & Nice			You Gotta Have Friends (with Artemis Singers)
1985–1986		Gonna Find Out Who's Naughty & Nice		The Wonderful World of CGMC	La Chic (with Gay Men's Chorus of Los Angeles)
1984–1985		Gonna Find Out Who's Naughty & Nice (with Artemis Singers)		CGMC and Other Musical Instruments	Together (with New Orleans Gay Men's Chorus)
1983–1984		Gonna Find Out Who's Naughty & Nice			Start Us With 10
1983		Ha, Ha, Ha! Ho, Ho, Ho! And a Couple of Tra, La, Las (Premiere Show)		Here We Go Again	

† - Prepared as a main stage show but presented virtually. ‡ - Virtual performance.

== Membership ==
The Chorus membership is divided into singing members and auxiliary members. The majority of the members are gay men, but the Chorus has a written policy to welcome all persons to the group regardless of sex, race, creed, gender identity, or sexual orientation.

Singing members belong to one of the four singing sections; first- and second-tenor, baritone, and bass. Most of these voices are divided into upper and lower subsections. To become a singing member of the Chorus, a prospective member must have a successful vocal placement with the artistic director. Non-performing auxiliary members are individuals who are tasked with behind the scenes duties in support of the mission of the Chorus.

Each of the shows of the performance season has preparation period of approximately twelve to thirteen weeks; consisting of weekly three-hour rehearsals. In addition to the weekly rehearsals, there may be a number of sectional/full chorus/dance/solo rehearsals that take place during each preparation period, at the request/discretion of the artistic director.

Choreography is also an important part of the CGMC experience, and most performances include some sort of dancing, movement, or "choralography." A team of member choreographers create the dance routines and handle auditions for each performance.

All music is performed "off book" meaning all songs must be completely memorized. With a few exceptions, nearly all run out performances are also performed with memorized music. Run out performances may consist of pieces that the Chorus is working on for an upcoming concert, pieces performed at a recent concert, or selections from the permanent repertoire of the Chorus.

== Organization ==
The Chicago Gay Men's Chorus is a volunteer non-profit organization. Membership dues, ticket sales, performance fees, CD sales, and individual and corporate donations support the operation of the Chorus in addition to grants from the Illinois Arts Council, Art Works Fund, and the Chicago Department of Cultural Affairs' City Arts grant program.

The Artistic Director (AD) leads the artistic staff of the Chorus, which consists of Accompanists, Stage Manager, Choreographers, a music librarian, while the Executive Director oversees operations. The Artistic Director, Executive Director, Stage Manager and Accompanists are paid positions while the others are volunteer positions filled by the Chorus membership.

The Chorus is governed by a Board of Directors, which is responsible for governing the strategic and fiscal operation of the Chorus, which is largely carried out by a system of committees. Members of the Board of Directors consist of members from the Chorus itself or from the general community, and candidates are selected by the Elections Committee. The Board of Directors is led by an Executive Committee made up of the Board President, Vice President, Secretary, and Treasurer.

The Chorus also elects a Membership Council, which is responsible for the member experience including assisting the AD with rehearsal, retention and recruitment of Chorus members, organizing auditions, tracking attendance and member communications. Members of the Membership Council are elected from active singing members of the Chorus, and candidates are selected by the Elections Committee. Upon election, the council selects a Council President and representatives for each singing section of the Chorus.

The operational committees of the Chorus include four standing committees and a number of subcommittees with members appointed by the Executive Director or Board of Directors. The four standing committees are Finance, Fundraising, Performance, and Marketing.

== Recordings ==
In November 2001, the Chorus released its first CD entitled Cool Yule, featuring holiday music with jazz-inspired arrangements. The group's second CD, I Will Be Loved Tonight, was released in December 2004 and is a collection of songs dealing with relationships and love. In 2006, the Chorus released its first collection of live recordings, Favorite Things, with live concert performances of holiday songs popular with the group's audiences. In December 2012, CGMC released Here We Come A-Caroling, featuring holiday songs from years past. In June 2013 a fifth CD, So Happy Together: Festival Gems was released containing recordings from the last three GALA Festival performances.
