= Diverse Harmony =

American youth chorus

Diverse Harmony is an American youth chorus based in Seattle, Washington. Founded in 2002, it is the first Gay-Straight Alliance youth chorus in the United States. Today, Diverse Harmony is an LGBTQ-Ally youth chorus, and their stated mission is "to create a safe, affirming environment where everyone is accepted for who they are." In addition to singing members, the chorus has an extensive support network of volunteers, subscribers, and donors; they are also a non-profit organization. Diverse Harmony is a member of the Gay and Lesbian Association of Choruses (GALA Choruses), and was the first youth chorus to participate in a GALA Choruses Festival. The chorus appeared in the independent film Why We Sing, which has been screened at LGBT film festivals and on PBS stations across the United States.

In 2006, they became the first youth choir to perform at the Gay Games.

== Background ==
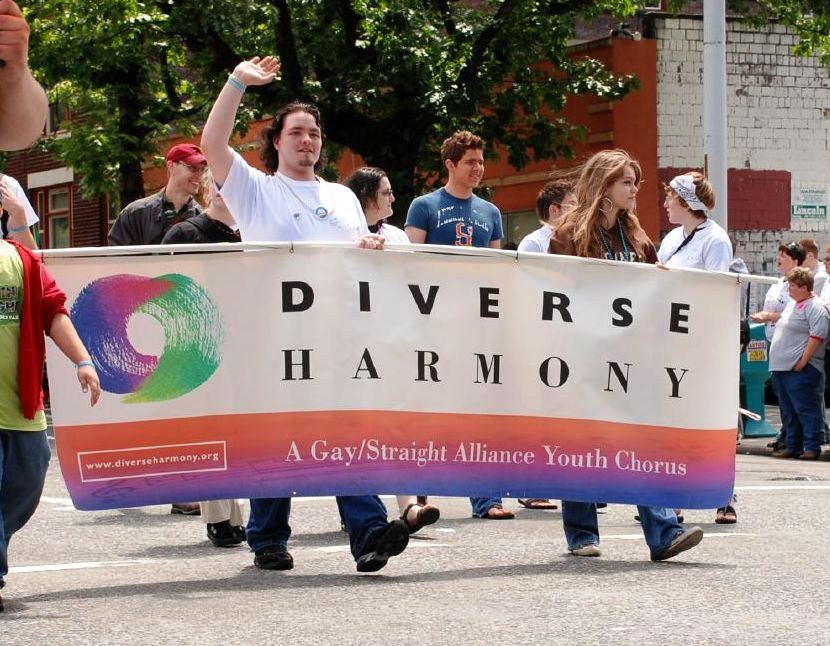
Diverse Harmony contingent marches in Seattle's 2007 gay pride parade.

Washington state has over 300 gay–straight alliance clubs that are "trying to end bullying and harassment of LGBT students and promoting tolerance and acceptance for everyone in an educational atmosphere." LGBT middle and high school students - roughly covering the teenaged years - have been shown to feel safer just knowing a GSA was at their school; the clubs provide support, socializing opportunities, and chances to discuss political and social issues. The brainchild of original musical director Rhonda Juliano, Diverse Harmony grew out of the opportunities that many clubs offered by showcasing talents and providing a space for youth to perform for one another.

Some of the kids who were gay needed a safe place to go, and they liked to express themselves through the arts. We decided that a Gay-Straight Alliance youth chorus would be the perfect place.

Diverse Harmony is made up of roughly 60 choristers. The group accepts young people ages 13–22, regardless of sexual orientation. A select a cappella ensemble, Spectrum, was formed in 2016. Spectrum consists of members from age 21-29.

== History ==
The group started in 2002, after music teacher Rhonda Juliano decided to form the choir to coincide with her own coming out and blending families with her partner. "During the past 20 years, lesbian, gay, bisexual, transgender and questioning students began confiding in Rhonda. She provided the only space where they felt completely safe and free to be themselves - in her classes."

On March 1, 2004, KOMO-TV's Brook Stanford became Diverse Harmony's Companis "mission worker," serving as the community outreach director. In 2004, Diverse Harmony opened Seattle's pride week at Saint Mark Episcopal Cathedral with "Let There Be Pride" and shared the bill with the Seattle Women's Chorus. Diverse Harmony is a member of the Gay and Lesbian Association of Choruses (GALA Choruses), and was the first youth chorus to participate in a GALA Choruses Festival. The chorus has performed twice at the International music festival put on by the Gay and Lesbian Association of Choruses; in 2004, at the Place des Arts in Montreal, Quebec, and again in 2008, at the Adrienne Arsht Center for the Performing Arts in Miami, Florida. Through these associations, they became one of four choirs predominantly featured in the independent film Why We Sing!, which has been screened at LGBT film festivals and on 300 PBS stations across the United States.

In 2005, Seattle's pride week theme was "The Courage to Love," and Diverse Harmony again performed, sharing the stage with the Seattle Men's Chorus and the Seattle Women’s Chorus. In 2006, the theme was "Believe," and the chorus presented at Seattle's First Baptist Church. In 2006, Diverse Harmony also performed at the Interfaith Pride Service, celebrating Washington state's new Anti-Discrimination Law and the victory of Andersen v. King County.

Diverse Harmony also performed at Gay Games VII in Chicago, making them the first youth choir ever to perform at the Gay Games. On June 2, 2007, their annual concert featured actress Alexandra Billings. On October 19, 2006, Diverse Harmony was the beneficiary of "One Night Only," a "gala cabaret evening" and the last performances at Thumpers, a popular performance venue.

Diverse Harmony's spring concert on May 30, 2008, was "Awake!," utilizing spirituality themes and exploring the human condition; "a musical collage that journey[ed] from a dark past, through a better today, and into a hopeful tomorrow." This was also reflected in their artistic poster, created by chorus members, incorporating, among other iconic symbols, a rainbow, likely in reference to the rainbow flag.

The June 2011 show was "Double Shots & Forget-Me-Nots," a performance covering themes of acceptance and self-worth while dealing with the contemporary issues of homophobia, transphobia, bullying, and youth suicide. This original show, written by Diverse Harmony choristers Kat Miller and Adam Quillian, included musical numbers "The Gospel of Google" and "Not a Fairy Tale."

Jared Brayton Bollenbacher was the Artistic Director for Diverse Harmony from 2011 through 2017. In February 2018, Seattle director/conductor/composer/performer Eric Lane Barnes took over as Artistic Director of Diverse Harmony and the select a cappella ensemble Spectrum.

== Discography ==
- "Our World" (2004)
