= GALA Choruses =

International association of LGBTQ choruses

The Gay and Lesbian Association of Choruses ("GALA Choruses") is an international association of LGBTQ choruses founded in 1982. In its inaugural performance 14 choruses performed together in September 1982 in San Francisco as part of the first Gay Games. It aims to foster artistic and organizational development within its member choruses. The association includes almost 10,000 vocalists in over 100 associated choruses singing as male, female and mixed ensembles in a wide variety of styles. GALA Choruses produces a large festival every four years, in addition to a number of smaller annual workshops and conferences.

== Festivals ==
Artistic and business directors of the choruses then in existence envisioned both the San Francisco and New York City events at the first planning meeting in Chicago, Illinois (15–17 May 1981) that set the course for the official founding of GALA Choruses.

- 1982 - San Francisco, California
- 1983 - New York, New York
- 1986 - Minneapolis, Minnesota
- 1989 - Seattle, Washington - about 2,500 delegates
- 1992 - Denver, Colorado - over 3,400 delegates
- 1996 - Tampa, Florida - over 4,700 delegates
- 2000 - San Jose, California - over 4,700 delegates
- 2004 - Place des Arts, Montreal, Quebec - over 5,700 delegates
- 2008 - Adrienne Arsht Center for the Performing Arts, Miami, Florida
- 2012 - Denver Performing Arts Complex, Denver, Colorado - over 6,000 delegates
- 2016 - Denver Performing Arts Complex, Denver, Colorado
- 2020 - Postponed due to the ongoing COVID-19 pandemic
- 2024 - Minneapolis, Minnesota

=== Notes ===
1. The San Francisco event was called the West Coast Choral Festival. Members of the San Francisco Gay Men's Chorus organized and ran this event as a forerunner to the larger event planned the following year in New York City.
2. The New York event was called COAST, which stood for Come Out and Sing Together. It was organized and run by members of the New York City Gay Men's Chorus.
3. First GALA festival in which a women's chorus, Denver Women's Chorus, performed
4. Out of forty-four choruses, eight were women's choruses; eleven were mixed choruses
5. Festival 2024

== Notable member choruses ==
- Anna Crusis Women's Choir
- Atlanta Gay Men's Chorus
- Beijing Queer Chorus
- Boston Gay Men's Chorus
- Chicago Gay Men's Chorus
- Columbus Gay Men's Chorus
- Connecticut Gay Men's Chorus
- Coro Allegro
- Diverse Harmony Youth Chorus
- Gay Men's Chorus of Los Angeles
- Gay Men's Chorus of San Diego
- Gay Men's Chorus of Washington, D.C.
- Golden Gate Men's Chorus - San Francisco, CA
- Heartland Men's Chorus - Kansas City, MO
- Queer Chorus of San Francisco
- New York City Gay Men's Chorus
- Oakland Gay Men's Chorus
- One Voice Mixed Chorus - Minneapolis/St. Paul, MN
- Philadelphia Gay Men's Chorus
- Portland Gay Men's Chorus
- San Diego Men's Chorus
- San Francisco Gay Men's Chorus
- Seattle Men's Chorus
- Turtle Creek Chorale - Dallas, TX
- Twin Cities Gay Men's Chorus - Minneapolis/St. Paul, MN
- Vancouver Men's Chorus
