= One Voice Mixed Chorus =

Background information
- Origin: Minneapolis-Saint Paul, United States
- Genres: classical, popular, choral, jazz
- Years active: 1988-present
- Spinoffs: OVation
- Website: www.OneVoiceMN.org

One Voice Mixed Chorus is an LGBTQ choral organization in the Twin Cities of Minneapolis-Saint Paul, United States.

One Voice Mixed Chorus includes gay, lesbian, bisexual, transgender people and straight allies. It is one of the largest LGBT choruses in North America, the 100 singing members range from ages 15 to 81, and the “Fifth Section” has more than 50 non-singing volunteers. They perform in schools, at community events, and for marquee concerts. Under the direction of Artistic Director Kimberly Waigwa, the chorus has throughout the Twin Cities and Greater Minnesota.

== History ==
One Voice Mixed Chorus gave its debut concert in 1989, making it one of the first choruses to bring together people from the LGBTQ communities in the region. The chorus was founded in 1988 by Minnesota native Paul Petrella.

== Performances and music ==
One Voice Mixed Chorus performs 20 to 30 events annually. Two major concerts are held in January and June of each year. The chorus also conducts an annual outreach tour (often in greater Minnesota), and a series of workshops and concerts in Twin Cities middle and high-schools. The annual fundraiser, Spring Fever, is held in April.

Their concert themes have included messages about LGBT life experiences, humor within their community, safe sex, AIDS, breast cancer awareness, queer reflections on history, the many dimensions of families, freedom songs from oppressed communities of the world, and music by typically under-represented composers (especially women and LesBiGayTrans artists).

In addition to the chorus, there is an ensemble, OVation, that is a subset of the One Voice singers who perform in the community and at One Voice's major concerts. Of particular importance is the outreach to schools and youth.

One Voice Mixed Chorus also participates in the GALA Choruses Festival held in Minneapolis.

=== Performance history ===
Recent appearances include:

- Come Fly With Me: A GLBT Romp Around the World, June 15–16, 2012 at History Theatre St. Paul, Minnesota
- Chorus America Opening Concert, June 13, 2012 at Orchestra Hall Minneapolis, Minnesota
- MPR Harmony in the Park, June 7, 2012 at Minnehaha Park Bandshell Minneapolis, Minnesota
- QMC Concert, June 4, 2012 at Como Park Pavilion St. Paul, Minnesota
- Brave Souls & Dreamers, January 21–22, 2012 at Hopkins High School Minnetonka, Minnesota
- Boom, Bang, Crash, June 10–11, 2011 at Heart of the Beast Puppet and Mask Theater, Minneapolis, Minnesota
- Love Dares Speak Its Name, January 14–15, 2011 at Central Presbyterian Church, St. Paul, Minnesota
- Different is Great- A family Concert, June 4–5, 2010 at Heart of the Beast Puppet and Mask Theater, Minneapolis, Minnesota
- Unsilenced, GLBT and Jewish Voices of the Holocaust, January 30–31, 2010
- Lavender Green: Thinking Globally, Singing Locally, June 13–14, 2009
- Many Lives, One Song: Hope for a World Beyond AIDS, December 5–6, 2008
- GALA Festival VIII in Miami, Florida, Carnival Center for the Performing Arts, July 12–19, 2008
- Old New Borrowed Q: Celebrating 20 years, June 21–22, 2008 Saint Paul, Minnesota
- Uncommon Light: Brahms and the Beauty of Shadow, January 25–26, 2008 Saint Paul, Minnesota
- Outreach Tour to Iowa (Des Moines, Iowa City, Cedar Falls) November 9–11, 2007
- Generations Rock Concert, June 16 & 17, 2007 at the American History Theater Saint Paul, Minnesota
- Reclaiming Faith, In The Spirit Of Justice, January 20–21, 27-28, 2007
- Outreach Tour, Northern Minnesota and Winnipeg Canada, November 10–13, 2006

== Membership ==
Membership is by audition, held twice each year. In addition there are volunteer opportunities available to non-singing members. These members comprise what is called the Fifth Section.

== Organization ==
One Voice Mixed Chorus is a 501(c)3 non-profit organization. It is funded through dues from singing members, donations from individuals and corporations as well as grants.

Kimberly Waigwa is the Artistic Director.

One Voice Mixed Chorus operates under the direction of a board of directors and a number of committees. Committees include personnel, development, production, membership, finance, and music selection.

Staff positions include the artistic director, executive director, operations coordinator, and the OVation ensemble coach.

== Recordings ==
- BraveSouls & Dreamers, 2012
- Old New Borrowed Q, 2008
- Building Bridges, 2005
- Songs of the Soul, 2000–2004

== Associations ==
- Member of The Gay and Lesbian Association of Choruses (GALA).
- Member of the Queer Music Consortium (QMC).
