= Llangollen International Musical Eisteddfod =

Music festival in Wales

Coordinates: 52.9735°N 3.1754°W

Llangollen International Eisteddfod Eisteddfod Ryngwladol Llangollen (Welsh)
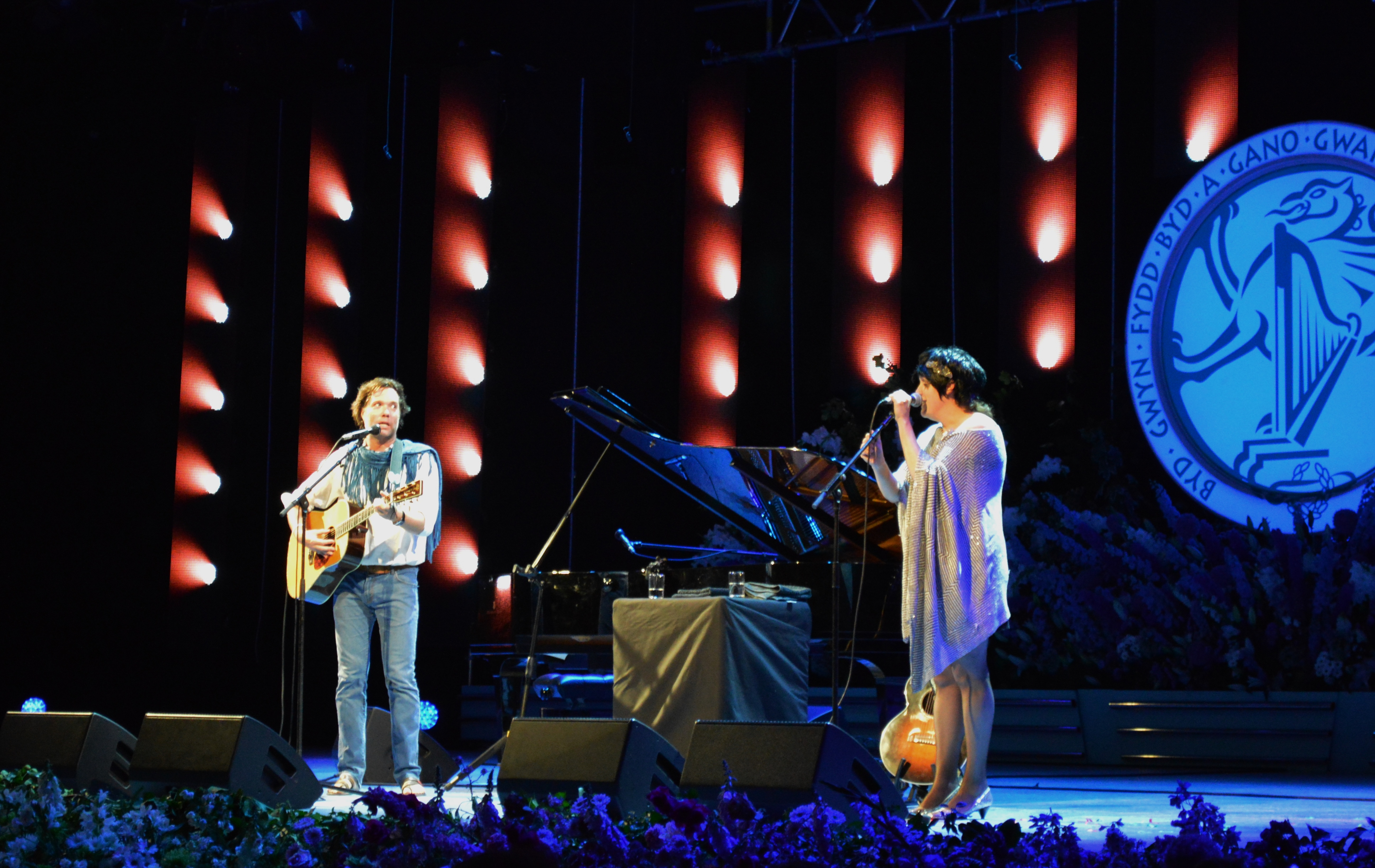
- Rufus and Lucy Wainwright at the event in 2015
- Status: active
- Location: Llangollen
- Country: Wales
- Established: June 1947; 79 years ago
- Participants: 4,000
- Attendance: 50,000
- Leader: Dave Danford
- Website: international-eisteddfod.co.uk

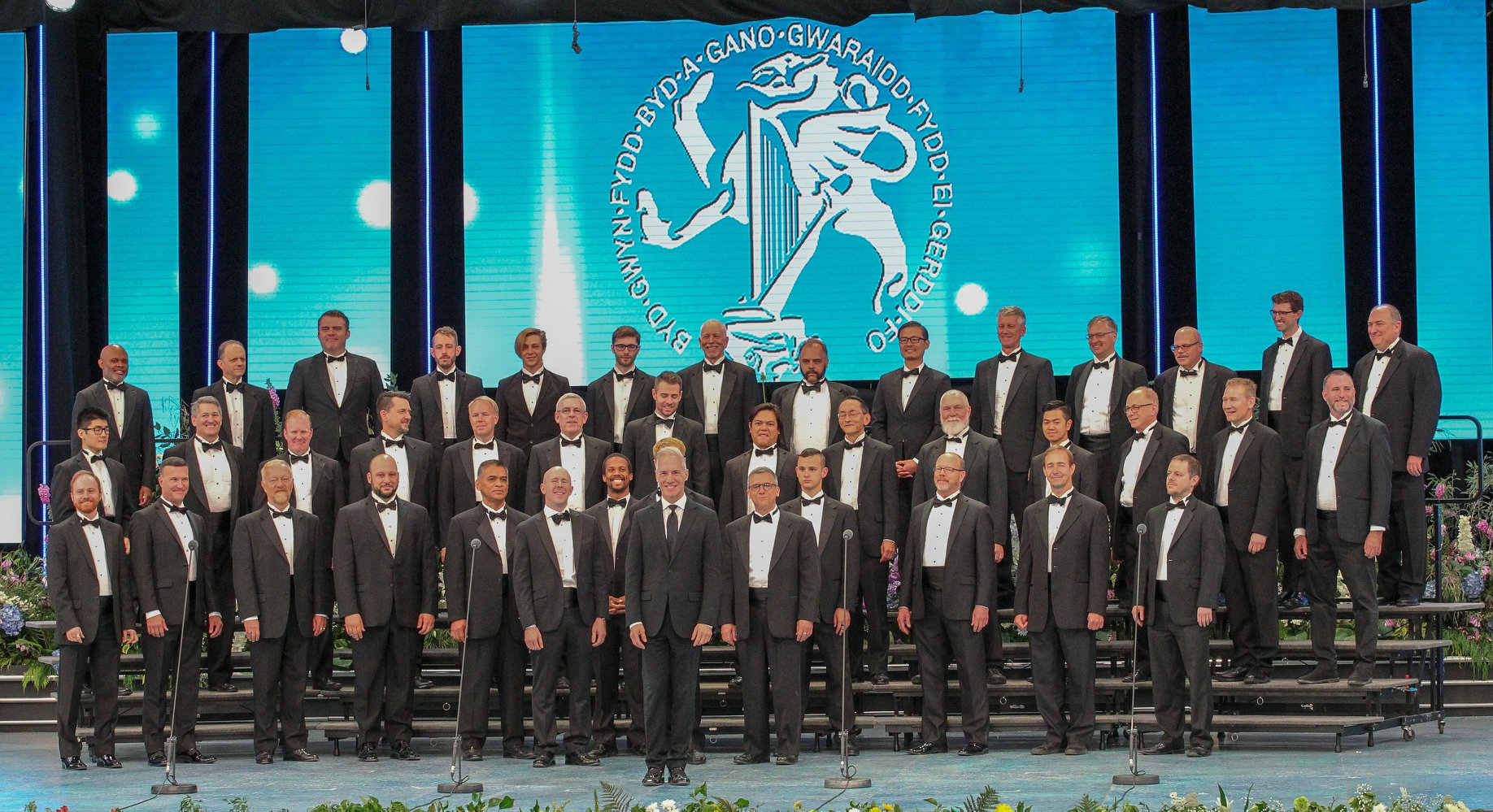
Golden Gate Men's Chorus at the event in July 2018

The Llangollen International Musical Eisteddfod is a music festival which takes place every year during the second week of July in Llangollen, north Wales. It is one of several large annual Eisteddfodau in Wales. Singers and dancers from around the world are invited to take part in over 20 competitions followed each evening by concerts on the main stage. Over five thousand singers, dancers and instrumentalists from around 50 countries perform to audiences of more than 50,000 over the 6 days of the event.

Famous performers at Llangollen have included Luciano Pavarotti (who first competed in Llangollen in 1955 with his father and a choir from their home town Modena, and for whom the Eisteddfod's principal trophy – the Choir of the World Pavarotti Trophy – is named), Red Army Ensemble, Julian Lloyd Webber and Ladysmith Black Mambazo. The final Sunday Evening Gala Concert has featured Katherine Jenkins, Bryn Terfel, Kiri Te Kanawa, James Galway and Montserrat Caballe.

== Origins ==
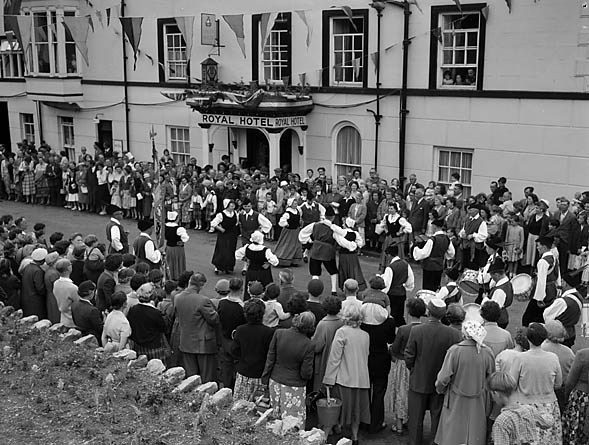
Dancing at the 1957 Eisteddfod

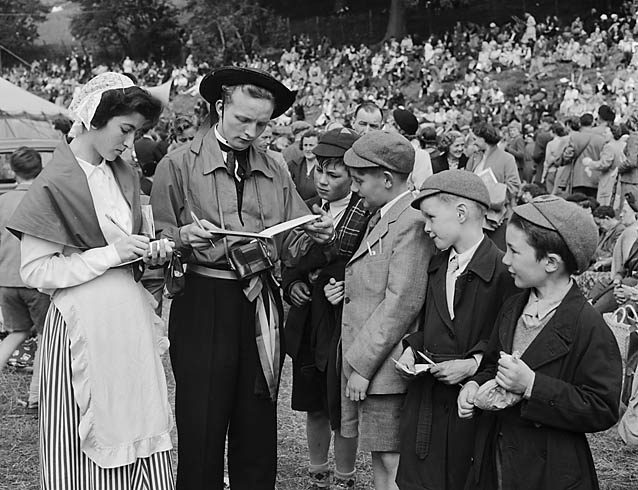
Llangollen International Musical Eisteddfod, 1954

The origins of the International Eisteddfod go back to 1943, when Harold Tudor, an officer of the British Council, arranged a visit for members of governments-in-exile to the Welsh National Eisteddfod in Bangor. The excursion was well received, especially by the noted writer and poet Juraj Slavik, the Minister for the Interior in the Czechoslovakia government-in-exile. Following the visit he wrote to Tudor praising the value of music as a way of healing the effects of war. The following year an international concert was held as part of the Llandybie National Eisteddfod.

Towards the end of 1945 Tudor proposed that an international choral festival be added to the 1947 Welsh National Eisteddfod; however, the Council of the National Eisteddfod felt that as all their effort was directed to rebuilding their own organisation, they could not take on such a scheme. Tudor modified his proposal into an independent music festival, and found support for this idea from W. S. Gwynn Williams, Welsh composer and music publisher, and George Northing, a teacher from Ysgol Dinas Brân and chairman of Llangollen town council. Gwynn Williams and Northing both pressed for the Eisteddfod to be in their home town of Llangollen.

The public gave support to this idea at two public meetings in May 1946, but concerns were also raised about who would come, where the event would be held and how the event would be financed. The British Council offered to help find choirs from Europe and to give financial support; however, the town decided to raise the money through a public subscription, and quickly gathered over £1100. George Northing was appointed as director of the executive board; Gwynn Williams became music director; Harold Tudor was director of publicity; and W. Clayton Russon, a local businessman and High Sheriff of Merionethshire, became president.

Plans to hold the event on the school field of Dinas Brân County School progressed throughout 1946-47. Accommodation for the overseas competitors would be in houses in the town and surrounding area, and domestic participants would be given beds in church and school halls. As rationing was still in place, ration coupons had to be found for all the visitors, and the Minister of Food was eventually persuaded to supply these.

In June 1947 it was time for competitors to travel to Llangollen, but a railway strike had started in France, and there was serious doubt as to whether any overseas competitors would be able to arrive. The organisers were relieved when the first coach of competitors arrived, bringing the ladies' choir Grupo Musical Feminino from Porto. They were the eventual winners of the Ladies Competition, whilst the Men's Competition was won by the Hungarian workers' choir, who had completed their journey to Wales by hitch-hiking when their train had been cancelled at Basel because of the French strike.

The Esperanto Society played a significant part in the first year, when it was felt that there could be a shortage of participants. Reto Rossetti, a well-known figure and author in the Esperanto movement, was asked to help, and through publicity in Esperanto magazines and to the surprise of the organisers, several groups contacted the Eisteddfod committee. Two troupes of Spanish dancers, on a tour of Britain sponsored by the British Council and the Esperanto Society, arrived and despite there not being a dance competition in the first year, performed to delighted audiences. Folk dance competitions have featured in every subsequent Llangollen Eisteddfod. The eisteddfod was brought to close with what has now become the traditional Sunday concert, featuring Sir John Barbirolli and the Hallé Orchestra. The 1947 International Eisteddfod was hailed as an unqualified success, with praise for the organisers, the founders, and all the competitors. There was even a surplus of £1,432 to be used for the next year's event.

In 1949, just four years after the end of the war, there was a major test mission to promote reconciliation when a choir from Lübeck came to compete at the Eisteddfod. However there had been Austrian and Italian choirs. As the choir tell it in a letter now in the Clwyd archive in Ruthin, there was a tearful welcome from the eisteddfod helpers and the townspeople, with tea and sandwiches, when the choir arrived at the Llangollen station. Later, the festival's compère Mr Hywel Roberts introduced the choir with the words: "Ladies and gentlemen, please welcome our friends from Germany." The town organised a concert to help the choir raise funds, and in 2015 members of the choir were still corresponding with Llangollen friends.

== Pavilion ==
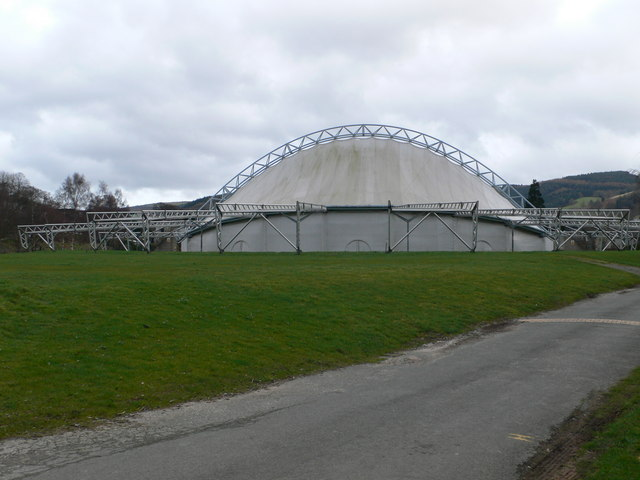
The Pavilion at the event.

The Llangollen Eisteddfod had always been held in a large temporary tent, but, in the 1980s, this was proving to be inadequate. In 1985 a Development Board began to raise funds to build a permanent venue. A permanent pavilion was erected in the early 1990s, led by Clwyd County Council, to stage the eisteddfod and be available for the rest of the year for other events. The pavilion had a 400-seat theatre and a 1500-seat auditorium, which could be expanded to include an additional 3000 people by using a temporary tent structure.

In 2025 the Arts Council of Wales gave £166,000 to update the pavilion, particularly with new sound and lighting systems.

== Motto ==
The Welsh motto of the International Eisteddfod, "Byd gwyn fydd byd a gano. Gwaraidd fydd ei gerddi fo", was composed by the poet T. Gwynn Jones in 1946, a few months after the eisteddfod was established. It has appeared on the Eisteddfod trophies, artwork and various artefacts of the eisteddfod for 75 years. It is usually translated as: "Blessed is a world that sings. Gentle are its songs."

However the word gwyn has a number of meanings, for example "white" as well as "pure" or "holy", and it is used many times in the Bible, for example in the Beatitudes, to translate the Greek word μακάριοι, where English uses "blessed". It is said that Gwynn Williams was referring to this in selecting the motto. However in March 2023, it appeared that the motto was being misinterpreted by English speakers to mean the colour "white". There was a proposal for the eisteddfod to change its motto, but there was a wave of opposition to this, and it did not proceed.

== 21st century ==
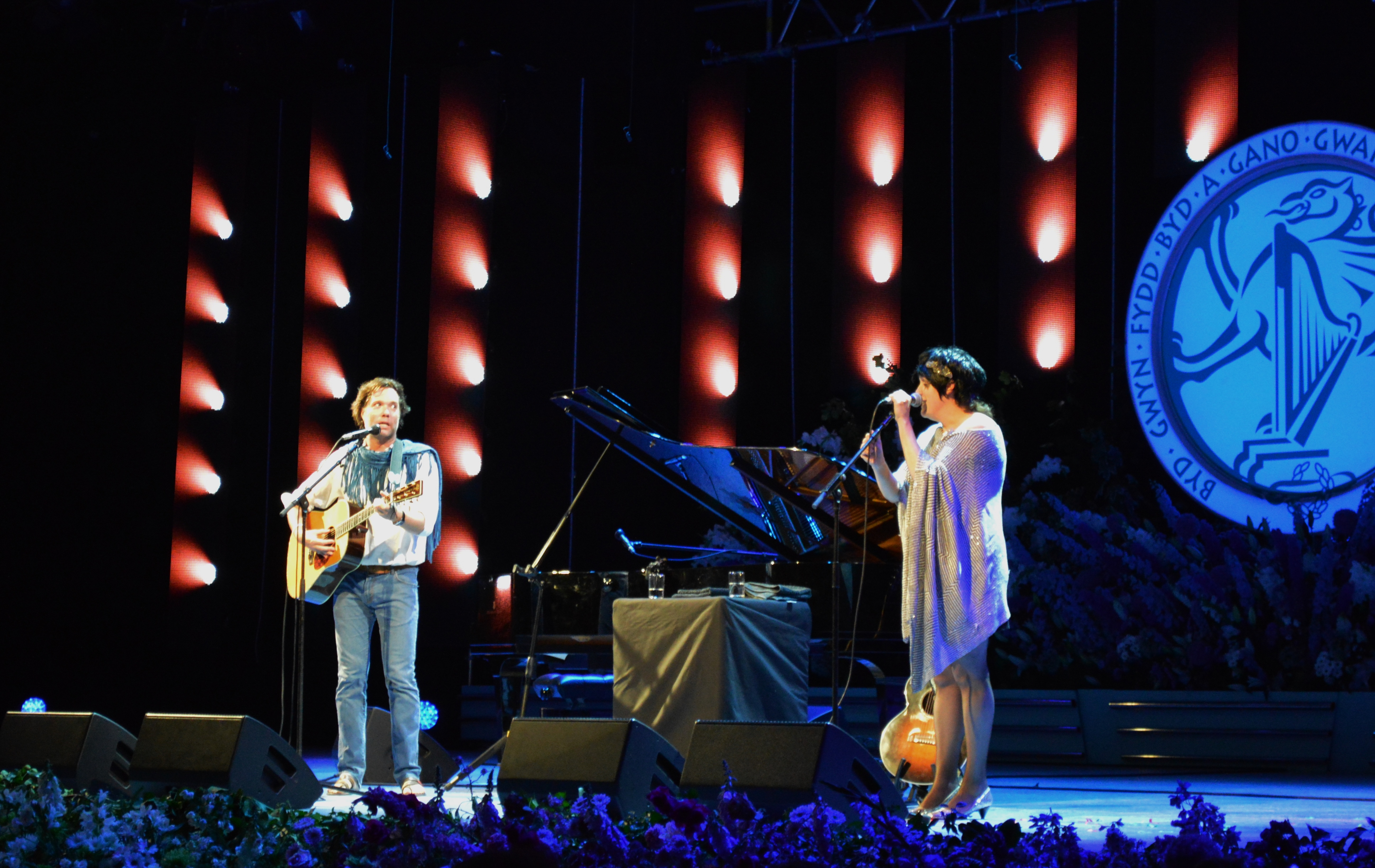
Rufus and Lucy Wainwright performing in 2015

The 2007 Eisteddfod included performances by José Carreras, Joan Baez, and Hayley Westenra. In 2008, there were performances by Elaine Paige, All Angels, and Alfie Boe; in 2009, performances by Barbara Dickson, Sir Willard White, Blake, and Natasha Marsh, with a James Bond 007 spectacular, featuring the Orchestra of Welsh National Opera, as the Sunday finale; 2010 saw performances by Katherine Jenkins and Nigel Kennedy. In 2011 there were concerts featuring Lulu, Russell Watson, Faryl Smith, Ruthie Henshaw and McFly.

In 2012, the Eisteddfod played host to Lesley Garrett, Alison Balsom, Nicola Benedettii and Sian Edwards in a celebration concert for the Queen's Diamond Jubilee. There were also appearances by Alfie Boe, Steffan Morris, and Valentina Nafornta, and a performance of Karl Jenkins's new work "The Peacemakers" by a specially formed massed choir accompanied by the Llangollen International Eisteddfod Orchestra. The week was rounded off by the Grand Finale Concert, featuring Fflur Wyn, Wynne Evans, Mark Llewelyn Evans, John Owen-Jones and Richard Balcombe.

Since 2011, the Sunday evening concert has been given over to more "popular" music, such as McFly, UB40, Status Quo, and Manic Street Preachers.

== Parade ==
A parade is usually held on the Tuesday of the Eisteddfod week, in which both the locals and visitors, take part dancing, singing, and playing musical instruments, whilst marching the streets of Llangollen. However, in 2016 the parade was moved to the Friday to enable more competitors to take part.

== See also ==
- List of music festivals in the United Kingdom
