= Oakland Gay Men's Chorus =

- Choir
- Origin: Oakland, California, U.S.
- Founded: 1999
- Founder: Dick Kramer
- Genre: Broadway, choral, classical, jazz, popular
- Members: 80+ voices
- Headquarters: Oakland, California, U.S.
- Affiliation: GALA Choruses (Gay and Lesbian Association of Choruses)
- Website: www.oaklandgmc.org

Oakland Gay Men's Chorus (OaklandGMC) is a choral ensemble of some 80 voices, headquartered in the San Francisco Bay Area's East Bay. Membership is open to singers with voices in the tenor, baritone, and bass ranges. The chorus sings an annual season of three programs with concerts held in various East Bay communities. In addition, the group performs several outreach programs throughout the community each year. Its mission: "The Oakland Gay Men's Chorus gives voice through song to a community where everyone matters".

OaklandGMC was founded as the Oakland-East Bay Gay Men's Chorus in 1999 by Dick Kramer (1927–2007), who had previously been the first choral director of the San Francisco Gay Men's Chorus and the Golden Gate Men's Chorus. Initially constituted under the Pacific Center for Human Growth, the Oakland-East Bay Gay Men's Chorus became an independent non-profit 501(c)(3) organization in 2006. The Oakland Gay Men's Chorus is its performing arm and brands itself "Pride of the East Bay".

Oakland Gay Men's Chorus is a member of GALA Choruses (Gay and Lesbian Association of Choruses).

== Leaders ==
=== Artistic Directors & Conductors ===
- Dick Kramer (1999–2003)
- Michael Carlson (2003–2006)
- Brandon Adams, interim (2007)
- Kathleen Hollingsworth, interim (2007)
- Michael Robert Patch (2008-2011)
- Stephanie Lynne Smith (2011-2012, Feb-Sep 2014 [interim])
- Jeremiah Selvey (2013-Jan 2014)
- Carl Pantle (Oct 2014-2015)
- William Sauerland (2015-2019)
- Ben Riggs (2019-2024)
- Bruce Southard (2025-Current)

=== Board Presidents ===
- Joe Oshinski (2000)
- Kim Boyd (2001)
- John Rogers (2002)
- Eric Borgerson (2002)
- Scott Stewart (2003)
- Peter Dempsey (2004–2005)
- John Niec (2005–2006)
- Richard Fairly (2006–2007)
- Brad Niess (2008)
- Peter Dempsey (2009)
- Brad Niess (2010, 2012-2013)
- Mel Terry (2011)
- Lawrence Turner (2014-2016)
- Jeff McEwen (2017-2018)
- Dustin Bankston (2019-2021)
- Joe Rosenmayer (2022-2023)
- Wally Bee (2024-2025)
- Paul Dannhauser (2025-Current)

=== Accompanists ===
- Scott Stewart
- Thaddeus Pinkston
- Wendell Frey
- Ben Kiem
- John Lehrack
- Grace Renaud
- Lynden Bair
