= Gay Men's Chorus of San Diego =

American choral group

Background information
- Also known as: GMCSD
- Origin: San Diego, California, U.S.
- Genres: Broadway, choral, classical, jazz, popular
- Occupation: Men's Chorus
- Instrument: 75 voices
- Years active: 1992- 2009
- Members: Artistic Director; Gary Holt; President; Steve Tiger
- Past members: San Diego Men's Chorus

The Gay Men's Chorus of San Diego (GMCSD), was a choral organization of gay male singers who performed from 1992 to 2009. The mission of The Gay Men's Chorus of San Diego was to express dedication to musical excellence by producing high quality choral performances, as well as to actively support and promote the gay community as goodwill ambassadors through music. GMCSD was a member of the Gay and Lesbian Association of Choruses (GALA) and the San Diego Performing Arts League.

== Organization ==
The Gay Men's Chorus of San Diego was a non-profit organization that operated under the umbrella of Finest City Performing Arts, Inc. It was composed of 80-100 singers, with the number of participants fluctuating throughout the year. At the beginning of every season the group hosted an event called "Info Night" welcoming men who wished to sing with the chorus. During Info Night, Prospective singers underwent a simple audition process. GMCSD was managed by a board of directors composed of elected directors and community members. Elections were held each year during the Spring Concert period.

== Origins ==
GMCSD was a self-identified "gay" chorus that was incorporated January 1993 in San Diego, and began rehearsing in the Great Hall of the Cathedral Church of Saint Paul on 5th Avenue, under the artistic direction of Gary Holt.

== Merger ==
In January 2010, The Gay Men's Chorus of San Diego formally merged with The San Diego Men's Chorus, forming a new performing arts entity titled the San Diego Gay Men's Chorus. Each of the two 'legacy' choruses participated under their separate names in a joint holiday concert at San Diego's Balboa Theatre in December 2009.
