= Portland Gay Men's Chorus =

Gay choral group based in Portland, Oregon, U.S.

- The organization's logo

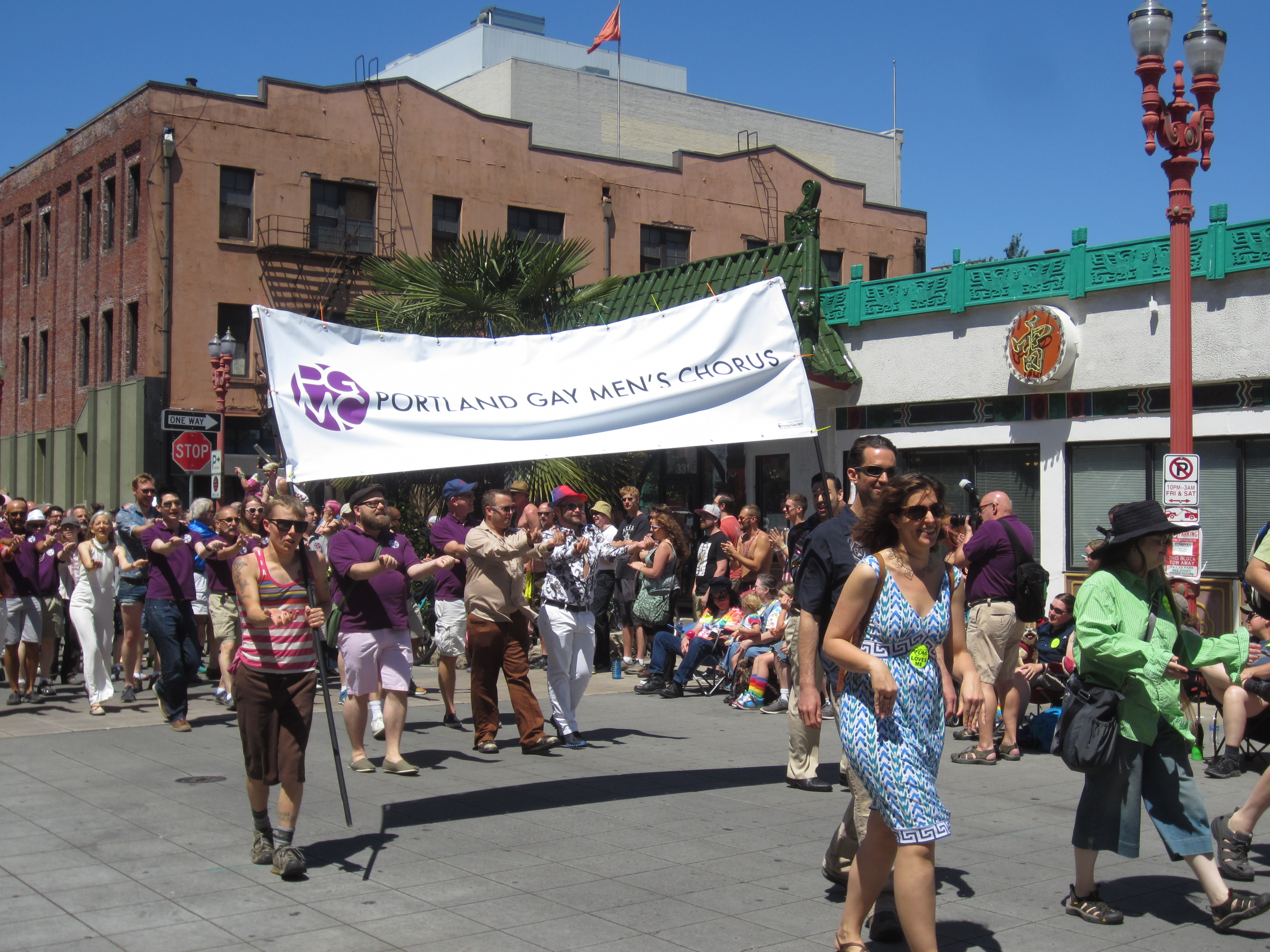
- The Portland Gay Men's Chorus at 2016 Portland Pride
- Abbreviation: PGMC
- Formation: 1980; 46 years ago
- Type: Nonprofit
- Registration no.: 93-0776616
- Location: Portland, Oregon
- Affiliations: GALA Choruses
- Website: www.pdxgmc.org

The Portland Gay Men's Chorus (PGMC) is a gay-identified, non-profit choral group based in Portland, Oregon, United States. The group was founded in 1980 and formally incorporated in 1981, and is the fourth oldest chorus to publicly identify as gay by using that description in their official name. Today, the PGMC is open to all adults regardless of gender or sexuality, and currently includes singers who are women, transgender, and/or straight.

Since its founding, PGMC has been active in the civic and cultural life of Portland and Oregon more broadly. The group holds an annual holiday concert and performances for Pride Month in June, and regularly appears at the Portland Pride Festival. PGMC has also performed at places and events as varied as the openings of Pioneer Courthouse Square and the Oregon Convention Center, the Oregon Zoo, Portland City Club, and the Oregon State Legislature. The group sang at the 1985 inauguration of Oregon Secretary of State Barbara Roberts, making it the first LGBTQ chorus to sing for the inauguration of an elected state official.

PGMC is a charter member of the Gay and Lesbian Association of Choruses and has performed with other LGBTQ choruses, including local counterparts, like the Portland Lesbian Choir, an LGBTQ youth choir called Bridging Voices, and Rose City Pride Bands, as well as national and international groups like the Beijing Queer Chorus. PGMC has collaborated with the Oregon Ballet Theatre and the Oregon Symphony, and has commissioned pieces by composers such as Kate Campbell, Lou Harrison, Anne LeBaron, Robert Seeley, Tom Simonds, Tomáš Svoboda, and David York.

== History ==
In April 1980, Gary Coleman, Mark Jones, and Mark Richards were inspired by a performance of the San Francisco Gay Men's Chorus. They placed an advertisement in a local LGBTQ newspaper called The Fountain, searching for potential members for a choral performance at the upcoming Portland Pride Festival. Twenty men responded, twelve showed up for rehearsal, and on June 19, 1980, the group sang in their inaugural concert at the Metropolitan Community Church of Portland. PGMC was formally incorporated on June 30, 1981, and quickly grew to over 100 members.

In the 1980s, PGMC lost more than 120 members to HIV/AIDS during the beginning of the AIDS crisis, at one point dwindling to only 30 members. During this time, the group worked to raise funds for HIV/AIDS activist groups, such as CAP Northwest (formerly Cascade AIDS Project), which PGMC still works with today. The group sang at the 1984 inauguration of Oregon Secretary of State Barbara Roberts, making it the first LGBTQ chorus to sing for the inauguration of an elected state official.

PGMC toured in protest of 1992 Oregon Ballot Measure 9, which would have amended the Constitution of Oregon to say that homosexuality is "abnormal" and "perverse". The measure failed, but two years later, 1994 Oregon Ballot Measure 13 was proposed, and the group went on another protest tour of the new measure, which was expected to have a similar effect on the LGBTQ community in Oregon. The new measure also failed.

The group hosted the GALA Choruses leadership conference in 2001.

PGMC was one of the Portland cultural icons to appear in the 2011 TV show Portlandia.

== See also ==
- Culture of Portland, Oregon
- List of gay men's choruses
- Music of Oregon
