= San Diego Men's Chorus =

Former choral group in San Diego, California

- Also known as: SDMC
- Origin: San Diego, California, US
- Genres: Broadway, choral, classical, jazz, popular
- Occupation: Men's Chorus
- Instrument: 40 to 70 voices
- Years active: 1985-2009
- Members: Artistic Director; Jerry R. Foust; Principal Accompanist; Amy Dalton
- Past members: Artistic Director; Mr. Christopher Allen; Principal Accompanist; Mr. Glen Ward San Diego Men's Chorus

San Diego Men's Chorus (SDMC) was a men's chorus in San Diego, California, during the period of 1985 to 2009. The chorus was served by four artistic directors throughout its history, concluding, in its final years, with the direction of Jerry R. Foust, who had served previously as the assistant director for more than 18 months before assuming the artistic director position in January 2006.

== History ==
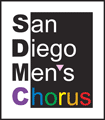
Official San Diego Men's Chorus logo

San Diego Men's Chorus was founded in May 1985 by a small group of committed singers who felt a need to provide San Diego with a quality presentation of men's choral music. Membership was open by audition, and, on September 9, 1985, a total of 55 men were in attendance at the first weekly rehearsal.

SDMC was assisted by members of the Gay Men's Chorus of Los Angeles, which, in August of that year, staged a fundraiser concert at the Casa del Prado Theater in Balboa Park in San Diego, California. Thus, the new chorus in San Diego was able to begin with US$1,500 already in the coffers.

SDMC has had many noteworthy achievements in its twenty plus year history:

- Performed numerous formal concerts in such venues as the Shrine Auditorium and Wiltern Theatre in Los Angeles, the Morton H. Meyerson Symphony Center in Dallas, Denver's Buell Hall, and the University of Washington, Seattle. Local venues include San Dlego's Copley Symphony Hall, Spreckels Theatre, Mandeville Auditorium at UCSD, Mandell Weiss Theatre (La Jolla Playhouse), The Grand Ballroom of the Cafe del Rey Moro in Balboa Park, Bahia Hotel and several area churches including the First Unitarian Universalist and University Christian Churches).
- Collaborated in artistic efforts with the San Diego Opera, Pacific Chamber Orchestra, Three's Company Dancers, and the San Diego Symphony.
- Performed jointly with other gay and lesbian arts groups, including: San Diego Women's Chorus, Gay Men's Chorus of Los Angeles, Turtle Creek Chorale, Portland Lesbian Choir, South Coast Chorale from Orange County, Desert Voices from Tucson, Long Beach Men's Chorus, Orlando Gay Chorus, San Francisco Gay Men's Chorus, and America's Finest City Freedom Band.
- Received artistic grants from the National Endowment for the Arts, Combined Arts and Educational Council (COMBO), City of San Diego Commission for Arts and Culture, and the State of California.
- Performed in Heartstrings: An Event in Three Acts in 1990 and Heartstrings: The AIDS Memorial Quilt and You in 1992 (excerpts from the 1992 performance were shown on national television in the summer of that same year).
- Received Carol Channing's Diamond Award in 1995 for our involvement in DIFFA and fundraising for AIDS Charities.
- Significant events in the late 1990s include singing at the White House during the holiday season, singing and dancing at the Super Bowl pre-game show, and singing at San Diego Padres games.
- In the Summer of 2004, the Chorus made its international debut by performing at the GALA Choruses international choral festival in Montreal, Quebec, Canada in front of thousands of spectators from around the world.
- In the fall of 2005, the Chorus moved into a new permanent performance home, the refurbished 730-seat Birch North Park Theatre. The Chorus operated from an office suite on the second floor of the 1930s building for several years.
- In April 2006, the Chorus presented 20/20 Reflections, a celebration of music from its two-decade past. And in October 2006, the Chorus became the first gay chorus to be featured as mainstage entertainment on a major oceanliner when it presented "On the Good Ship..." on the Diamond Princess operated by Princess Cruises for a manifest 2,600 of passengers.
- In April 2008, the Chorus was the first choral ensemble to perform in the newly renovated Balboa Theatre, operated by the San Diego Civic Theatre, and restored to its 1924 glory after a $20+ million-dollar renovation. The Chorus welcomed American Idol and Broadway star Frenchie Davis for this inaugural performance.
- The Chorus has performed with Carol Channing, Barry Manilow, Nichelle Nichols, and the Grammy-nominated Westwind Brass.

== Giving back ==
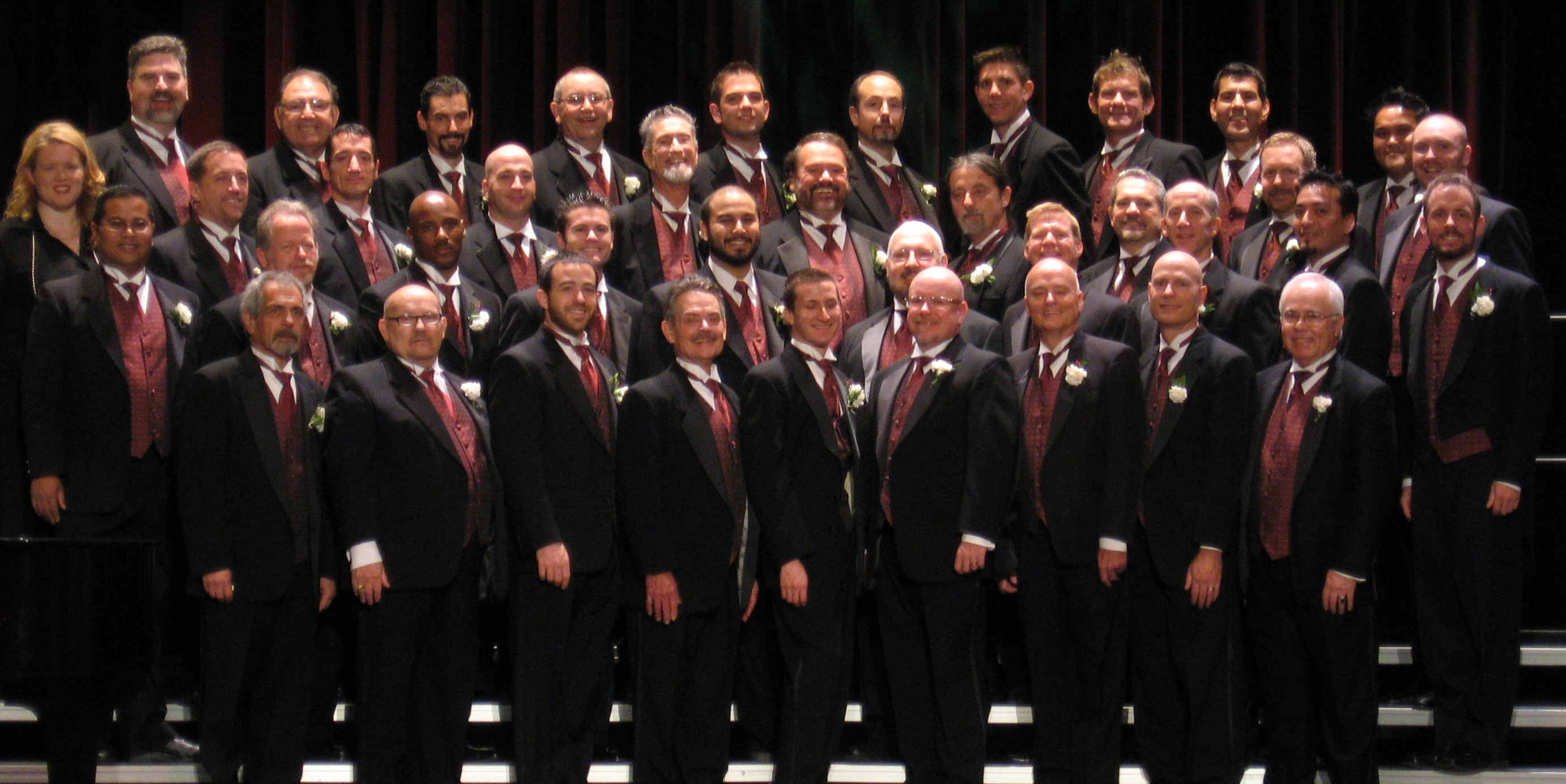

Throughout its history, the San Diego Men's Chorus has made donations of concerts, concert tickets, and money to organizations such as San Diego AIDS Foundation, Auntie Helen's Fluff-n-Fold, Mama's Kitchen, Special Delivery, Human Rights National Committee, Creative Response, San Diego American Indian Health Center, San Diego Hospice, Being Alive-San Diego, Fraternity House, and Positively Speaking. The annual Pride benefit concert performed along with other San Diego area gay & lesbian musical organizations was an enduring tradition for many years.

In June 2007, the Chorus teamed up with the San Diego Chorus of Sweet Adelines International to present "Sing for the Cure". a song cycle chronicling the struggle and survival of breast cancer survivors. The performance included an all-volunteer orchestra and featured celebrity narrator Nichelle Nichols, star of the original Star Trek. The performance was a benefit for the local chapter of Komen for the Cure.

The Chorus initiated a "Youth & Arts" program in Fall 2007, and hosted San Diego County high school students for free music workshops and a preview of its holiday concert, with the assistance of major contributor Qualcomm. The workshops were presented in conjunction with Westwind Brass.

== The end of a legacy ==
In January 2010, The San Diego Men's Chorus formally merged with The Gay Men's Chorus of San Diego, forming a new performing arts entity titled the San Diego Gay Men's Chorus. Each of the two 'legacy' choruses participated under their separate names in a joint holiday concert at San Diego's Balboa Theatre in December 2009. Subsequently, they have been performing as a combined unit under the new name.
