= Golden Gate Men's Chorus =

American Men's choir

Golden Gate Men’s Chorus
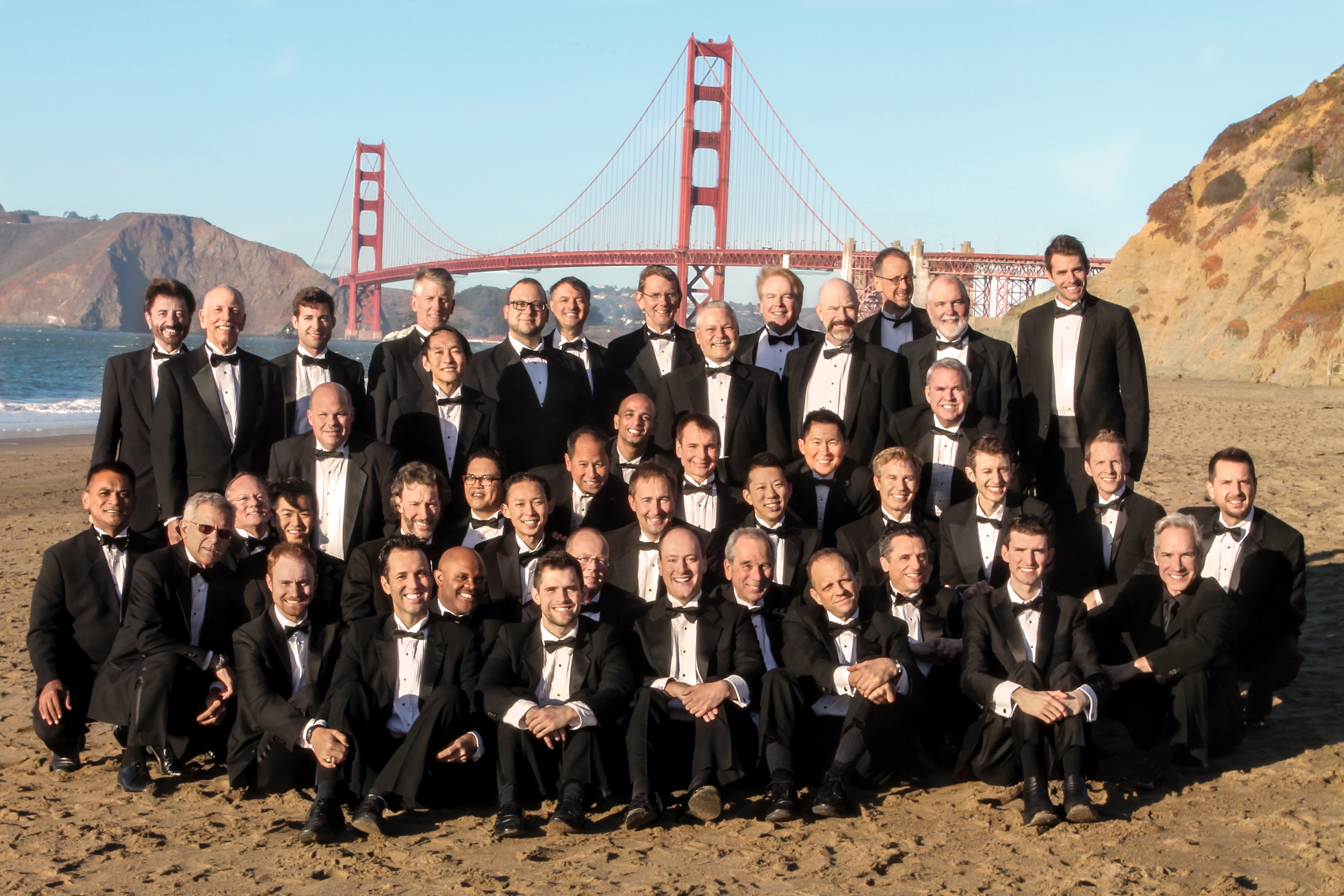
- San Francisco, California (2013)

Background information
- Also known as: GGMC
- Origin: San Francisco, California, United States
- Genre: Choral
- Occupations: Men's Choir
- Instruments: 40 voices
- Years active: 1982-present
- Label: Self-produced
- Members: Music Director; Joseph Piazza; CEO; Richard Rosser; CFO; Randall Kikukawa; Secretary; Lawrence Novida
- Website: www.ggmc.org

Golden Gate Men's Chorus (GGMC) is a San Francisco-based choral ensemble founded in 1982. Rooted in the city's LGBTQ+ community, GGMC is a group of 40 individuals that brings together singers of diverse ethnic backgrounds, gender identities, sexual orientations, and generations. While maintaining its tradition of performing music primarily written for lower voices, GGMC fosters an inclusive environment that welcomes LGBTQ+ people and allies of all genders and sexual orientations. The GGMC presents spring, summer, and winter programs annually, in addition to numerous guest and community benefit performances throughout the year.

== History ==
=== Early years ===
In August, 1982, GGMC founder Dick Kramer put out word (and posters) that he was forming a new group, to be called the Dick Kramer Gay Men's Chorale. He envisioned a small men's ensemble of around 40, reminiscent of university men's choruses of 19th century Europe. The new chorale rehearsed at Dick's home for its first couple years, before finding a home, first at St. Francis Lutheran Church in San Francisco, and in 1996 at St. Matthew's Lutheran Church, where it now rehearses and performs. The chorale performed three sets annually, with each set consisting of 3-4 performances in San Francisco, San Mateo, Marin, Alameda and/or Contra Costa counties. The chorale also did regular joint performances with the Temescal GMC (Oakland), Liedermann Chorus (now Silicon Valley GMC), Contra Costa Chorale, VOICES Lesbian Chorus, Lesbian/Gay Chorus of San Francisco, and San Francisco Gay Men's Chorus, as well as participating in the annual Pride Concert. The DKGMC was also a founding member of the new organization, GALA Choruses (Gay and Lesbian Association of Choruses), in 1983 (and has been represented in every GALA festival to date).

From its first performances in 1982, the DKGMC was well received by the local press and San Francisco audiences, and received favorable reviews for its programming and performances. In addition, the DKGMC was featured regularly at the Cable Car Awards, both as performer and award recipient, and sang for the opening of Harvey Milk Plaza in San Francisco's Castro neighborhood.

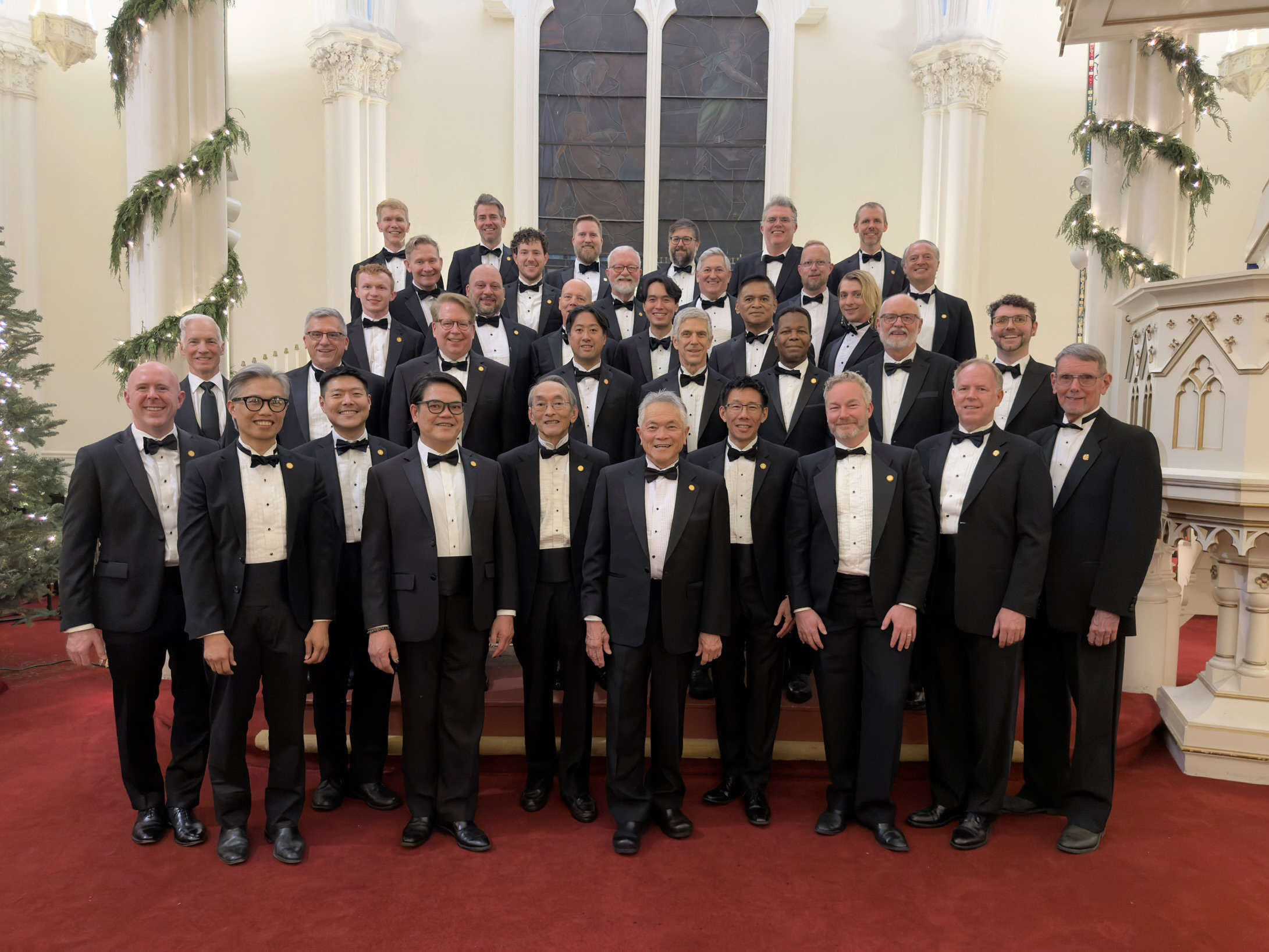
GGMC 2025

=== Early performances ===
Major performances of the period include: full-scale production of Benjamin Britten's "The Burning Fiery Furnace" (1984), Giuseppe Verdi "Requiem (Verdi)" (1985, with the Contra Costa Chorale), Carl Orff "Carmina Burana (Orff)" (1986, with Contra Costa Chorale). The Britten performance was rebroadcast nationally, as well as in Europe and Australia. The DKGMC was among 17 choruses at the second GALA Choruses festival in Minneapolis in 1986, and shared the stage with the Denver Women's Chorus in a special joint performance of Schubert's "Mass in G," the first large mixed choral performance at a GALA festival. After almost six years as music director, in April 1988, Dick Kramer conducted his farewell concert of Kurt Weill's "Berliner Requiem."

== The Golden Gate Men's Chorus ==
The DKGMC was reorganized as the Golden Gate Men's Chorus, in 1988. After several interim directors, William Garcia Ganz was appointed in 1991. During his four-year tenure, the GGMC produced three full concerts of all-American composers, as well as two concerts in conjunction with the Society of Gay and Lesbian Composers of new works by local lesbian and gay composers. The GGMC also performed joint reciprocal holiday concerts with the Sacramento Gay Men's Chorus in San Francisco and Sacramento (1990,1991) and with Slavyanka Russian Chorus in San Francisco and Santa Clara (1994, 1995).

In 1996, Joseph Jennings (then Artistic Director of Chanticleer (ensemble) was appointed as music director. During his 13-year tenure, the GGMC achieved a high level of artistic quality, attracted a steady flow of musicians as new members, and expanded its audience and donor base.

=== Recordings and Performances ===
The GGMC has released five recorded albums, Loving Again (2000), recorded at Skywalker Ranch in Marin; MASS (2003), Tidings of Comfort and Joy (2006), 30 (2012), and Out of the Deep (2016) all recorded at Saint Ignatius Church (San Francisco). Since 1999, the GGMC has been supported by annual grants from the San Francisco Grants for the Arts. Included among its regular season performances, the GGMC has produced two major staged productions of cabaret music "Love Changes Everything" (1997,1998), a three-month tour of San Francisco historic sites "Now We Sing the City" (including SF City Hall) (1999), a joint performance to a full house at Grace Cathedral, San Francisco with the London Gay Men's Chorus and Le Choeur Int'l Gai de Paris (2000), eight major orchestral sacred concerts, and hosted the Harvard Glee Club in its first joint performance with a gay men's chorus (2004).

=== Collaborations and Commissions ===
In May 2010, the Golden Gate Men's Chorus announced the appointment of Joseph Piazza as music director. Under his leadership, the GGMC celebrated its 30th anniversary in 2012 with the recording "30"; has presented collaborative performances with the San Francisco Symphony, the Peninsula Women's Chorus, Singers Marin, the Lesbian/Gay Chorus of San Francisco, the San Francisco Choral Society, the Piedmont East Bay Children's Choir, the San Francisco Girls Chorus, the San Francisco Boys Chorus, the Ragazzi Boys Chorus, and Na Lei Hulu I Ka Wekiu; and has premiered commissions by David Conte, Steven Sametz, David Del Tredici, Eric Whitacre, William Hawley, Josu Elberdin, Vytautas Miškinis, Leonard Enns, Ivo Antognini, Kirby Shaw, Anders Paulsson, Philip Lawson, Ēriks Ešenvalds, Stephen Main, and Fredrik Sixten. The GGMC's small ensemble, Counterpoint, was invited to perform at the American Choral Directors Association(ACDA) Western Division conference in Santa Barbara in February 2014.

=== International Awards ===
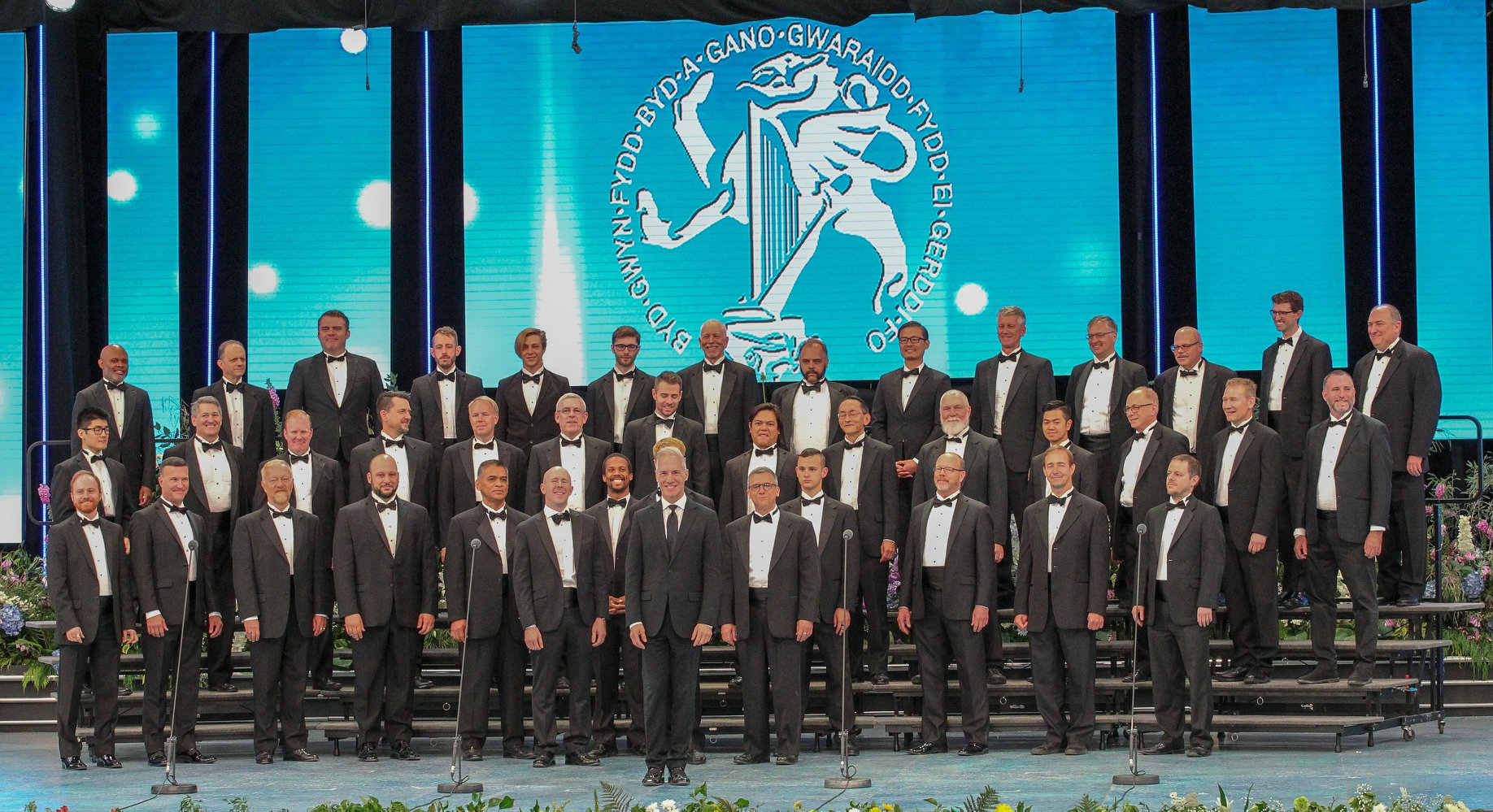
GGMC at the Llangollen International Musical Eisteddfod 2018

In July 2014, the Golden Gate Men's Chorus participated in the 8th World Choir Games in Riga, Latvia, where the chorus was awarded gold medals in the "Musica Sacra with accompaniment" and "Male Choirs" Champions Competitions, and a silver medal in the "Spiritual" Champions Competition. In November 2016, the Golden Gate Men's Chorus participated in the Golden State Choral Trophy in Monterey, CA, where the chorus was named category winner for male choruses and awarded a gold medal diploma. In July 2018, the Golden Gate Men's Chorus toured the United Kingdom, performing in the Brighton Royal Pavilion Music Room, Christ Church Cathedral, Oxford, and the Bath Abbey; before competing at the Llangollen International Musical Eisteddfod in Wales, where the chorus took 1st place in the Adult Folk Song Choir competition and small ensemble, Counterpoint, took 3rd place in the International Acapella Group competition.

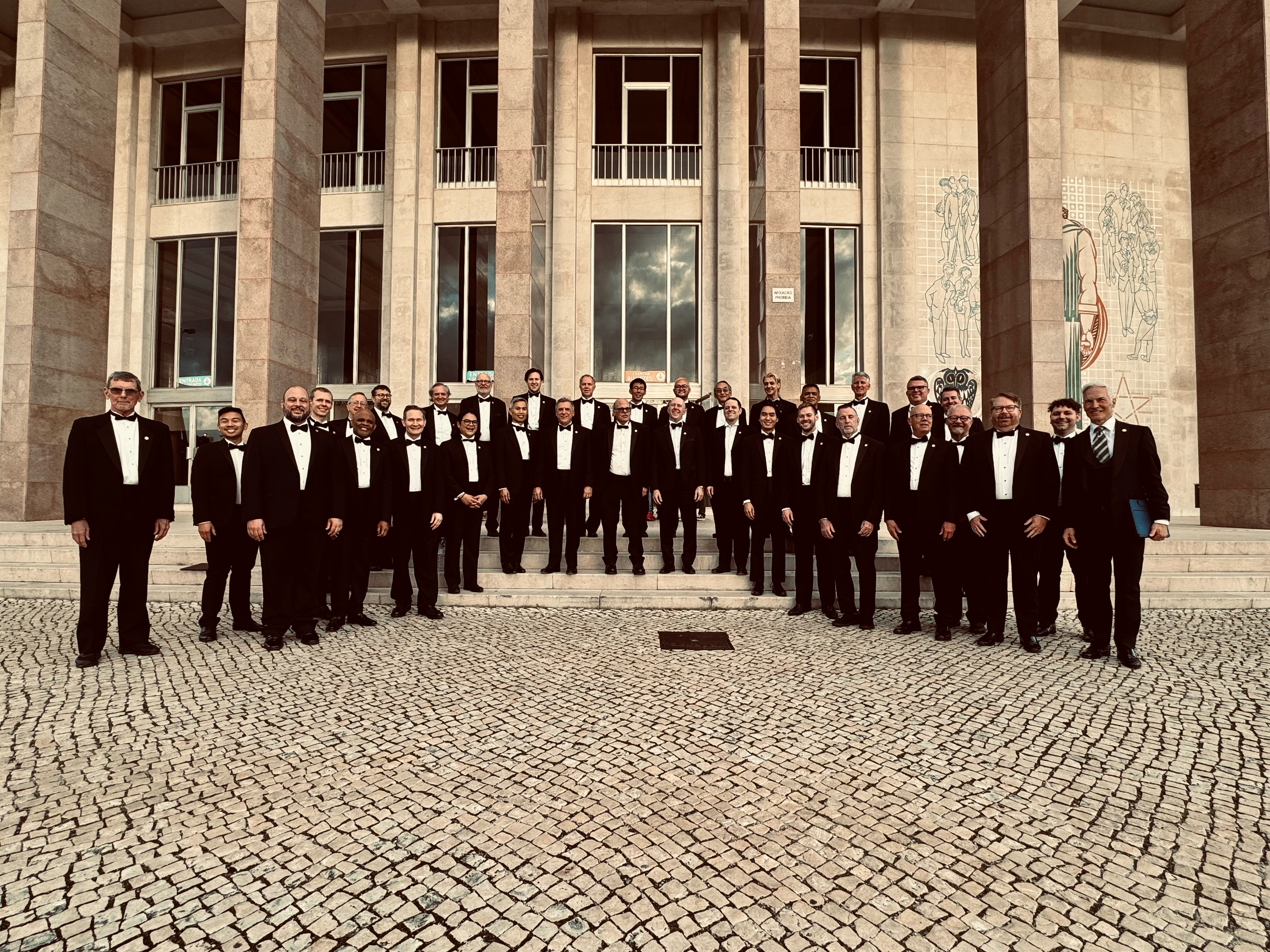
GGMC at Lisbon Sings 2023

In November 2023, the Golden Gate Men’s Chorus participated in Lisbon Sings in Lisbon, Portugal, where the chorus was awarded gold medal diplomas in the "Choirs of equal voices" and the "Folklore" categories, and small ensemble, Counterpoint, was awarded a silver medal diploma in the "Sacred Choral Music" category. In July 2026, the Golden Gate Men’s Chorus participated in the 8th Tokyo International Choir Competition, where the chorus was awarded gold prizes in the “Equal Voice Choir” and “Folklore Music” categories, and small ensemble, Counterpoint, was awarded a gold prize in the "Chamber Choir" category. The chorus was also given the “Audience Choice Award” by a vote of audience members.

== Discography ==
- Loving Again (2000)
- Mass (2003)
- Tidings of Comfort and Joy (2006)
- 30 (2012)
- Out of the Deep (2016)

== Music Directors ==
- Dick Kramer, Founder (Aug 1982 - Apr 1988)
- J. Stephan Repasky (interim) (May 1988 - Dec 1988)
- Walter Thomas (Jan 1989 - Dec 1989)
- Charles Symes (interim) (Jan 1990 - May 1990, Sep 1990 - Dec 1990)
- Anthony Pasqua (May 1990 - Aug 1990)
- William Garcia Ganz (Jan 1991 - Dec 1994, Jul 1995 - Sep 1995)
- Martha Stoddard (Jan 1995 - Jun 1995, Oct 1995 - Dec 1995)
- William Garcia Ganz and Martha Stoddard (Jan 1996 - Jul 1996)
- Joseph Jennings (Aug 1996 - Sep 2009)
- Anthony Pasqua (interim) (Oct 2009 - Dec 2009)
- Joseph Piazza (Jan 2010 - current)

== Affiliations ==
- Chorus America
- GALA Choruses (Gay and Lesbian Association of Choruses)
