= Vancouver Men's Chorus =

Gay choir in Vancouver

The Vancouver Men's Chorus is a non-profit choir. Composed of gay men and their friends, the chorus is a member of the Vancouver Cultural Alliance, the British Columbia Choral Federation and of GALA Choruses, an association of over one hundred men's, women's, and mixed choruses from the United States, Canada, Europe and Australia.

== VMC history ==
In 1981, the world's first gay choir, the San Francisco Gay Men's Chorus, toured the United States, and several men from Vancouver drove the three hours south to Seattle to hear them. On their return, they decided to start a chorus of their own, and they performed their first concert in December of that same year as Canada's first gay chorus. The Vancouver Men's Chorus was a founding member of the Gay And Lesbian Association of Choruses (GALA Choruses), making that organization international from its inception.

Under the continuing direction of conductor Willi Zwozdesky, the VMC has achieved national recognition through performances across Canada -- in the nation's capital, and in Toronto, Calgary, Edmonton, Victoria, Nanaimo, Winnipeg, Montreal, St. John's, and Halifax. Radio play of their recordings -- Signature (1992), Making Spirits Bright (1994), Elements (2002), Encore (2006), and Making Spirits Bright Again (2008) -- has also increased the choir's national exposure.

In 1991, The Canada Council recognized the chorus for its artistry, and in 1994, it was selected as one of five national finalists in the CBC Amateur Choir Competition. In 19 , the chorus recorded J. Douglas Dodd's Symphony of Sound and Light with the Vancouver Symphony Orchestra, Elektra Women's Choir, and the Vancouver Children's Choir for broadcast on Parliament Hill during the summer months. They collaborated with the VSO and Elektra again in an outdoor concert featuring Dame Kiri Te Kanawa ( ), and joined Chor Leoni Men's Choir and the VSO for a rare performance of Franz Liszt's Faust Symphony in 20 .

As an organization, the Chorus has been tireless in creating new repertoire for men's voices. Custom-made arrangements by Willi Zwozdesky, Stephen Smith, Absalon Figueroa, Nico Rhodes, Brian Tate, Ira Rogers, and other Canadian arrangers have been central to VMC programming; and original works have been commissioned from British Columbia composers Michael Conway Baker, Ramona Luengen, Anita Perry, Rupert Lang, Tony Strangis, Nicholas Ryan Kelly, Zach Singer, Stephen Smith, and Willi Zwozdesky, and Ontario composers Eleanor Daley and Mark Sirett. Additionally, the Chorus has frequently joined with other men's choruses in the GALA network to commission new works. These include Alan Shorter's setting of the children's story Oliver Button is a Sissy, Ola Gjeilo's "New Year's Carol", and Julian Hornik's @QueerZ.

== Sub group ==
=== Synergy ===
In October 1998, a small ensemble of the VMC called Synergy was formed by the chorus's resident accompanist, Stephen Smith. Over the next 15 seasons, the select 12-voice a cappella group became known for finely-honed performances of eclectic and often challenging repertoire in many languages and "in styles ranging from renaissance to jazz and from motets to Motown" (as their publicity material put it).

In addition to regular appearances in VMC main-stage concerts, Synergy performed at festivals in Chicago (1999), San Jose (2001), Toronto (2002), Montreal (2004), London UK (2009), Winnipeg (2010) and Denver (2016); in self-produced concerts with guests Synchronicity (2000), Pastime With Good Company (2002), Bryant Olender (2005) and Colla Voce (2009); as guests of Pandora's Vox (2001) and the Rainbow Concert Band (2003) in Vancouver, and Colla Voce (2011) in San Francisco; in benefits for gay and lesbian organizations in Victoria (2004) and Kamloops (2001, 2002, 2005, 2007); at VoxFest (2003, 2008); and at scores of parties, weddings, community events, and fundraisers. For many years running they entertained holiday shoppers in Pacific Centre and welcomed guests at the Hotel Vancouver's Dickens Buffet; and in 2011 and 2012, they led Christmas carol singalongs at St. Paul's church in Vancouver's West End.

In 2008, to mark their 10th season, they released a CD entitled Synergy: Songs of Nature, Love, and Celebration. The group's final performance was on July 28, 2013, at the wedding of two of its members.

== Discography ==
- Signature (1992)
- Making Spirits Bright (1994)
- Elements (2002)
- Encore (2006)
- Making Spirits Bright Again (2008)

== Outreach concerts ==
The VMC performs in the community at benefits, conferences, and other occasions that fall within its mandate, and has also given full-length concerts in BC towns and cities, such as:

- Nanaimo (2009)
- Port Coquitlam (2008)
- Surrey (2007)
- Saltspring Island (2006)
- Victoria (2005)
