= Heartland Men's Chorus =

Gay men's Chorus

- Also known as: HMC or HMCKC
- Origin: Kansas City, Missouri, United States
- Genres: Choral, jazz, popular, musical
- Occupation: Men's Choir
- Instrument: 150 voices
- Years active: 1986-present
- Label: Self-produced
- Members: Artistic Director; Shawn Cullen; Executive Director; Dudley Hogue; Principal Accompanist; Lamar Sims
- Website: www.hmckc.org

Heartland Men's Chorus (HMC) is a gay men's chorus located in Kansas City. Founded in 1986, and currently featuring more than 150 singing members, HMC performs an annual concert series to live audiences in excess of 6,700 at its performance home, the Folly Theater. In addition to its subscription concert series, HMC regularly performs community outreach, reaching an estimated 8,000 additional audience members. The Chorus is a 501(c)(3) not-for-profit organization and, as a performing force, is the largest men's chorus in the region. In terms of infrastructure and budget, HMC is the largest community chorus in the region. HMC is also the oldest cultural institution serving the LGBT community in the region.

== Early years ==
In 1986, a small group of men had a dream of forming a choral group in Kansas City. After much discussion and planning, their efforts led to the formation of the Chorus, which had its debut concert on December 14 of that year. The first concert, featuring 30 men, was dedicated to the memory of their friend Brian McLothlin.

== Performance Highlights ==
Over the years, the Chorus has reached out by performing in a host of area venues, singing in churches, theaters, nightclubs, parks and union halls. The Chorus has sung for the opening gala of a traveling exhibit of the Smithsonian Institution and a national signature event of the Lewis and Clark Expedition bicentennial, A Journey Fourth.
In order to reach beyond the Greater Kansas City area, the Chorus has performed elsewhere in the two-state area including Columbia, Joplin, Springfield and Maryville in Missouri and in Baldwin City, Lawrence, Topeka, and Wichita in Kansas.
Outside the two-state area, the Chorus has sung with GALA member choruses at their home sites of St. Louis, Chicago, Washington, D.C., and Dallas. In 2002, an international tour took members to London, Paris and Hamburg, Germany, where they shared the stage with other GALA Choruses.
In addition, the Chorus has performed at five quadrennial festivals of GALA Choruses. Festival experiences have allowed the Chorus to perform in Denver, CO; Tampa, FL; San Jose, CA; Montreal, Quebec, Canada, and most recently Miami, FL for GALA Festival 2008.
The Chorus has reached out through Martin Luther King Day observances, Harmony in a World of Difference events and AIDS awareness events. The Chorus joined with the Women's Chorus of Dallas to present Sing for the Cure, a benefit that raised $12,000 for Susan G. Komen for the Cure.
In recent years, the Chorus has presented two family matinee concerts, featuring pieces based on works by internationally renowned children's author Tomie dePaola. In 2003, the Chorus performed on the Folly Theater Children's Series, presenting music to two sold-out houses of school children.
Since 1994, the Chorus has produced nine CDs, as well as two DVDs of concert events: The Few, the Proud, featuring Col. Margarethe Cammermeyer as narrator, and All God's Children, featuring the Rev. Dr. Mel White of Soulforce as narrator.

== Commissioned works ==
Since 2002 alone, the Chorus has commissioned three major works: Two Flutes Playing, by Kansas City composer Mark Hayes, a major work featuring orchestra and dance; and Country Angel Christmas, based on a children's book by Tomie dePaola. In 2005, the Chorus joined with the Gay Men's Chorus of Los Angeles to co-commission Life is a Cabaret, a concert tribute to the songwriting team of John Kander and Fred Ebb. In addition, the Chorus joined with other GALA Choruses in commissioning Oliver Button is a Sissy, a half-hour musical based on another book by dePaola. Under the direction of Shawn Cullen, HMC has built a collaborative creative relationship with Grammy-nominated composer/arranger/orchestrator David Maddux, having commissioned the world premieres of The Music of Whitney Houston (2022) and After All: 60 Years of Cher (2023). In 2024 the chorus worked with David Maddux and leadership from the Folly Theater to produce a world premiere children's musical, My Shadow Is Pink, based on the book by Scott Stuart The Chorus also has commissioned several song arrangements, featuring the talents of Eric Lane Barnes, Mark Hayes, Scott Farthing, and Paul Siskind.

== Leadership ==
The first conductor of the Chorus was Father Ambrose Karels, followed by co-directors Rande Stewart and Stephen Johnson. The late Gina Scaggs Epifano was the first paid director of the Chorus. Among GALA Chorus directors, she was one of the first women to conduct a men's chorus. She was followed by Reuben Reynolds III, who directed the Chorus from 1990 to 1998. In his tenure, the Chorus moved to the Folly Theater as its performance home and broadened its scope and reach.
It was under his leadership that in 1998 the Chorus received the GLAAD (Gay and Lesbian Alliance Against Defamation) Award for its outstanding achievements as an arts organization and for its highly visible presence in the Kansas City gay and lesbian community.
From 1998 to 2013, the Chorus was under the direction of artistic director Dr. Joseph P. Nadeau. Under his leadership, the Chorus has expanded its number of subscription performances and performed at the national conference of the American Choral Directors Association. Dustin S. Cates was named the new artistic director beginning with the 2014–2015 season.

Shawn Cullen was appointed Interim Artistic Director for the 2019–2020 season and named permanent Artistic Director/Conductor in 2020. Cullen's previous appointments include Artistic Director/Conductor of the Reveille Men's Chorus in Tucson, AZ and Desert Voices Mixed Chorus also in Tucson, AZ. Rick Fisher, who became executive director in 1997, retired in 2022 after serving the organization for 25 years. Rick holds the distinction of being the longest-serving executive director of a single chorus within the GALA Choruses network. In 2022, Dudley Hogue was appointed as the Executive Director of the Heartland Men's Chorus with former leadership including the role of executive director of The New York City Gay Men's Chorus, interim executive director of GALA Choruses, as well as executive director of The Kansas City Women's Chorus. On the official level, the Board of Directors and its committees (Development, Finance, Human Resources, Board Development, Membership Services, and GALA Fund-raising) make decisions for the long-range development of the Chorus.http://hmckc.org/History

== Discography ==
- Freedom (2010)
- Quest Unending (2008)
- A New December (2005)
- Heartland Pride (2004)
- Let Heaven and Nature Swing (2003)
- Two Flutes Playing (2002)
- Voices from the Heart (2002)
- A Kansas City Legacy (2000)
- With Love from the Heartland (1998)
- A Song for Christmas (1994, reissued 2005)

== Affiliations ==
- American Choral Directors Association (ACDA)
- Chorus America
- GALA Choruses (Gay and Lesbian Association of Choruses)
