= Boston Gay Men's Chorus =

Vocalist group in Massachusetts, US

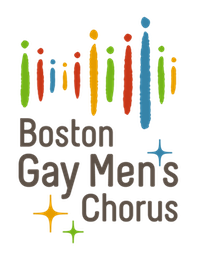

Background information
- Also known as: BGMC
- Born: Valentines Day 1982 (February 14)
- Origin: Boston, Massachusetts
- Genres: classical, new music, Broadway, show tunes, popular, choral
- Occupation: Men’s Choir
- Instrument: 300+ voices
- Years active: 1982 - Present
- Members: Music Director; Reuben M. Reynolds III Executive Director; Sarah Shoffner Principal Accompanist and Assistant Music Director; Chad Weirick American Sign Language Interpreter; Dr. LeWana Clark President of the Board of Directors, Bay State Performing Arts, Inc. Alfred O’Connell
- Website: www.bgmc.org

The Boston Gay Men's Chorus is a group of vocalists located in Boston, Massachusetts. The group currently has over 300 members and has been directed by Conductor Reuben Reynolds for over 20 years. The group is heard by over 10,000 audience members per season and has performed across the globe. The chorus performs songs from a wide variety of genres and song selections have been described as "hopeful and optimistic". The chorus has had over 1,600 members during its history and has performed at Carnegie Hall, Symphony Hall, and Jordan Hall.

== History ==
The Boston Gay Men's Chorus was founded in 1982 and began with between 50 and 60 members. Their first performance was part of Boston's Gay Pride Week in the same year. In December 1982, the group performed their first annual holiday concert which attracted over 900 audience members. The group claims to have originally assembled for "aesthetic rather than political purposes," as was described by former Director Lee Ridgeway in an interview.

In March 1992, the chorus celebrated its tenth anniversary with a concert at Boston Symphony Hall with the Denver and Washington D.C. gay men's choruses. The chorus was under the direction of Conductor Robert Barney and had approximately 100 members. For this performance, the chorus commissioned Composer Daniel Pinkham's "Down an Amherst Path."

== Performance highlights ==
=== U.S. Conference of Mayors, June 8–11, 2018 ===
The chorus performed at the United States Conference of Mayors which took place in Boston during Pride Week. This marks the chorus's first time singing at a political gathering. Music Director Reuben M. Reynolds III commented, “coming at the end of Boston Pride Week, this also sets a wonderful example for mayors from around the country of what it means for a city to be truly inclusive of its LGBT community."

=== BGMC and Mzansi Gay Choir, Johannesburg South Africa, June 15, 2018 ===
The Boston Gay Men's Chorus performed with the Mzansi Gay Choir, which formed in 2015 and is one of the newest gay men's choruses. The joint concert served as a benefit for the Kliptown Youth Program. This performance was part of a larger tour of South Africa during which the Boston Gay Men's Chorus raised money for causes such as HIV/AIDS awareness and support of LGBT youth and asylum seekers.

=== George's first gay pride parade, Winter 2018 ===
As part of their tour of South Africa, the Boston Gay Men's Chorus participated in George's first gay pride parade.

=== The College of the Holy Cross, April 2, 2016 ===
This concert was the first time a gay men's chorus had been invited by a Catholic institution to perform. However, this milestone was achieved by accident, the organizing professor was not aware this was the case when he arranged the concert, he simply wanted the students in his "Music and Gay Rights" class to see a performance by a gay men's chorus.

=== First gay chorus to tour the Middle East, summer 2015 ===
The Boston Gay Men's Chorus was the first chorus to tour the Middle East with performances in Ein Gedi, a Kibbutz in Israel, Jerusalem, Tel Aviv, and Istanbul. During the tour, the chorus performed a new composition by Joshua Shank titled "Peace." This piece addressed LGBT equality more directly than most of the other pieces in the chorus's repertoire. Chorus member, Kilian Melloy, reported that the group's reception in the Middle East was widely positive, although the permit for the gay pride parade in Istanbul was revoked and the event was cancelled. Although the chorus's planned concert at the Zorlu PSM was cancelled, it performed a free outdoor concert at Boğaziçi University's South Campus on June 27, 2015.

=== Governor Charlie Baker's First Inaugural Ball, January 8, 2015 ===
This was the first time a gay men's chorus has performed at the inauguration of any republican Governor.

=== First gay chorus to perform in Poland, 2005 ===
The BGMC was the first gay chorus to perform in Poland. This sparked protest in the country, but the chorus was still able to perform for a sold-out crowd while under police guard.

=== First performance of a gay chorus with a high school chorus, Belmont, MA, 2004 ===
The BGMC performed with the Belmont High School Chorus in the first performance of its kind. The concert took place in Governor Mitt Romney's Massachusetts hometown and highlighted the debate over gay marriage that was taking place at the time. The concert received a standing ovation and demonstrated the generational difference in opinion that existed surrounding gay marriage.

== Music Directors and Conductors ==
- Reuben M. Reynolds, III, Music Director (1997–Present)
- Ellen Oak, Guest Conductor (February–March 2008 & September–December 1998)
- Robert Barney, Music Director (1985 - 1997)
- Lee Ridgway, Music Director (1982 - 1985)
- Josef Bevins, Music Director (1982 - 1982)

== Notable Guest Artists ==
Nick Adams, Nancy Armstrong, soprano, Laura Benanti, Nell Carter, Ann Hampton Callaway, Lea DeLaria, Linda Eder, D’Anna Fortunato, Sutton Foster, Todrick Hall, James Maddalena, Katharine McPhee, Alex Newell, Faith Prince, Stephen Schwartz, Fenwick Smith, Lillias White.

== Recordings ==
The Chorus has produced eleven recordings; all of which are available at Amazon, iTunes, and other online outlets for digital download.

- Joy, 2010
- In Need of Music, 2009
- Live in Poland, 2005
- Here to Stay: The Music of George Gershwin, 2005
- Best of the BGMC Live, 2004; nominee, 2005 Outmusic Award
- Razzle Dazzle: The Broadway Hits of Kander & Ebb, 2003; nominee, ‘04 Outmusic Award
- Gloria!, 2001; winner, 2002 Outmusic Award, “Outstanding New Recording-Chorus”
- Eos, 2000
- Oz and Beyond: The Music of Harold Arlen, 1999
- Freedom, Merriment & Joy, 1996
- Visions: Words for the Future, 1994

Recordings are now captured through video and are published BGMC's YouTube page. There are over 350+ videos available with 1.5 million views annually.

== Awards ==
=== 2017 ===
The group was awarded The Boston Foundation for Equality Fund Grant, a $10,000 award which the organization plans to use to adapt "A Peacock Among Pigeons," an LGBT themed children's book, into a stage production.

=== 2016 ===
The chorus was awarded the Massachusetts Nonprofit Network's 2016 Excellence Award in Communications, an award that annually recognizes a nonprofit which successfully uses communication strategies to advance its mission. The group was honored as a result of their 2015 tour of the Middle East which "showcased the organization as an agent of social change and demonstrated that music performed by an openly gay male choral group can move audiences to a deeper understanding of LGBT people."

== International tours ==
- On June 11, 2018, 125 members of the Boston Gay Men’s Chorus flew to Johannesburg, South Africa to kick off BGMC's South Africa Tour (2018)
- On June 18, 2015, 113 members of the Boston Gay Men’s Chorus flew to Ein Gedi, Israel to kick off BGMC's Middle East Tour (2015)
- On June 22, 2005, 120 members of the Boston Gay Men’s Chorus flew to Berlin, Germany to kick off BGMC's first European Tour (2005)

== Backlash ==
=== Istanbul, 2015 ===
During their tour of the Middle East, the BGMC was forced to find a new venue for their performance in Istanbul after the original venue backed out of its agreement to host as a result of public outcry. The chorus was able to find an alternative venue at Bosphorus University. The following day, the Istanbul pride parade was cancelled and chorus members who planned to march were turned away by riot police.

=== Poland, 2005 ===
When performing in Poland in 2005, the chorus was forced to seek additional security as a result of protests surrounding their performance.

=== New Hampshire and Vermont, 1992 ===
In 1992, over 10 years after the chorus's founding, they experienced their first confrontation from protestors in St. Johnsbury, Vermont. About forty protestors assembled outside of the North Congregational Church, one of ten churches who sponsored the performance as part of the AIDS Community Awareness Project. In addition, The Caledonian-Record, a southern Vermont paper published an editorial piece and two advertisements denouncing the performance. During the same tour, a New Hampshire paper, The Dartmouth Review published an editorial piece in which it referred to the chorus as a "traveling sodomy circus." These protests came shortly after Vermont Governor Howard Dean signed a gay rights bill into law.
