= Philadelphia Gay Men's Chorus =

LGBT choral group in Philadelphia, PA

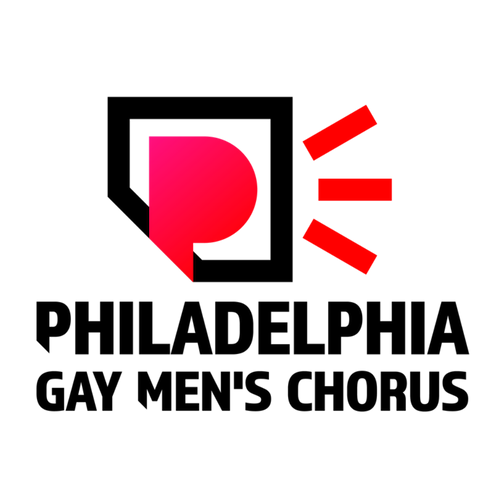

Background information
- Also known as: PGMC
- Origin: Philadelphia, Pennsylvania, USA
- Genres: Broadway, choral, classical, jazz, popular
- Occupation: Men's chorus
- Instrument: 150+ voices
- Years active: 1981–present
- Members: Current Artistic Director; Michael Semancik (2024-Present); Former Artistic Directors; Joseph J. Buches (2004-2024)
- Website: www.pgmc.org

The Philadelphia Gay Men's Chorus (PGMC) is a choral organization in Philadelphia, Pennsylvania. Founded in 1981, it is one of the oldest gay men's choruses in the United States, and is a cultural fixture in Philadelphia. The Chorus is affiliated with the Gay and Lesbian Association of Choruses (GALA). The Chorus has performed with the Rainbow Chorale of Delaware, Anna Crusis Women's Choir, Phialdelpha Voices of Pride (PVOP) and has participated in several GALA festivals. The chorus is currently under the artistic direction of Michael Semancik, who served as interim Artistic Director before being elected to the position full-time in February 2025, succeeding former director Joseph J. Buches, who retired in May 2024 after 20 years of service.

== History ==
The Philadelphia Gay Men's Chorus traces its history to 1981, when founder Gerald Davis and three other members toured Philly's gay bars at Christmastime, singing carols. The chorus gave its first official concert performance on April 25, 1982, at the DCA club (now Voyeur) in Philadelphia.

PGMC grew modestly but steadily throughout the 1980s. In 1987, it performed outside Philadelphia for the first time in a joint concert with the Baltimore Gay Men's Chorus. Three years later, PGMC performed for the first time at the historic Academy of Music along with "HeartStrings", a national AIDS benefit concert tour that featured Sandy Duncan and Jason Bateman.

The Chorus incorporated as a non-profit 501(c)(3) charitable organization on July 25, 1990. Throughout the 1990s, membership ranged from 20 to 60 voices as the organization continued to raise its profile in the local performing-arts and gay communities. Among the decade's highlights: the 1992 AIDS benefit concert, "Song for Life", featuring local television celebrity Sally Starr and Juanita Holiday; a performance at the inaugural PrideFest celebration, now Equality Forum, in 1993; and the first joint performance with other gay choruses in the Greater Philadelphia region, featuring singer Marilyn Horne, in 1995.

In December 1997, the chorus became the first LGBT musical group to perform in the Philadelphia City Council chambers in City Hall, and PGMC's small ensemble, Brotherly Love, sang at the dedication of the William Way Community Center, in which the chorus was one of the first tenants.

The new millennium saw continued growth in PGMC's size and prominence. In 2000, the Chorus was asked to perform at an awards ceremony honoring Tony Award-winning British actor Sir Ian McKellen. In 2001, PGMC performed for the first time with Philadelphia's oldest and largest amateur chorus, the Mendelssohn Club of Philadelphia, in a joint performance of Arnold Schoenberg's "A Survivor from Warsaw." PGMC's performance at the dedication of the National Constitution Center on July 4, 2004, aired nationally on C-SPAN. The Philadelphia Phillies invited the chorus to sing the national anthem for Gay Day at Citizens Bank Park in 2005 and more recently on August 28, 2012. In June 2006, PGMC performed for the first time at the Kimmel Center for the Performing Arts to launch its 25th anniversary year. The concert featured the world premiere of "Open Road", PGMC's first exclusively commissioned work, written by composer Dr. Robert Maggio. In the spring of 2007, PGMC traveled to Washington, D.C., for a joint concert with the Gay Men's Chorus of Washington, D.C., and the chorus returned to the Kimmel Center for its June concert that same year. The 2007-08 concert season concluded with "The Circle of Our Lives: Music That Unites", a concert that brought together seven gay, lesbian, and bisexual choruses from throughout the tri-state Pennsylvania/New Jersey/Delaware region.

PGMC's first broadcast performance occurred in December 2008, when Brotherly Love performed a song from PGMC's 2008 holiday concert on The 10! Show on NBC10 (WCAU Philadelphia).

The chorus has participated in every quadrennial GALA Choruses Festival since GALA Festival III in Seattle in 1988. At GALA Festival 2008 in Miami, PGMC performed "Open Road" for the first time outside Philadelphia.

== Recordings ==
In 1997, the Chorus produced its first commercial recording, The Spirit Says Sing. In April 2006, the Chorus produced a second recording, entitled Open Road, featuring the commissioned piece of the same title by composer Dr. Robert Maggio. December 2007 saw the release of Holiday Delights, PGMC's first collection of songs celebrating Christmas, Hanukkah, and Kwanzaa.
