= Seattle Men's Chorus =

- Also known as: SMC
- Origin: Seattle, Washington, U.S.
- Genres: Broadway, choral, classical, jazz, popular
- Instrument: 275 voices
- Years active: 1979-present
- Members: Artistic Director; Paul Caldwell; Executive Director; Craig Coogan
- Website: Official website

Seattle Men's Chorus (SMC) is an LGBTQ community chorus based in Seattle, Washington. The group was founded in 1979, and today is, along with Seattle Women's Chorus, the largest community choral organization in North America. SMC is a member of GALA Choruses and Chorus America.

SMC has been led by conductor and artistic director, Paul Caldwell, since 2016.

== History ==
The first rehearsal was held in September 1979. In the spring of 1980, the first official SMC concert was held at the Museum of History and Industry.

Dennis Coleman became SMC's conductor in May 1981.

SMC became a founding member of the GALA Choruses when it was incorporated in July 1983.

On the 25th anniversary of Stonewall, the SMC marched in the New York City Pride Parade and sang with the New York City Chorus at Carnegie Hall.

== Performances ==
SMC performs several regularly scheduled concerts each year, regularly hosting celebrity guests such as Kristin Chenoweth, Tituss Burgess, Leslie Jordan, Kelli O'Hara, Betty Buckley and Debbie Reynolds, to name but a few.

For director Coleman's last program, the SMC performed "Legacy". Legacy contained two original compositions that honored gay figures: I Am Harvey Milk, written by Andrew Lippa about San Francisco politician and activist Harvey Milk, and the Tyler Suite about Rutgers student Tyler Clementi.

In June 2023, Disney partnered with SMC for Disney PRIDE in Concert at the historic Paramount Theatre.

== Discography ==
- Bustin' Out All Over
- Captured Live!!
- Fruit of the Month Club
- Holiday Traditions
- Home
- Joy
- Over The Rainbow! 2000
- The Pink Album
- Silver Bells
- Snowbound!
- Soul Full
- Swellegant Elegance
- UnderCover
- We Are Family

== See also ==
- GALA Choruses (Gay and Lesbian Association of Choruses)
