= Gay Men's Chorus of Washington, D.C. =

LGBT choral organisation

Gay Men’s Chorus of Washington, D.C.
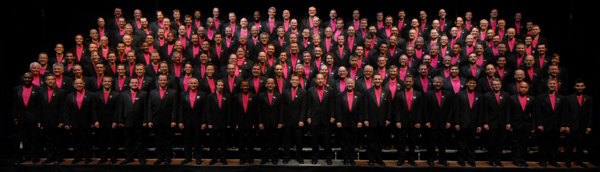
- The Gay Men's Chorus of Washington, DC

Background information
- Also known as: GMCW
- Origin: Washington, D.C., United States
- Genres: Broadway, choral, classical, jazz, popular
- Occupation: Men’s Choir
- Instrument: 300 voices
- Years active: 1981–present
- Members: Artistic Director; Dr. Thea Kano Executive Director; Justin Fyala Assistant Conductor and Director of GenOUT; Dr. C. Paul Heins Principal Accompanist; Dr. Theodore Guerrant Chairman of the Board of Directors, Federal City Performing Arts Association, Inc. Jay Gilliam Chorus President; Micah Yarbrough Production Manager; Chipper Dean
- Website: www.gmcw.org

The Gay Men’s Chorus of Washington, D.C. (GMCW), is one of the oldest LGBT choral organizations in the United States. With more than 300 singing members, it is also one of the largest. The chorus's stated mission is that it "delights audiences and champions gay equality with robust artistry, fun, and surprise." In addition to singing members, GMCW has nearly 100 support volunteers, 400 subscribers, 500 donors and an annual audience of nearly 10,000. The parent organization is the Federal City Performing Arts Association, Inc., and GMCW is a member of GALA Choruses.

The chorus was established in 1981 by enthusiasts of the San Francisco Gay Men’s Chorus who attended a local performance at the Kennedy Center Concert Hall. In the time since its founding, GMCW has performed locally at the Kennedy Center, the National Theatre, the Warner Theatre, DAR Constitution Hall, the Lincoln Theatre and, most frequently, Lisner Auditorium at George Washington University. The chorus performed at President Clinton’s second inauguration in 1997. In 1998, the chorus toured three Scandinavian capitals. While there, GMCW was received by Sweden’s Princess Christina to thank members for singing in support of Noah’s Ark, a Swedish AIDS services organization.

During its 20th-anniversary season in 2000–2001, GMCW performed at Carnegie Hall and Boston’s Symphony Hall in joint concerts with the gay men’s choruses of Boston and New York City. In December 2002, GMCW performed as part of the televised 25th annual Kennedy Center Honors in tribute to Elizabeth Taylor.

The chorus has commissioned original works for men’s chorus, such as Changing Hearts in 2004 and Songs of My Family in 2007. Both works were featured on CD releases subsequent to their inaugural performances on stage.

GMCW performs three subscription concerts annually: holiday-themed (December), spring (March) and summer (June), which opens Washington’s annual week-long Capital Pride celebration. In addition, in 2007 and 2008, the chorus performed a non-subscription concert of classical fare in February, between the holiday and spring concerts. There are occasional smaller, also non-subscription productions, such as an auditioned Cabaret concert in October or November.

The chorus makes appearances at local community events, including programs for PFLAG, Whitman-Walker Clinic and the Human Rights Campaign. The chorus sponsors five small ensembles: Potomac Fever, an a cappella close-harmony group, Rock Creek Singers, a chamber choir, GenOUT, an LGBTQI supportive chorus for DC area youth, Seasons of Love, a gospel choir, and 17th Street Dance, a dance troupe. These ensembles serve as representatives of the larger chorus at community functions, and each produces an annual concert.

The records of the GMCW are cared for by the Special Collections Research Center in the Estelle and Melvin Gelman Library of the George Washington University.

== History ==
Official Gay Men's Chorus of Washington, D.C. logo

June 28, 1981: After the national tour performance of the San Francisco Gay Men’s Chorus at the Kennedy Center 10 days earlier, Marsha Pearson had distributed fliers announcing a meeting to organize a gay men’s chorus. The meeting occurred in the old Gay Community Center at 1469 Church Street in Northwest Washington with 18 men, and the GMCW was born. Jim Richardson became the new organization’s Interim Director with the first rehearsals being held at the center, and later at the First Congregational Church in downtown Washington.

Sept. 23, 1981: At the invitation of D.C. Mayor Marion Barry, GMCW’s debut performance occurred at a reception at the District Building, to mark the opening of the National Gay Task Force’s Washington office (later the NGLTF). Also that month, GMCW established its management umbrella, incorporating the Federal City Performing Arts Association (FCPAA), as a non-profit educational organization whose goal was "to provide first-rate music in performance by and for Washington’s gay and lesbian community and the community-at-large."

Dec. 12, 1981: With nearly 90 members, the chorus performed its first holiday concert, jointly with the DC Area Feminist Chorus and Different Drummers, at the First Congregational Church to a standing-room-only audience of close to 1,000.

March 17, 1982: GMCW’s debut concert – under direction of its first permanent music director, Nick Armstrong – was performed at St. Mark’s Episcopal Church on Capitol Hill. Selections were also performed by GMCW’s two smaller ensembles — the Sine Nomine Singers, a 16-member chamber group and A Few Good Men, a 20-member song-and-dance troupe.

Sept. 9, 1983: The COAST (Come Out And Sing Together) Festival not only marked the first "road trip" for the Chorus outside the Washington-Baltimore area, but also provided the experience of performing in a real concert venue – the Alice Tully Hall at the Lincoln Center. It was also the first national gay choral festival – bringing eleven groups together from around the country – established by the Gay and Lesbian Association of Choruses.

Oct. 8, 1984: GMCW performed at the National Theatre for its "Monday Night at the National" for a mostly straight audience. The Chorus concluded their concert with the gospel-style "Walk Him Up the Stairs", and received a standing ovation.

Dec. 13, 1985: GMCW presented an evening performance of its holiday concert, donating the proceeds of $5,700 to the Whitman-Walker Clinic in its fight against AIDS. (The GMCW Holiday Concert was inaugurated in 1984.)

June 21, 1986: The Chorus celebrated its 5th anniversary by returning to the place of its inspiration – the Concert Hall of the Kennedy Center. DC First Lady Effi Barry read a Mayoral proclamation declaring "Gay Men’s Chorus of Washington Day" and introduced the Chorus.

July 2, 1988: GMCW sang at the funeral of Leonard Matlovich, a decorated Vietnam veteran who was discharged from the Air Force in 1975 for declaring his homosexuality.

Oct. 15, 1989: The Chorus was allowed to participate in the AIDS Healing Service at the Washington National Cathedral under its own name after a significant struggle for recognition. GMCW was asked to participate in the 1988 service, only to have the invitation "rescinded because the Episcopal hierarchy deemed us too 'political'", according to one member. (While they did participate, it was not under the GMCW name.) Chorus leadership pursued the issue in 1989 and the Presiding Bishop of the Episcopal Church yielded.

Jan. 19, 1997: The chorus performed an 11-number set at the Smithsonian Institution’s American History Museum on the eve of the 53rd Presidential Inaugural – the first time a gay choral group was invited to participate in such a national event.

June 28, 1997: On its 16th anniversary of formation, the Chorus was joined by the Indianapolis Men’s Chorus at the Lisner Auditorium to perform the DC premiere of "NakedMan", to which a review noted, "GMCW always produces a slick, highly professional staging."

May 28, 1998: GMCW launched it first overseas tour to Scandinavia, visiting Oslo, Stockholm and Copenhagen. In Stockholm, GMCW was received by Sweden’s Princess Christina, and in Copenhagen, they became the first gay chorus to sing in the Tivoli Gardens concert hall.

April 2, 2001: The Chorus performed at Carnegie Hall as part of their 20th anniversary season joint concerts with the New York City Gay Men’s Chorus and the Boston Gay Men’s Chorus.

June 16, 2001: The 20th-anniversary gala concert was held at the Kennedy Center Concert Hall with special guest the San Francisco Gay Men's Chorus.

Dec. 8, 2002: GMCW participated in taping the 25th Annual Kennedy Center Honors — the first nationally televised performance by the Chorus — telecast on Dec. 26, 2002, on CBS. The chorus was invited to perform in tribute to one of the honorees, Elizabeth Taylor. The audience included the President, Vice President, Cabinet secretaries, congressmen and leaders in government, business and the entertainment industry.

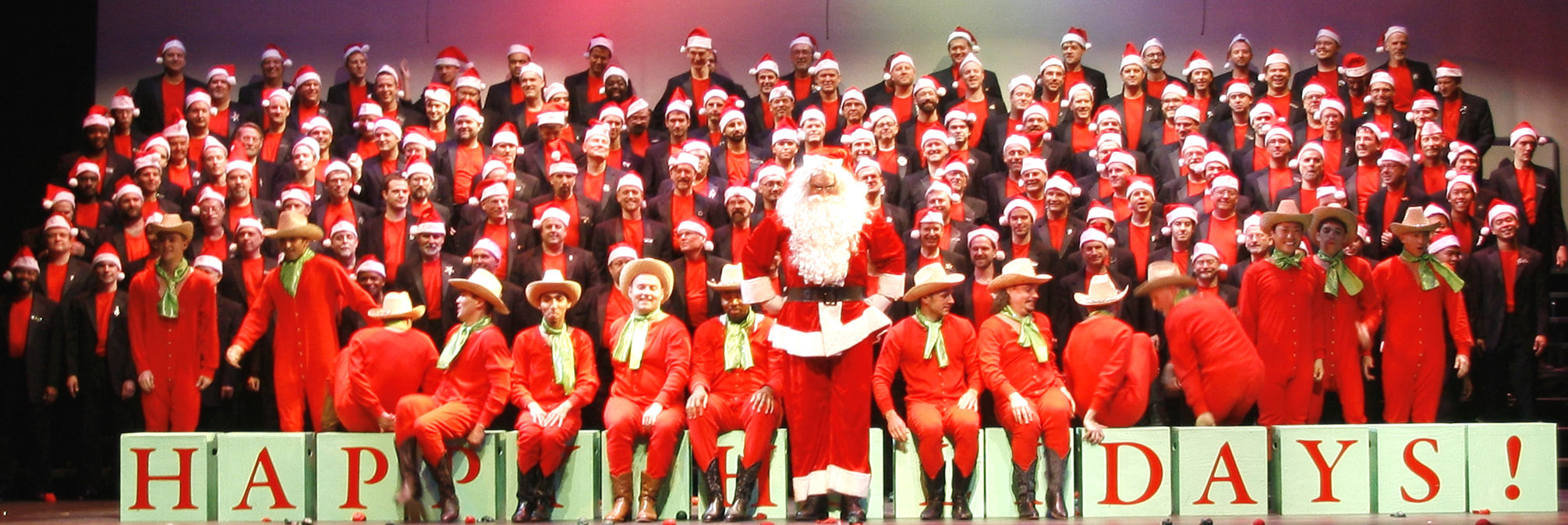
Gay Men's Chorus of Washington, D.C. performing a Christmas concert in 2008

June 4, 2005: The Pride Concert not only included a reprise of NakedMan — with special guests the Ft. Lauderdale Gay Men’s Chorus — but also presentation of the "Capital Pride Director’s Award for Outstanding Leadership and Commitment to the GLBT Community in Washington".

June 25, 2006: Culminating its 25th anniversary season, the chorus closed with "Singing Free!" with special guest Barbara Cook at the Kennedy Center. The single performance concert weekend included an alumni reception celebration the night before, and special chorus and guest party after the concert.

January 18, 2009: The chorus performed in We Are One: The Obama Inaugural Celebration at the Lincoln Memorial as back-up vocals for a duet of "My Country ’Tis of Thee" with Josh Groban and Heather Headley.

October 11, 2009: The chorus performed in the pre-concert rally for the National Equality March at the West Front of the United States Capitol Building.

March 19, 2010: GMCW staged an all-male version of the musical Grease.

Dec. 4, 2010: GMCW participated in taping the 33rd Annual Kennedy Center Honors, telecast on Dec. 28, 2010, on CBS. GMCW was invited to perform in tribute to one of the honorees, Jerry Herman. The audience included the President and First Lady, Vice President, Cabinet secretaries, congressmen and leaders in government, business and the entertainment industry. The chorus performed on stage with Kelsey Grammer, Angela Lansbury, Chita Rivera, Carol Channing, Christine Ebersole, Laura Benanti (who had performed in concert with the chorus at the Kennedy Center eight and a half years earlier), Sutton Foster, Kelli O'Hara and Matthew Morrison. This was the chorus’s second appearance on the honors telecast.

June 4, 2011: GMCW’s 30th-anniversary season included a reprise of its 2004 work A Pink Nutcracker, a concert salute to the 2010 congressionally enacted end of the "Don’t Ask, Don’t Tell" policy on gays and lesbians serving in the U.S. armed forces, and a full-scale production of the Carol Hall musical The Best Little Whorehouse in Texas. The season ended with a concert featuring a special guest, Tony Award winner Jennifer Holliday, and premiering Alexander’s House, a one-act work by composer Michael Shaieb telling the story of disparate parts of a gay man’s family — including his lover and friends and a young-adult son he had left behind — coming together as they cope with his death.

Oct. 24, 2011: The chorus hosted a party at the Hotel Helix in honor of the release of FCPAA Board of Directors member Paula Bresnan Gibson’s Voices From a Chorus. The book was the result of 14 months of research and work, during which time Paula interviewed 65 members and supporters of the chorus. Everyone who took the time to speak with Paula was featured and quoted in the book. For many months thereafter, Paula would go to book stores for live readings and discussions with customers. In July 2012, Paula and a panel of chorus members spoke during GALA Festival 2012 in Denver. To date, copies of the book are provided for free to all incoming members of the chorus.

June 2, 2012: The chorus’s 31st season had begun in December 2011 with a successful holiday extravaganza, Red & Greene, featuring special guest Ellen Greene. The Kids Are All Right, performed in February 2012, featured the Pittsburgh-based LGBT youth performing arts collective Dreams of Hope. In March, the Chorus performed an elaborately staged production of Richard O’Brien’s countercultural classic The Rocky Horror Show, which included audience call-outs from the film. GMCW’s small ensembles Rock Creek Singers and Potomac Fever united for the first time in many years for a single concert, Together Again, in April. The season concluded with the June 2012 performances of Heart Throbs, an energetic salute to the men of pop music. A month later, along with the small ensembles’ own appearances, the Chorus performed Alexander’s House as the first of a special series of morning "Coffee Concerts" at GALA Festival 2012 in Denver.

June 1, 2013: The Chorus’s 32nd season performances began in December 2012 with Winter Nights, which featured special guest the Virginia Bronze handbell ensemble. For the February 2013 concert, My Big Fat Gay Wedding, the Chorus hosted not just a special guest, gay folk singer and former member of Chanticleer Matt Alber, but also staged a wedding. A live-auction bid for the opportunity had been offered the year prior, during the 2012 Spring Affair fund-raiser. Dixon Charles and board member J.T. Hatfield Charles won the auction and were wed on stage by Chorus member and registered marriage officiant Patrick Nelson. In March, the Chorus performed a full-scale production of the 2007 Broadway musical Xanadu, based on the 1980 film starring Olivia Newton-John. In April, GMCW’s small ensembles Rock Creek Singers and Potomac Fever performed in the concert Side by Side. The season’s finalé included the June 2012 performances of Seven, a sexy, ebullient celebration of the seven deadly sins.

June 26, 2013: Chorus members assembled in front of the Supreme Court of the United States, at the direction of Associate Music Director Thea Kano, in reaction to the Court’s rulings eliminating key provisions of the federal Defense of Marriage Act and allowing a lower court’s ruling on California’s Proposition 8 to stand, thus allowing the law banning same-sex marriages in California to end. In front of press and hundreds of well-wishers, the Chorus performed "Make Them Hear You" (from the musical Ragtime) and "The Star-Spangled Banner". The performances were recorded on video, both by amateurs and professionals, and aired on local and national news broadcasts.

May 18, 2014: A bittersweet but significant moment occurred as the Chorus closed its 33rd season at the Kennedy Center Concert Hall with special guest Laura Benanti, who had joined the chorus 12 years earlier at the same venue. At that time, Jeffrey Buhrman was ending his second season as artistic director of the Chorus. On this day, in the performance of A Gay Man’s Guide to Broadway, he closed his 14th and final season, which had begun with a festive holiday show, Sparkle, Jingle, Joy, with guest Matt Alber, and continued with Passion, Von Trapped (a gay interpolation of The Sound of Music) and the small ensembles’ concert Forte, performed at the Mead Center for American Theater, home to Arena Stage. In A Gay Men’s Guide to Broadway, as many Chorus and audience members fought back tears, Burhman was honored by the Chorus and Benanti and given an extended standing ovation, and Washington, D.C., mayor Vincent Gray declared it "Jeffrey Burhman Day".
