= Gay Men's Chorus of Los Angeles =

American musical group

- Logo

Background information
- Also known as: GMCLA
- Origin: West Hollywood, California, United States
- Genres: Choral, jazz, popular
- Occupation: Men's Chorus
- Instrument: 200 voices
- Years active: 12 July 1979 – present
- Label: GMCLA
- Members: Executive Director & Producer; Lou Spisto; Music Director & Conductor; Dr. Ernest H. Harrison
- Website: www.gmcla.org

Gay Men's Chorus of Los Angeles (GMCLA) is a choral group composed of gay, lesbian, bisexual, transgender (LGBTQ+) persons from the Los Angeles area. Established in 1979, the GMCLA has grown in size, toured across the country and worldwide, and released at least 15 CDs.

== Appearances ==
GMCLA has appeared with numerous stage, film, and television celebrities including Billy Porter, Lily Tomlin, Angela Lansbury, Bea Arthur, Malcolm Gets, Doris Roberts, Jerry Herman, Melissa Manchester, Mary McDonnell, Levi Kreis, Joanna Gleason, Alex Newell, Amber Riley, Charles Pierce, Miss Coco Peru, Valarie Pettiford, Jane Lanier, Randi Driscoll, Margaret Cho, Michael Jeter, Stephen Schwartz, Liz Callaway, Lance Bass, Jennifer Holliday, Tierney Sutton, and LeAnn Rimes.

The chorus has appeared on several television broadcasts including the 85th Academy Awards, Access Hollywood, Will & Grace, $#*! My Dad Says, The Ren & Stimpy Show, Mad TV, a six-episode arc on Six Feet Under, and The Golden Bachelorette.

== Community involvement and history ==
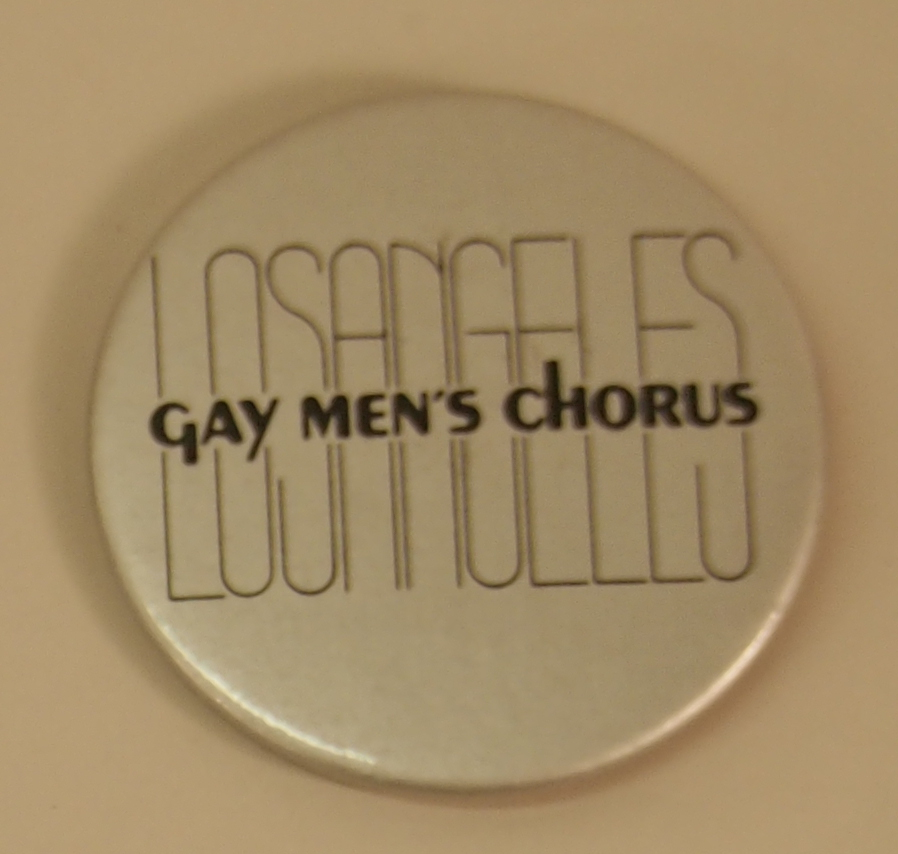
Pin

The GMCLA first formed on July 12, 1979, at Plummer Park Community Center, Los Angeles. After its establishment, the group started rehearsals for a performance in the National March on Washington for Lesbian and Gay Rights on October 14 of the same year, under the direction of Harold Kjellberg. Jerry Carlson became GMCLA's second Artistic Director in 1981 until he died in November 1987 of complications from HIV/AIDS. As one of the chorus' guest conductors after Jerry's passing, Dr. Jon Bailey became the next full-time Artistic Director in 1987 and remained thus for the next 14 years until he retired after the 2001 summer concert, "A Salute to Sondheim". He was eventually given the title, Director Emeritus. After Jon retired, the chorus hired Dr. Bruce Mayhall as the next artistic director. He served from the fall of 2001 until his departure in 2011. The next artistic director was E. Jason Armstrong, who only served for one year. From September 2012 to July 2013, GMCLA had guest conductors: Dr. Tim Seelig, Dr. Christian Grases and Andres Cladera.

The chorus continued to grow larger throughout the late 1970s and early 1980s. During the AIDS crisis, over twenty members by 1988. The GMCLA reports that 150 of its members died during the AIDS pandemic.

Previous executive directors of GMCLA included Peter Massey, Brian Wyatt and Christopher Verdugo, who was the director of the GMCLA from 2011 until September 9, 2016. Verdugo decided to step down as E.D. in search of new opportunities. Under his leadership the chorus grew to 250 members. Drawing inspiration from the It Gets Better Project, the choir launched a national tour partnered with Speak Theater Arts. The cast of each show consists of eight members of the GMCLA who tour around the country, often partnering up with local schools and community members.

Dr. Joe Nadeau was named artistic director in the fall of 2013 and has worked alongside Kevin Bolling (Director of Philanthropy), Gavin Thrasher (Assistant Conductor), Brianne Cohen (Events and Tour Manager), Taylor Hartley (Marketing Operations Manager), and James Geiger (Online Development - Photographer). In January 2017, Jonathan Weedman, the former senior vice president of the Wells Fargo Foundation was named the new executive director of GMCLA.

At the end of December 2018, Dr. Joe Nadeau resigned to return to Kansas City with his husband Eric and was succeeded by Gavin Thrasher as interim artistic director.

In 2019, performing arts executive Lou Spisto was appointed by fellow board members to serve as interim executive director before fully assuming the position in the same year, a position which he has held ever since. He brought Dr. Ernest H. Harrison in as music director and head of education and outreach in 2019.

GMCLA also started the Alive Music Project (AMP) in 2007, which focuses on middle and high schools in Los Angeles. The school's Gay-Straight Alliances form partnerships with GMCLA with the aim of improving the experience of LGBT youth in American schools and illustrating how singing together within the community can help with the formation of safe spaces. The students and the members of the GMCLA come together at an assembly to participate in musical performances and a question-and-answer period.

GMCLA is supported by several corporate and government partners, including Foresters Financial, which helped launch GMCLA's Voice Awards, which is now running for its 6th consecutive year. In 2016, the award show raised funds in support of GCMLA's outreach programs: the Alive Music Project and the It Gets Better Tour. Hosted by Ross Mathews and Pauley Perrette, the show was held on April 23 at the Dolby Ballroom Hollywood and had over 600 attendees.

== Notable performances ==
GMCLA became the first gay chorus to tour central Europe in 1991. That tour was featured in a documentary entitled "Out Loud" and was broadcast on the PBS television network.

GMCLA became the first gay men's chorus ever to perform for a sitting president of the United States (Bill Clinton) in 1997. In September 2011, GMCLA sang for President Barack Obama at a fundraiser in West Hollywood, California.

GMCLA became the first openly gay performers ever to be broadcast nationally over Russian television during their 1999 concert tour (which they performed to a sold-out Tchaikovsky Hall in Moscow).

In 2006, GMCLA became the first openly gay chorus to tour South America (Argentina, Brazil, Uruguay, and Chile). The tour's repertoire included North American and European classical and popular music from Bacharach to Verdi, as well as new works commissioned for the tour by Daniel Catán, Rosephanye Powell, and Daniel Alfonso. New music for the Tour was funded by the National Endowment for the Arts, the James Irvine Foundation, and the Los Angeles County Arts Commission. In each of the four countries, the chorus raised money for LGBTQ and HIV organizations, as well as helped to start the first gay chorus in South America, in Rio de Janeiro.

Each year the chorus presents three main stage concerts in such venues as the Saban Theatre in Beverly Hills, California, Walt Disney Concert Hall in downtown Los Angeles, California, and the historic Alex Theatre in Glendale, California; GMCLA performed over 100 times on the Alex stage since 1994, more than any other musical group in the theater's history.

GMCLA was featured in the song "Shia LaBeouf" by Rob Cantor.

In 2010 GMCLA recorded a music video of Cyndi Lauper's "True Colors" as part of the It Gets Better campaign in support of gay and lesbian teens. Singers LeAnn Rimes and Sheryl Lee Ralph joined the Chorus in December 2010 for their "Comfort and Joy" concert, which also addressed bullying and teen suicide.

In 2013 GMCLA performed in the 85th Academy Awards, now the Oscars, in the opening musical sequence "We Saw Your Boobs" with host Seth MacFarlane. The following year they were featured at the Hollywood Bowl in "The Simpsons Take The Bowl" with Conan O'Brien, Beverly D'Angelo, and the cast and creators of The Simpsons, celebrating the show's 25th Anniversary.

A 2018 matinée performance of "The Pink Carpet: The Portrayal of LGBTQ People in Film" at the Alex Theatre was the target of a bomb threat.

== See also ==
- LGBTQ culture in Los Angeles County
