= Judith Palmer =

American composer, singer and arranger

- Born: Ohio, United States
- Genres: Folk, 4-part harmony (Barbershop), Political humor
- Occupations: Registered piano technician, singer, composer, arranger
- Website: Quality Piano Service

Judith Palmer is a Philadelphia-area composer, singer, and arranger. She is one of the founding members of Anna Crusis Women's Choir, America's oldest and longest running feminist choir.

== Early life ==
Judith Palmer grew up in rural Ohio. Her mother used to say she "came out of the womb singing." The local, public school system, exposed her to musical instrument lessons, and singing opportunities. Her first composition, in 1963, was “The Class Song.” It was conducted by Judith and sung at high school graduation by all 32 members of her graduating class.

== Wine, Women and Song ==
In 1970, Judith helped start the feminist singing group Wine, Women and Song. The motivation for starting the group was to make up for the dearth of women-composed, women-centered music, and to create music for a day-long radio program of original feminist music for International Women's Day. Judith's first arrangement for this program was "Free of the Burden", to the tune of "Get Along Home Cindy, Cindy". In 1975, Cathy Roma recruited singers from Wine, Women and Song to form Anna Crusis Women's Choir.

== Anna Crusis Women's Choir ==
Judith is a founding member of Anna Crusis Women's Choir. Since 1975, she has sung in the first soprano section and has served as choir arranger and composer, particularly of four- and five- part acappella pieces written for small ensembles. ANNA’s mission to foster social change and advance the empowerment of women provided a venue for the musical expression of Judith's social commentary. Access to fine singers and the choir’s commitment to LGBTQ+ issues has also provided a place for reflections on her own personal journey.

== Compositions and arrangements ==
- Mariju-ANNA, original composition, first performed 2 June 2019
- Light of a Clear Blue Morning, re-wording of Craig Hella Johnson's a capella arrangement of Dolly Parton's Light of a Clear Blue Morning, performed December 8, 2018
- Rise Up Again, first performed 3 June 2017
- America, The More Beautiful, re-arrangement of Katharine Lee Bates' America, The Beautiful, first performed 10 December 2016
- Common Ground, 2015
- The Recital, 2015
- What's in a Name?, 2014
- Golden Arches, 2013
- Peace Canon, 2012
- Plutocracy Trumps, 2011
- Breaking for Trout, 2010
- Toast the Earth with Exxon Mobil, re-arrangement of song by the Austin Lounge Lizards, 2010
- A Mighty Shrug, 2009
- Still Fallin' , music commissioned by Sharon Dailey, 2009
- Tumble Me, 2008
- Outside the Bottle, 2007
- On the Wind, first performed June 2007
- Our Remains: The Composting Song, arrangement; words and music by Jamie Foto, 2007
- Cheney at the Pump, text by Calvin Trillin, 2006
- Bushwacked, 2005
- Oldest Feminist Choir on Mission: A quodlibet based on the mission statement of the Anna Crusis Women's Choir, skits by Jennifer Raison, first performed 14 May 2005
- I Believe, barbershop arrangement of "I Believe", 2003
- Mrs. Harold Righteousbomber, arrangement; words and music by Darthe Jennings, 2000; performed by MUSE (Cincinnati Women's Choir)
- Woe to Pinochet, 1999
- 37 Bumperstickers, 1998
- Your Satin PJs: An Adult Lullaby, 1996
- Houseboat Holiday, 1995
- Mrs. Harold Righteousbomber, arrangement; words and music by Darthe Jennings, 1995; performed by Portland Lesbian Choir, Sacramento Women’s Chorus, HerSong (Iowa women's chorus), Juneau Pride Chorus, Alaska Women’s Chorus, New Mexico Women’s Chorus, Womonsong (Madison, WI feminist choir, 1978-1997), Indianapolis Women’s Chorus, and MUSE (Cincinnati Women's Choir)
- Menopause, 1994; appears on 2000 album Spaces Between the Stars, has also been performed by Windsong (Cleveland's feminist chorus), The LimeJello, Marshmallow Surprise, and SheWho (Philadelphia feminist vocal ensemble)
- The Celebration Song, 1994
- Together Proud and Strong, arrangement; words and music by Lynn Thomas, 1993
- Plain song for Kenny, arrangement; words and music by Gwendolyn Burke, 1992; performed by Portland Gay Men's Chorus, 1996, 2012
- Kitchen Ditty, words by Susan Saxe, 1983
- Finny, 1982
- Farmer Brown, arrangement; words and music by Dean Morgan, 1981
- Little Fetuses, arrangement; words by Mybel Johnson, music by Malvina Reynolds
- Finny, 1981
- Whether to Mother, 1980
- Women Friends, 1978
- New Life, words by Linda Bettof, 1977
- Who's Gonna' Shoe, arrangement traditional, 1976
- Still Ain't Satisfied, arrangement; words and music by Bonnie Lockhart of the Red Star Singers, 1974
- Women Friends, 1973
- Free of the Burden, arrangement; words co-authored by Marykae Josh, 1971
- You Can't Stop NOW (when NOW was being attacked by anti-feminists, early 70's)
- Don't Bring Me Posies
- Class Song, 1963
