= MUSE Cincinnati Women's Choir =

Women's choir in Cincinnati, Ohio

- Origin: Cincinnati, Ohio, United States
- Genres: Women's music, folk music, gospel music
- Occupation: Choir
- Years active: 1984–present

MUSE Cincinnati Women's Choir is a women's choir based in Cincinnati, Ohio, United States. The choir was founded in 1984 by Catherine Roma.

MUSE began in 1984 with a focus on women's music and folk music. Roma founded and directed the choir until her retirement as artistic director in 2013. In 2007 MUSE had 60 members and was known for having an activist approach to music. The choir's programs have included gospel, peace chants, commissioned works and music connected to social justice and equality. The choir has also commissioned works, including Let Us Now Hold Hands, a 1995 piece by Jennifer Stasack with text by Pat Mora. At the 2012 World Choir Games in Cincinnati, MUSE received a gold rating in the Female Choirs category of the Champions Competition.
