= The Marsh Ladies Choir =

Women's choir group in England

Marsh Ladies Choir, Tallinn 2007

The Marsh Ladies Choir is an amateur women's choir based in the town of Huddersfield, in the English county of West Yorkshire. It was founded in 1955. It currently has around 40 members and has developed a wide repertoire from their classical, folk, swing, and jazz shows. The choir maintains a busy schedule of concerts and competitions, both in Huddersfield and further afield. The Choir became a registered charity in 2007
