= NEZZA =

American singer (born 1995)

Nezza
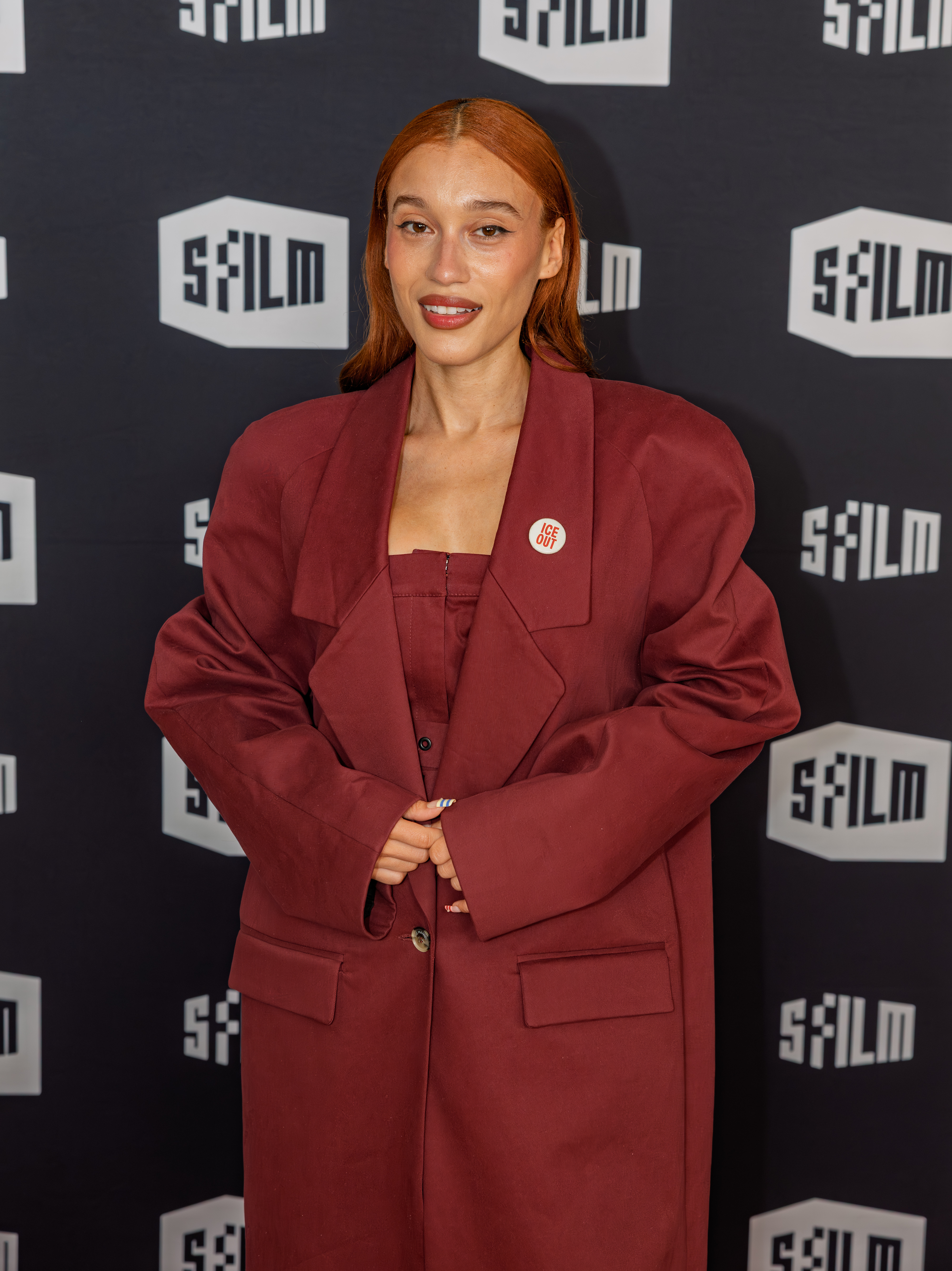
- Nezza in 2026

Background information
- Born: 1995 (age 30–31)
- Origin: Bay Area, California, US
- Genres: Latin R&B; Spanglish pop
- Occupation: Singer
- Years active: 2018–present
- Label: Virgin Music Group

Vanessa Hernández, better known by her stage name Nezza (born 1995) is an American singer and dancer of Colombian and Dominican heritage best known for singing in Latin R&B and Spanglish pop styles. She became best known for a viral performance of The Star-Spangled Banner in Spanish at a Dodgers game in June 2025, but has created her own songs on social media since 2018.

== Biography ==
Hernández has Dominican and Colombian heritage. From a young age, she was interested in music, and has recounted how the house was "never quiet" due to her parents' love of salsa dance. She began posting song covers on YouTube during high school, then moved to Los Angeles, where she worked as a back-up dancer.

She began singing her own songs in 2018, retooling her Youtube. Most of the songs she created from then on were written by her, including "Temporary", "Corazon Frio", "Sola", "Tenerte de Nuovo", "Thirteen", "Poison", and "Heaven", and her EP Club Solita: the first song she performed that she hadn't written was "Classy" (2025). Her songs are known for being in Spanglish. She signed with Virgin Music Group in 2021.

She rose to media attention after being hired to perform the national anthem at a Dodgers game in 2025, during the 2025 ICE protests. In an effort to stand with immigrants, instead of performing the English-language Star-Spangled Banner, she decided to perform the official Spanish-language version El Pendon Estrellado, written by Clotilde Arias and commissioned by the government. She was told by the Dodgers that she had 90 seconds, but even after informing them, she says, they didn't object. On the performance date, however, they did object. She still performed the Spanish version. She then stated that the Dodgers called her and banned her from any future performances, though the Dodgers claimed they would be happy to have her back.

After the performance, she continued to release music, including a recording of El Pendon Estrellado, the first ever studio-released version of the song, of which she has pledged to donate 100% of proceeds.

Her performance and the leadup to it was turned into a documentary, La Tierra del Valor, that premiered at the 2026 Sundance Film Festival.

== Discography ==
EPs:

- Club Solita (Virgin Music, 2021)

Singles:

- "Gigi" (coming June 2026)
- "Sweat" (2026)
- "Tasty" (2025)
- "El Pendon Estrellado" (2025)
- "Classy" (2025)
- "La La La" (2024)
- "Heaven" (2024)
- "Poison" (2022)
- "Thirteen" (2022)
- "Tenerte de Nuovo" with LATENIGHTJIGGY (2021)
- "Sola" (2021)
- "Corazon Frio" (2020)
- "Good Love" (2019)
- "Cuentos" (2019)
- "Nothing Now" (2019)
- "Strangers" (2019)
- "On and On" (2018)
- "Temporary" (2018)
