= Clotilde Arias =

Peruvian-American lyricist and composer

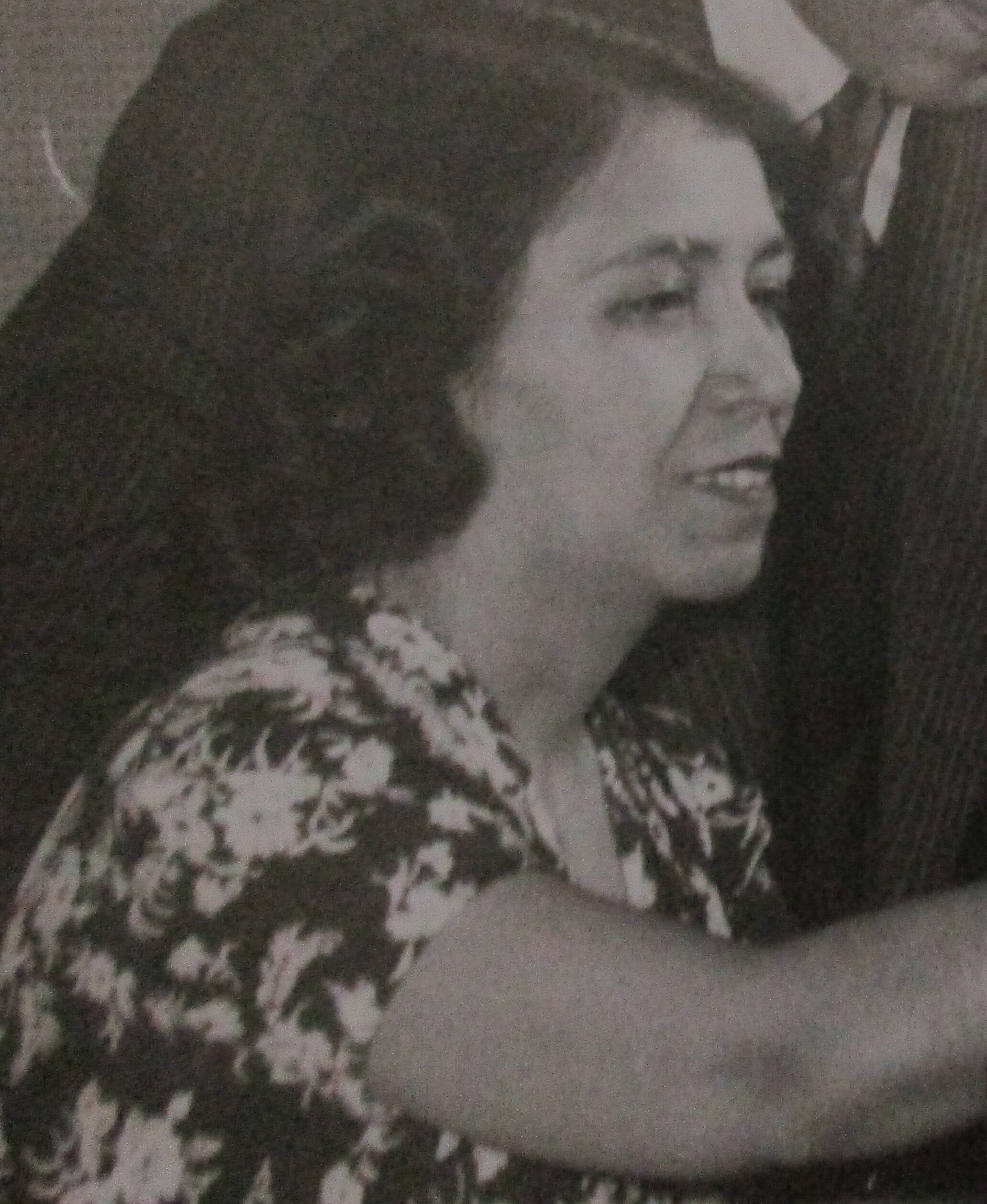
- Born: Clotilde Arias Chávarri; 20 June 1901; Iquitos, Peru
- Died: 6 May 1959 (aged 57); Burlington, Vermont, US
- Occupations: Composer, performer
- Known for: Composition of song "Huiracocha" and official translation of U.S. anthem to Spanish
- Spouse: José Anduaga (m. 1929)
- Children: 1

Clotilde Arias Chávarri Anduaga de Ferrero (20 June 1901 – 6 May 1959) was a Peruvian-American composer and lyricist.

She is best known for her composition of the song "Huiracocha", popular in Peru and sung worldwide; and for her translation of "The Star-Spangled Banner", the United States national anthem, into lyrical Spanish, commissioned by the U.S. Department of State in 1946. Arias was also an integral part of the Pan-American movement during the 1940s, as well as an advocate for Spanish-language education in the United States.

== Life ==
Arias was born in 1901 in Iquitos, Peru, on the shores of the Amazon. She spent many of her early years in Barbados, where she attended elementary school.

She began writing and composing songs during her teenage years. Arias's artistic talents in music, painting, and composing – including playing for silent movies – emerged early in Iquitos. She achieved scholastic and artistic recognition, with numerous honors. Her perfect pitch and exceptional ability to sight read made her a highly sought accompanist. Throughout Peruvian history, the Charango was a common instrument of their culture. While Arias focused on composing, she also mastered this instrument as a young child.

She moved to New York City in 1923 to study music. She married José Anduaga, another Peruvian artist, in 1929. They settled in Brooklyn and had a son, Roger. By the early 1940s, Arias had divorced Anduaga and moved to Manhattan with her son. In 1942, she became a naturalized U.S. citizen.

== Professional career ==
Arias spent considerable time developing a wide variety of skills. During her lifetime, she worked as a composer, musician, copywriter, educator, translator, journalist, and activist, all while being a single parent. Amongst her many jobs, Arias translated English-language radio shows into Spanish to help reach a wider audience.

Throughout the 1930s and 1940s, Arias gained success as a composer in the male-dominated advertising industry. During World War II, U.S. companies were intent on expanding their markets into Latin America. Arias was perfectly placed and skilled to assist in this endeavor. She frequently worked for advertising companies and composed jingles for Alka-Seltzer, the Ford Motor Company and the Campbell's. She eventually even became head of the Spanish-language division of the Robert Otto agency.

Arias composed other serious classical songs, including "Idilio Roto (Broken Idyll)," as well as songs in the popular style of the 1930s, some of which she sold door to door to help support her family. Later, she collaborated with notable composers and writers, including Marjorie Harper, Andy Razaf, Albert Gamse and Irving Caesar. Best known were her Spanish lyrics to song hits "Rum and Coca-Cola" (English lyrics by Morey Amsterdam) and "Managua Nicaragua" (English lyrics by Albert Gamse), and "Take Me Out to the Ball Game."

=== "El Pendón Estrellado" ===
In 1945, after the Division and Cultural Cooperation of the Department of State, along with the Music Educators National Conference, called for translations of the United States' national anthem,"The Star-Spangled Banner," to be translated into Spanish and Portuguese so that it could be read in the countries that speak those languages. It had already been translated into Spanish twice, but a truly artful singable translation had yet to be realized. Arias took on that task, and translated it as closely as she could into Spanish. Arias' version remains to this day the only official translation of the national anthem allowed to be sung at major events. This translation also had significant political impact at the time, as President Franklin Roosevelt worked to gain allies for the U.S. war effort. Arias' translation was part of a concerted endeavor to create positive relations with Latin American countries through the spread of American patriotic music and culture as part of the Good Neighbor Policy.

This song had its first studio recording in 2025 by NEZZA.

=== "Huiracocha" ===
Amongst her numerous compositions, Huiracocha may be the best known. Named for a god of the Incas, the song retells the legend of his emergence from the depths of Lake Titicaca to create the sun, moon, and stars, and to breathe life into Allcavica, ancestor of the Inca people. According to Arias's own program note, this song is "dedicated to the Indian, the Forgotten Man of the Americas." It tells of the "sadness of a race calling to the ancient god of their forefathers, who no longer hears his children."

Huiracocha! Huiracocha!
Dios del Inca y Dios mio
De padres bonanza,
De mi hijos la esperanza

Ya tus tierras no florecen
y tus templos emmudecen
Yen mi alma y un vacio,
Huiracocha, padre mío.

Translation:

Huiracocha! Huiracocha!
God of the Inca and my God
Beauty for fathers,
Hope for my children

Your lands no longer flourish
and your temples fall silent
And a void in my soul,
Huiracocha, my father.

== Tributes ==
On December 9, 2006, "Huiracocha" was performed at London's Barbican Hall by tenor Juan Diego Flórez. A separate 2009 performance of Huiracocha on YouTube is also available for viewing.

In 2013, "Huiracocha" was recorded by Ward De Vleeschhouwer on the album Chicha Morada in a version for piano solo.

Her lyrical Spanish translation of "The Star-Spangled Banner" is on display in The Star-Spangled Banner exhibit at the National Museum of American History of the Smithsonian Institution in Washington, D.C.

An exhibit with a display of her cultural achievements in the arts and writings opened at the Albert H. Small Documents Gallery September 27, 2012, and was on display until April 2013.

On October 30, 2020, the National Museum of American History in Washington, D.C. posted a tribute to Arias on their Instagram account @amhistorymuseum.^{7}

== List of works ==
List of Works submitted to the American Society of Composers, Authors and Publishers (ASCAP)
Title	Composer(s)	Publisher	Author
The Star Spangled Banner	John Stafford Smith	N/A	Clotilde Arias (Official Spanish Translation)
The Moon Is Yellow (El Amor Llamo)	Ahlert-Lesli	Bregman, Vocco & Conn Inc	Clotilde Arias (Spanish lyrics)
Que Capricho Loco	Jaime Yamin	Caribbean Music Company	Clotilde Arias (Spanish lyrics)
Yo Nunca Quise Amar	Jaime Yamin	Caribbean Music Company	Clotilde Arias (Spanish lyrics)
Venca Minina	Clotilde Arias	Caribbean Music Company	Clotilde Arias (Spanish/English lyrics)
Mariana Mia	Eaton-Lambert-Gamse	Caribbean Music Company	Clotilde Arias (Spanish lyrics)
Love Is Such a Cheat (Tal es el Amor)	Cuperescu-Caesar	Irving Caesar	Clotilde Arias (Spanish lyrics)
Song of Friendship (19 songs)	Irving Caesar	Irving Caesar	Clotilde Arias (Spanish lyrics)
Song of Safety (20 songs)	Mark-Caesar	Irving Caesar	Clotilde Arias (Spanish lyrics)
Rum and Coca-Cola	Sullivan-Baron-Ambsterdam	Leo Feist Inc	Clotilde Arias (Spanish lyrics)
Whispering Pine (Oh Verde Pinar)	Trenet-Lawrence	Leeds Music Company	Clotilde Arias (Spanish lyrics)
There's a Smile in Your Eyes (Ya Sonrie El Amor)	Montes-Siegman	Leeds Music Company	Clotilde Arias (Spanish lyrics)
The Gypsy (La Gitana)	Billy Reid	Leeds Music Company	Clotilde Arias (Spanish lyrics)
On the Way to Venezuela (La Cancion de Venezuela)	Madriquera-Gamse	Magnet Music Inc	Clotilde Arias (Spanish lyrics)
Forgotten Serenade (La Serenata Olvidada)	Sugarman-Gamse	Magnet Music Inc	Clotilde Arias (Spanish lyrics)
The Girl Behind the Song (El Amor Oculto en mi Cancion)	Madiera-Gamse	Magnet Music Inc	Clotilde Arias (Spanish lyrics)
Chi-Chi-Chi-Rom-Bom	Olivares-Gamse	Magnet Music Inc	Clotilde Arias (Spanish lyrics)
Caramba, It's the Samba (Caramba es La Samba)	Vasquez-Gamse	Magnet Music Inc	Clotilde Arias (Spanish lyrics)
Take It Away (Tomalo Tu)	Madriquera - Gamse	Magnet Music Inc	Clotilde Arias (Spanish lyrics)
You Are Everything to Me	Sanchez - David	Paramount	Clotilde Arias (Spanish lyrics)
Muchachita	Frydan - Gamse	Empress Music Publisher	Clotilde Arias (Spanish lyrics)
Aos Pes Da Cruz (Al Pie de Aquella Cruz)	Pinto - Goncalves	Robbins Music Corporation	Clotilde Arias (Spanish lyrics)
Banzo	Tavares - Araujo	Robbins Music Corporation	Clotilde Arias (Spanish lyrics)
Bates Palmas	Pretinho - Guedes	Robbins Music Corporation	Clotilde Arias (Spanish lyrics)
Bonita Eres Tu	Moreales - Re	Robbins Music Corporation	Clotilde Arias (Spanish lyrics)
Coco de Bahia	A. Almeida	Robbins Music Corporation	Clotilde Arias (Spanish lyrics)
Canta Brazil	Nasser - Vermelho	Robbins Music Corporation	Clotilde Arias (Spanish lyrics)
Coco de Minha Terra (Coco de Mi Tierra)	Taveres - D'Altavilla	Robbins Music Corporation	Clotilde Arias (Spanish lyrics)
Mi Ranchero	Clotilde Arias	Robbins Music Corporation	Clotilde Arias (Spanish lyrics)
Negra de Cabello Duro	Nasser - Soares	Robbins Music Corporation	Clotilde Arias (Spanish lyrics)
Oh Rancho Fundo	Barroso - Babo	Robbins Music Corporation	Clotilde Arias (Spanish lyrics)
Plaza Once	Othelo - Martins	Robbins Music Corporation	Clotilde Arias (Spanish lyrics)
Samba de Copacabana	Nasser - Frazao	Robbins Music Corporation	Clotilde Arias (Spanish lyrics)
Shu-Shu	Almeida - de Souza	Robbins Music Corporation	Clotilde Arias (Spanish lyrics)
Teleco-Teco	Caldas - Pinto	Robbins Music Corporation	Clotilde Arias (Spanish lyrics)
Valle del Rio Dulce	Nasser - Pinto	Robbins Music Corporation	Clotilde Arias (Spanish lyrics)
Vatapa	Dorival Caymmi	Robbins Music Corporation	Clotilde Arias (Spanish lyrics)
Song of the River	Savino - Harper	Robbins Music Corporation	Clotilde Arias (Spanish lyrics)
Soy Bahiana	Dorival Caymmi	Robbins Music Corporation	Clotilde Arias (Spanish lyrics)
Ela Voi A Feira (Me Seinto Bien)	Roberti - Greco	Robbins Music Corporation	Clotilde Arias (Spanish lyrics)
Lig-Lig-Lig-Le	Santiago - Barosa	Robbins Music Corporation	Clotilde Arias (Spanish lyrics)
La Raspa	Mexican folk song	Robbins Music Corporation	Clotilde Arias (Spanish lyrics)
Cavaquinho	Nazareth - Almeida	Robbins Music Corporation	Clotilde Arias (Spanish lyrics)
Santa Rosa	McCarthy Jr - Rae	Robbins Music Corporation	Clotilde Arias (Spanish lyrics)
Escucha Tu	Clotilde Arias	E.B. Marks Music Corporation	Clotilde Arias (Spanish lyrics)
Huiracocha	Clotilde Arias	E.B. Marks Music Corporation	Clotilde Arias (Spanish lyrics)
Carnival	Warren - Russell	Triangle Music Corp	Clotilde Arias (Spanish lyrics)
Our Lady of Guadalupe (Senora de Guadalupe)	Marjorie Harper	Whalen Music—Chicago	Clotilde Arias (Spanish lyrics)
Santa Rosa de Lima	Marjorie Harper	Whalen Music—Chicago	Clotilde Arias (Spanish lyrics)
Red Lips Yellow Moonlight (Labios Como Amapola)	Clotilde Arias	Leeds Music Corp	Clotilde Arias (Spanish lyrics)
Down the Old Mission Road (Un Recuerdo de Amor)	Marjorie Harper	Top Notch Music Inc.	Clotilde Arias (Spanish lyrics)
My Foolish Heart (Mi Enamorado Corazon)	Young-Washington	DECCA	Clotilde Arias (Spanish lyrics)
Idilio Roto	Clotilde Arias	R.C.A. Victor	Clotilde Arias (Spanish lyrics)
Suenos de Ayer	Sonia Dmitrowna	R.C.A. Victor	Clotilde Arias (Spanish lyrics)
Amor	Sonia Dmitrowna	R.C.A. Victor	Clotilde Arias (Spanish lyrics)
Gato Libre	Clotilde ARias	R.C.A. Victor	Clotilde Arias (Spanish lyrics)
Sonaba Qui Me Ausentaba	Clotilde ARias	R.C.A. Victor	Clotilde Arias (Spanish lyrics)
Margarita	Sonia Dmitrowna	R.C.A.Victor	Clotilde Arias (Spanish lyrics)
Ati-Ra-Ra	Clotilde Arias	Casi Mardi Inc (Santurce P.R.)	Clotilde Arias (Spanish lyrics, on record)
Ford Car 1951	Clotilde Arias	Clotilde Arias	Clotilde Arias (Spanish lyrics, jingle)
Ford Car 1952	Clotilde Arias	Clotilde Arias	Clotilde Arias (Spanish lyrics, jingle)
Royal Coconut Pudding	Clotilde Arias	Clotilde Arias	Clotilde Arias (Spanish lyrics, jingle)
Pond's Lips	Clotilde Arias	Clotilde Arias	Clotilde Arias (Spanish lyrics, jingle)
Parkay Margarine No. 1	Clotilde Arias	Clotilde Arias	Clotilde Arias (lyrics, jingle)
Parkay Margarine No. 2	Clotilde Arias	Clotilde Arias	Clotilde Arias (lyrics, jingle)
Royal Flan	Clotilde Arias	Clotilde Arias	Clotilde Arias (lyrics, jingle)
Arrid Deodorant	Clotilde Arias	Clotilde Arias	Clotilde Arias (lyrics, jingle)
Odorono	Clotilde Arias	Clotilde Arias	Clotilde Arias (lyrics, jingle)
Tangee Lipstick 1953-54	Clotilde Arias		Clotilde Arias (lyrics, jingle)
Tangee Lipstick 1955	Clotilde Arias		Clotilde Arias (lyrics, jingle)
Bab-O	Clotilde Arias		Clotilde Arias (lyrics, jingle)
Underwood Deviled Ham 1953-54	Clotilde Arias		Clotilde Arias (lyrics, jingle)
Underwood Deviled Ham 1955	Clotilde Arias		Clotilde Arias (lyrics, jingle)
Blue Bonnet Margarine	Clotilde Arias		Clotilde Arias (lyrics, jingle)
Cambell Soups 1953-54	Clotilde Arias		Clotilde Arias (lyrics, jingle)
Cambell Soups 1955	Clotilde Arias		Clotilde Arias (jingle on radio and TV)
Cutex Lipstic	Clotilde Arias		Clotilde Arias (Spanish lyrics, TV jingle)
Cutex Nail-Polish	Clotilde Arias		Clotilde Arias (Spanish lyrics, TV jingle)
Schaefer Beer 1952-1955	Clotilde Arias		Clotilde Arias (Spanish lyrics, TV jingle)
Vienna Sausages	Clotilde Arias		Clotilde Arias (Spanish lyrics, TV jingle)
Alka Seltzer 1953	Clotilde Arias		Clotilde Arias (Spanish lyrics, TV/radio jingle)
Alka Seltzer 1954	Clotilde Arias		Clotilde Arias lyrics (jingle on radio and TV)
Alka Seltzer 1954	Clotilde Arias		Clotilde Arias lyrics (jingle on radio and TV)
Remington Rand Electric Shaver	Clotilde Arias		Clotide Arias lyrics (jingle in England)

== See also ==
- List of 20th-century American women composers
