= Nuestro Himno =

2006 music single

Single by Andy Andy, Autoridad de la Sierra, Aventura, Ivy Queen, Wyclef Jean, Kalimba, Kany, LDA, N Klabe, Patrulla 81, Pitbull, Ponce Carlos, Rayito, Reik, Frank Reyes, Tony Sunshine, Olga Tañon, Gloria Trevi, Voz a Voz and Yemaya

from the album Somos Americanos
- Released: 28 April 2006
- Recorded: 2006; New York City, Miami, Los Angeles, Puerto Rico, Mexico City, Madrid
- Genre: Latin pop
- Length: 3:20
- Label: Urban Box Office
- Songwriters: Adam Kidron, Eduardo Reyes
- Producer: Eduardo Reyes

"Nuestro Himno" (Spanish for "Our Anthem") is a Spanish-language version of the United States national anthem, "The Star-Spangled Banner". The debut of the translation came amid a growing controversy over immigration in the United States (see 2006 U.S. immigration reform protests).

== Background ==
The idea for the song came from British music executive Adam Kidron, as a show of support to Hispanic immigrants in the United States. The song is included on the album Somos Americanos; a portion of the profits of which go to the National Capital Immigration Coalition, a Washington, D.C.–based group. Many other artist including Tito El Bambino and Frank Reyes are also originally to be feature on the song, originating from an album which is a "collection of the latino experience in America" according to Barry Jeckell of Billboard.

Reporter Stephen Dinan wrote: "The song 'Nuestro Himno,' which means 'Our Anthem,' is not a faithful and literal Spanish translation of the words to 'The Star-Spangled Banner,' but is a hip-hop-style remix with new raps and chants."

The song's first verse is apparently based on a 1919 translation prepared by Francis Haffkine Snow for the United States Bureau of Education. The only changes to the first verse from this version are a replacement of "no veis" ("don't you see?") with "lo veis" ("do you see it?"); "barras" ("bars") with "franjas" ("stripes"); and "Fulgor de cohetes, de bombas estruendo" ("the brilliance of rockets, the roar of bombs") with "Fulgor de la lucha, al paso de la libertad" ("the brilliance of struggle, in step with freedom"). However, subsequent verses diverge significantly between the 1919 and 2006 versions.

The song features Latin American artists such as Haitian native Wyclef Jean, Cuban-American hip hop star Pitbull and Puerto Rican singers Carlos Ponce and Olga Tañón. It debuted at 7:00 p.m. ET on 28 April 2006 on more than 500 Spanish language radio stations.

A remix was planned to be released in June. It will contain several lines in English that condemn U.S. immigration laws. Among them: "These kids have no parents, cause all of these mean laws... let's not start a war with all these hard workers, they can't help where they were born."

The national anthem was previously translated into German in 1861. It has also been translated into Yiddish by Jewish immigrants and into French by Cajuns.

== Controversy ==
Although the song's creators did not claim that it was a verbatim translation, Nuestro Himno has nonetheless provoked controversy for favoring style over precision and de-emphasizing the original anthem's bellicose aspects. It has also received criticism for its political use by supporters of immigrants and more liberalized immigration policies. Others criticize the rendition, believing that any variation from the official version demeans a near-sacred symbol to some Americans. According to Victor Martinez of LaLey and Radio Mex in Atlanta, Georgia, "The flag, and the country's national anthem are sacred. You shouldn't touch them. You shouldn't change them."

Another critic of the new version is Charles Key, great-great-grandson of Francis Scott Key, whose poem "Defense of Fort McHenry" was set to music as "The Star-Spangled Banner." Key has commented that he "think[s] it's a despicable thing that someone is going into our society from another country and ... changing our national anthem."

During a press conference on 28 April 2006, President George W. Bush commented, "I think people who want to be a citizen of this country ought to learn English. And they ought to learn to sing the anthem in English." However, author Kevin Phillips has noted that "[w]hen visiting cities like Chicago, Milwaukee, or Philadelphia, in pivotal states, he would drop in at Hispanic festivals and parties, sometimes joining in singing "The Star-Spangled Banner" in Spanish, sometimes partying with a "Viva Bush" mariachi band flown in from Texas.

In addition, the Department of State offers several Spanish translations of the anthem on its website.

On 4 May 2006, comedian Jon Stewart called the controversy over the translation "unbelievably stupid," and jokingly suggested that the first verse (the only verse commonly sung) be kept in English, and that the other verses be given to "whoever wants [them]," because those are the verses "Americans don't want or won't sing," alluding to the stereotype that undocumented immigrants take the jobs that other Americans don't want.

On the second season of Mind of Mencia, comedian Carlos Mencia decodes the first verse of the song.

In September 2012 the Smithsonian Institution's National Museum of American History highlighted another Spanish translation of the national anthem, commissioned in 1945 by the U.S. State Department for use in Latin America. Two prior Spanish translations of the anthem were considered difficult to sing to the music of the English version. The State Department's Division of Cultural Cooperation approved "El Pendón Estrellado," the translation submitted by the Peruvian composer Clotilde Arias. Arias' translation was considered more faithful to the original English verses than prior Spanish translations.

=== Spanish ===
Amanece, ¿lo veis, a la luz de la aurora,
lo que tanto aclamamos la noche al caer?
Sus estrellas, sus franjas flotaban ayer,
En el fiero combate en señal de victoria.
Fulgor de lucha, al paso de la libertad,
Por la noche decían: «¡Se va defendiendo!»

¡Oh, decid! ¿Despliega aún su hermosura estrellada
Sobre tierra de libres la bandera sagrada?

=== English translation ===
Day is breaking: Do you see by the light of the dawn
What so proudly we hailed at last night's fall?
Its stars, its stripes, streamed yesterday,
Above fierce combat as a symbol of victory.
The splendor of battle, on the march toward liberty.
Throughout the night, they proclaimed: "We march on to defend it!"

O say! Does its starry beauty still wave
Above the land of the free, the sacred flag?

== See also ==
- Immigration reform
- Jimi Hendrix's Star Spangled Banner
- List of United States immigration legislation
- United States immigration debate
- Official Spanish (singable) translation of the Star Spangled Banner
