= List of 20th-century American women composers =

This is a list of 20th-century American women composers ordered alphabetically by surname.

== A ==
- Mildred Adair (1895–1943)
- Esther Allan (1914–1985)
- Beth Anderson (born 1950)
- Elinor Armer (born 1939)
- Clarice Assad (born 1978)
- Lera Auerbach (born 1973)
- May Aufderheide (1888–1972)

== B ==
- Elaine Barkin (born 1932)
- Floy Little Bartlett (1883–1955)
- Amy Beach (1867–1944)
- Eve Beglarian (born 1958)
- Jeanne Behrend (1911–1988)
- Lauren Bernofsky (born 1967)
- Carla Bley (born 1938)
- Margaret Bonds (1913–1972)
- Radie Britain (1899–1994)
- Rosemary Brown (1916–2001)
- Canary Lee Burton (born 1942)

== C ==
- Wendy Carlos (born 1939)
- Gloria Coates (1938–2023)
- Nellie Weldon Cocroft (1885–1986)
- Valerie Coleman
- Sylvia Constantinidis (born 1962)

== D ==
- Katherine Kennicott Davis (1892–1980)
- Emma Lou Diemer (1927–2024)

== E ==
- Marti Epstein (born 1959)
- Reena Esmail (born 1983)

== F ==
- Sylvia Fine (1913–1991)
- Vivian Fine (1913–2000)

== G ==
- Miriam Gideon (1906–1996)
- Annie Gosfield (born 1960)

== H ==
- Juliana Hall (born 1958)
- Barbara Harbach (born 1946)
- Melissa Hui (born 1966)
- Jennifer Higdon (born 1962)

== K ==
- Laura Karpman (born 1959)
- Barbara Kolb (born 1939)

== L ==
- Joan La Barbara (born 1947)
- Anne La Berge (born 1955)
- Vanessa Lann (born 1968)
- Libby Larsen (born 1950)
- Tania León (born 1943)

== M ==
- Linda Martinez (1975–2005)
- Josephine McGill (1877–1919)
- Cindy McTee (born 1953)
- Missy Mazzoli (born 1980)
- Meredith Monk (born 1942)

== O ==
- Pauline Oliveros (1932–2016)

== P ==
- Judith Palmer
- Julia Perry
- Florence Price (1887–1953)

== R ==
- Nancy Raabe (born 1954)
- Shulamit Ran (born 1947)

== S ==
- Laura Schwendinger (born 1962)
- Amy Scurria (born 1973)
- Ruth Crawford Seeger (1901–1953)
- Alex Shapiro (born 1962)
- Judith Shatin (born 1949)
- Caroline Shaw (born 1982)
- Faye-Ellen Silverman (born 1947)
- Netty Simons (1913–1994)
- Linda Catlin Smith (born 1957)
- Cristina Spinei (born 1984)
- Pauline Anna Strom (1946–2020)

== T ==
- Augusta Read Thomas (born 1964)
- Karen P. Thomas (born 1957)
- Joan Tower (born 1938)

== V ==
- Lois V. Vierk (born 1951)

== W ==
- Melinda Wagner (born 1957)
- Shirley Walker (1945-2006)
- Gwyneth Van Anden Walker (born 1947)
- Wang Jie (born 1980)
- Edwina Florence Wills (1915–2002)
- Diane Wittry
- Julia Wolfe (born 1958)

== Z ==
- Pamela Z (born 1956)
- Ellen Taaffe Zwilich (born 1939)
