= Mädchenkantorei Limburg =

Girls' choir in Limburg, Germany

Mädchenkantorei am Hohen Dom zu Limburg
- Choir
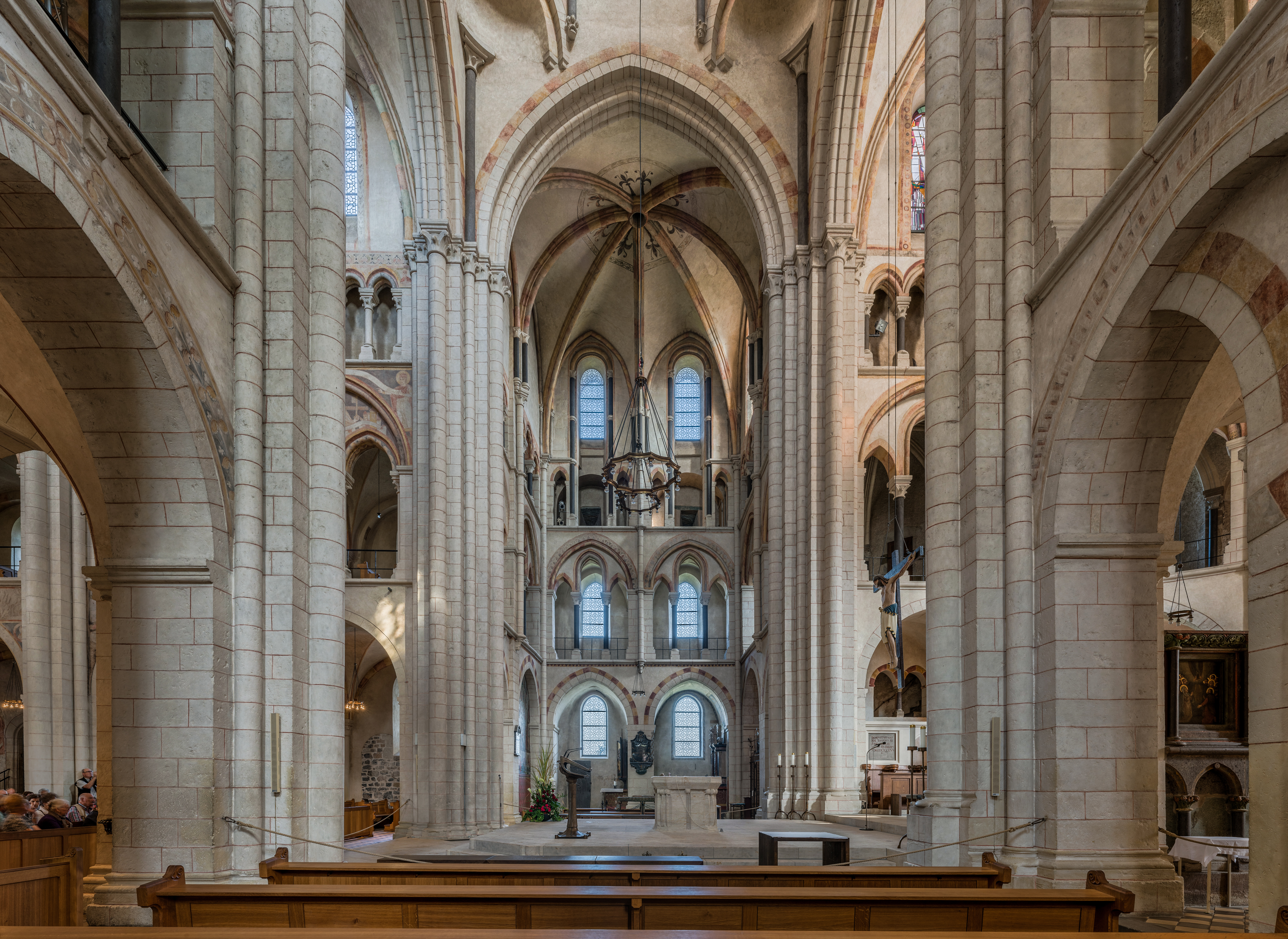
- Interior of the Limburg Cathedral
- Origin: Limburg, Hesse, German
- Founded: 1971
- Genre: Girls' choir
- Chief conductor: Judith Kunz

Mädchenkantorei Limburg (Limburg Girls' Choir; German: [̍ˈmɛːdçɛn kantoːˈraɪ ˈlɪmbʊrg]), officially Mädchenkantorei am Hohen Dom zu Limburg (Girls' Choir of the High Cathedral at Limburg), is a girls' cathedral choir at Limburg Cathedral in Limburg, Hesse, Germany. The choir was founded in 1971 by Hans Bernhard. The choir's main task is singing in services at the Limburg Cathedral. The choir also performs in other services and concerts. Their repertoire covers all eras of classical music, but has a focus on contemporary music.

== History ==
The Mädchenkantorei was founded by cathedral chapel master (German: Domkapellmeister) Hans Bernhard in 1971 and is one of the oldest girls' choirs in German cathedrals. The primary purpose of the choir is to sing during services at Limburg Cathedral. They perform there monthly, while other services are sung by the Limburger Domchor and the Limburger Domsingknaben. The choir also performs in services within and outside of the Diocese of Limburg as well as in concerts. Their repertoire spans eras from Gregorian chant to Baroque music, the Classical period, Romantic music and contemporary music.

The conductor is the cathedral choir director (German: Domchordirektorin), Judith Kunz. Girls may join the choir from the last year of kindergarten, and receive a thorough musical education until they finish school. They rehearse at four levels. From the fifth school year, they are trained at the highest level in the A Choir, or chamber choir (Kammerchor). At this level, the girls perform internationally, putting on concerts in Austria, France, England, Italy, Sweden and the United States, and taking part in competitions. In 2017, they won the first prize in their category, "Mädchen und Jugendchöre, gleiche Stimmen, 12–22 Jahre" (Girls' and youth choirs, similar [high] voices, ages 12 to 22).

In February 2019, the choir sang a program of sacred contemporary music together with the women's choir Carpe Diem at Limburg Cathedral. They performed works by Ola Gjeilo, Thomas Jennefelt, Arvo Pärt, Imant Raminsh, Enjott Schneider and Joan Szymko, some of which were accompanied by cello and marimba.

Among the former choir members is soprano Julia Kleiter.
