= Women's choir =

Choir consisting exclusively of women

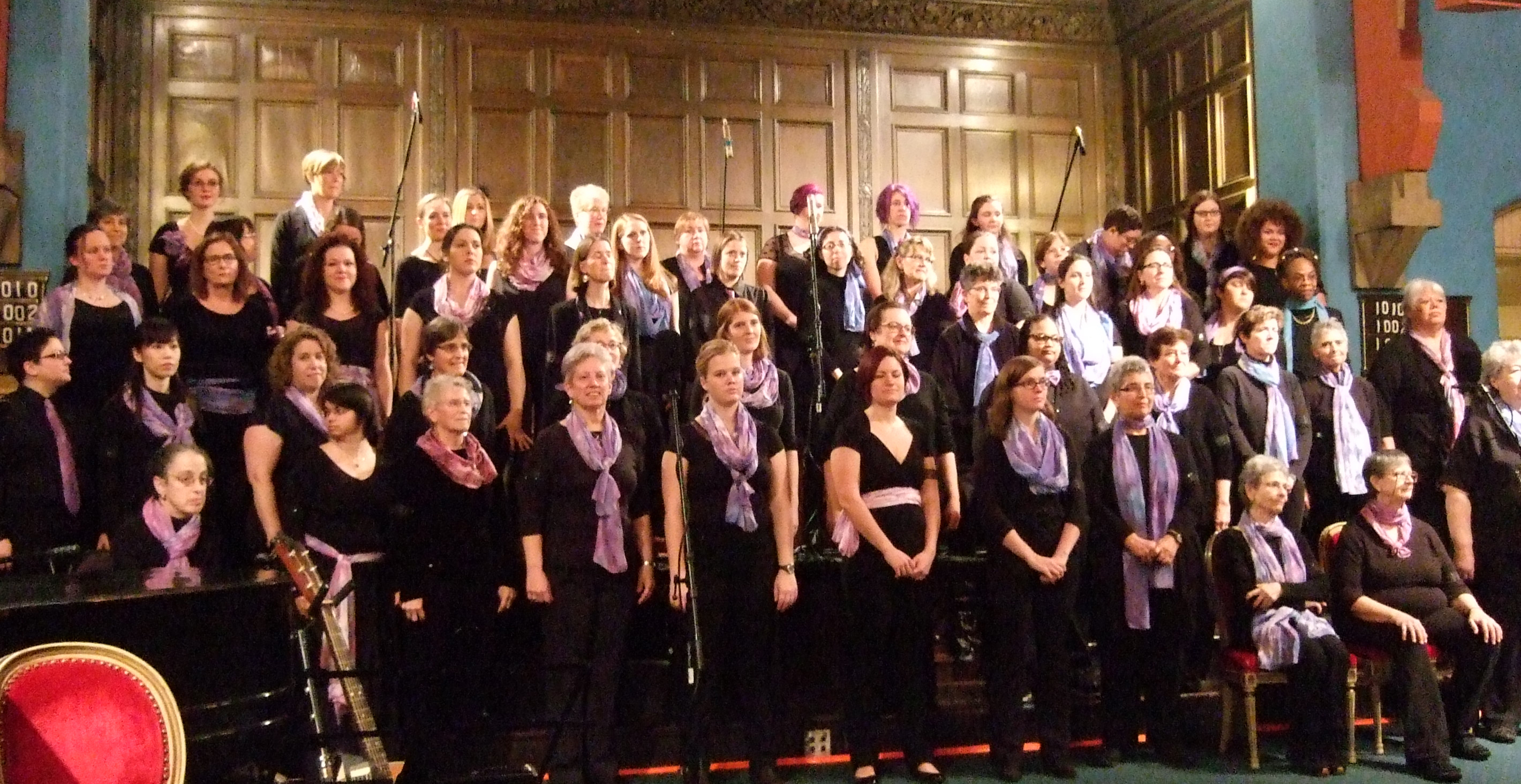
Anna Crusis Women's Choir in 2014

A women's choir or women's chorus is a choir formed exclusively by women. If all singers are young, it is called a girls' choir. The voice types are usually soprano and alto, SSAA. The names are also used for music especially composed for such groups.

== History ==
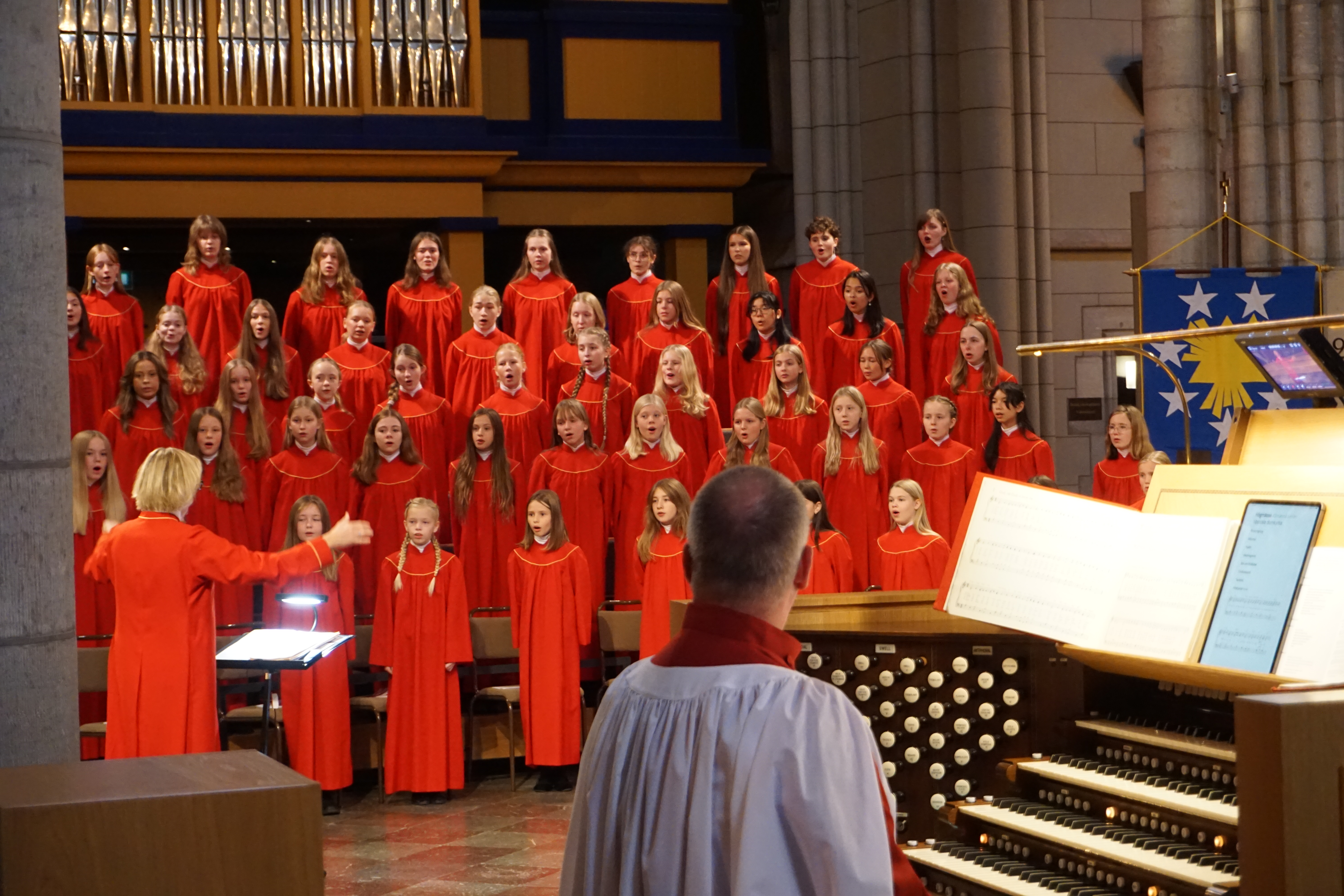
The Uppsala Cathedral girl's choir for young girls and adolescents singing during the consecration mass of two new bishops.

In Egypt, women's choirs were documented for singers in temples since the Middle Kingdom. In Assyria and Palestine, women's choirs sang to honour a victorious king. Women's choirs appeared in ancient Greek tragedy. Laments of deaths were performed by groups of women in Assyria and Judaism, among others.

In early Christianity, responsorial singing was practiced by women alternating with men, but with the late 4th century, women's singing in church was repressed. In nuns' monasteries, singing of women's choirs was regular in church services. Hildegard von Bingen composed sacred plays with music for women's choir.

Venetian orphanages (ospedali) for girls became a focus for music for women's voices. The girls received musical training, beginning in the 16th century, and their concerts attracted tourists for centuries. Composers such as Giovanni Legrenzi, Johann Rosenmüller, Johann Adolph Hasse, Nicola Porpora, Baldassare Galuppi, Niccolò Jommelli, Domenico Cimarosa and Antonio Vivaldi wrote choral and instrumental compositions for these institutions. Charles Burney, Johann Joachim Quantz and Johann Wolfgang von Goethe reported positively of performances. Usually the choral music was set for four vocal parts, two soprano and two alto parts. Some lists contain names classified as tenor and bass. Johann Friedrich Reichardt mentioned in 1791 women tenors in a bass function.

== Contemporary women's choirs ==
Women's choirs have a tradition in many countries. They are frequent in schools, colleges and universities. Some, such as the Mädchenkantorei Limburg, a group at the Limburg Cathedral founded in 1971, are associated with ecclesiastical organizations. Others operate independently, such as the Mädchenchor Hannover, an award-winning choir of girls and young women founded in 1951 in Hanover, the Anna Crusis Women's Choir, the oldest feminist choir in the U.S. founded in 1975, and the Melodia Women's Choir, founded in 2003 to promote new music.
