= Louise Christine Rebe =

Louise Christine Rebe (7 January 1900 – 30 December 1978) was an American composer, music educator and pianist who composed many pedagogical pieces for young piano students.

Rebe was born in Philadelphia, Pennsylvania, to Christina Beck and Hermann Rebe. Her father was a tenor who encouraged her to begin performing as a pianist in local concerts when she was ten years old. Rebe earned a B.S. in education from the University of Pennsylvania as well as a diploma from the Steinberg School of Music in Philadelphia. She studied with Dr. Morrison Boyd and with Tobias Matthay in England. Her students included Catherine Roma.

Rebe wrote at least one article ("Practical and Profitable Piano Recital"), which was published in The Etude Magazine in September 1931. She composed many pedagogical pieces for young piano students, including works for John Thompson's Students Series and John M. Williams' Educational Series, which are still in use today. Rebe's music was widely published, by Boston Music Company; Chart Music Publishing House; Clayton F. Summy Company; M. Witmark and Sons; Summy Birchard Company; Theodore Presser Company; and Willis Music Company, among others.

Rebe died on 30 December, 1978, when she and a visiting friend were stabbed to death by her next door neighbor's teen-aged son.
