= Thomas Carr (publisher) =

Thomas Carr (London, 1780 – Philadelphia, April 15, 1849) was an American music publisher, composer, and organist. He was the son of Joseph Carr and the brother of Benjamin.

== Biography ==
Born in London and, like his father, descended from a long line of publisher-merchants, he immigrated with his parents to Baltimore in February 1794, where he joined his father's business. He also became the organist at Christ Church, where he worked from 1798 to 1811.

He ran his father's business after he inherited it in 1819, but relocated it to Philadelphia, where he sold the catalog to publisher George Willig. He opened his own shop on Fourth Street early in 1824, and later that year opened a Musical Academy on Second Street.

== Publications ==
In the fall of 1814, at the request of Francis Scott Key, he adapted the words of The Star-Spangled Banner and harmonized it to the tune "To Anacreon in Heav'n" by John Stafford Smith, creating the first edition of the work.

In 1840 he composed two songs for the political campaign of William Henry Harrison, "Turn Out! To the Rescue!" and the popular "Old Tippecanoe's Raisin", whose tune partially quotes Yankee Doodle.

He composed a few instrumental compositions, including a brief, charming piano piece for "Juvenile Performers" titled "The Old Russian March" (1841).
