= Catherine Roma =

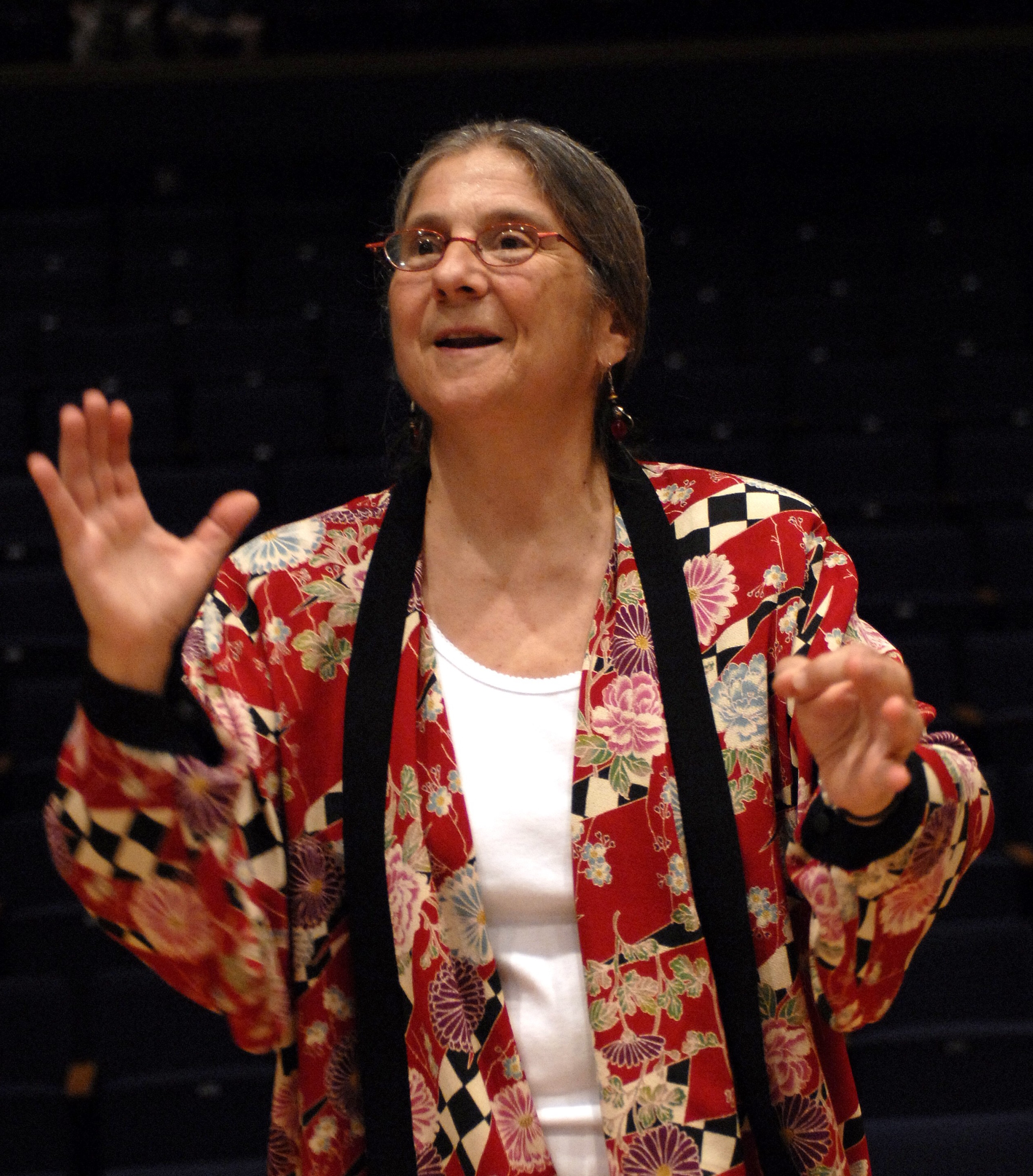
- Catherine Roma conducting MUSE's 25th Anniversary Spring Concert, Cincinnati, Ohio.

Background information
- Born: 1948 (age 77–78); Philadelphia, Pennsylvania, United States
- Genre: Choral
- Occupations: Choral conductor, Professor of music, activist

Catherine Roma (born 1948) is an American choral conductor and activist. She was a founding conductor and organizer of the US women's choral movement. She founded the feminist Anna Crusis Women's Choir in Philadelphia, Pennsylvania in 1975, the MUSE women's choir in Cincinnati in 1984, the Martin Luther King Coalition Choir in 1992, and the World House Choir in Yellow Springs, Ohio, in 2012.

External videos
- “Cathy Roma Interview”, GALA Choruses

== Biography ==
Catherine Roma was born in Philadelphia on January 29, 1948. She attended Germantown Friends School, a Quaker School. Roma earned degrees in music and choral conducting at the University of Wisconsin–Madison and became involved in lesbian and feminist politics while studying there. While in Wisconsin she worked with historian Ann D. Gordon to identify music by and about women throughout history, creating the folk opera American Women: A Choral History for the United States Bicentennial. After returning to Philadelphia in 1975 to teach music at Abington Friends School, she formed the Anna Crusis Women's Choir, which performed American Women: A Choral History at a number of colleges throughout the northeast. Her teachers included Louise Christine Rebe.

By starting Anna Crusis, the first feminist women’s choir in the United States, Roma became one of the founding mothers of the women's choral movement. Her beliefs in feminism, social justice, and Quaker models of leadership fundamentally shaped the mission and direction of Anna Crusis. Decisions were often made through a process similar to Quaker consensus, in which all members had a voice.

Roma left Anna in 1983 to pursue a graduate degree in music at the University of Cincinnati's College-Conservatory of Music, receiving her Doctor of Musical Arts Degree in 1989. In 1984, Roma founded MUSE, a.k.a. Cincinnati's Women's Choir. Working with Wilmington College at the Warren Correctional Institution, Roma helped to establish the UMOJA Men's chorus. In 2012, she co-founded the diverse, mixed voice World House Choir, in Yellow Springs, Ohio. The name for the World House Choir is taken from a reflection by Martin Luther King Jr. in which he likens the modern world to a house that we must live in together.

In 2008, Roma won the Governor’s Arts Award from the Ohio Arts Council and Ohio Citizens for the Arts Foundation for her involvement in community development and participation. Roma received a Lifetime Achievement Award from the Gay and Lesbian Association of Choruses in 2012. She received the University of Cincinnati Alumni Association Mosaic Award in 2014 for her use of "music as a means of inclusion and understanding".

Roma lives in Yellow Springs, Ohio.
