= The Star-Spangled Banner =

National anthem of the United States

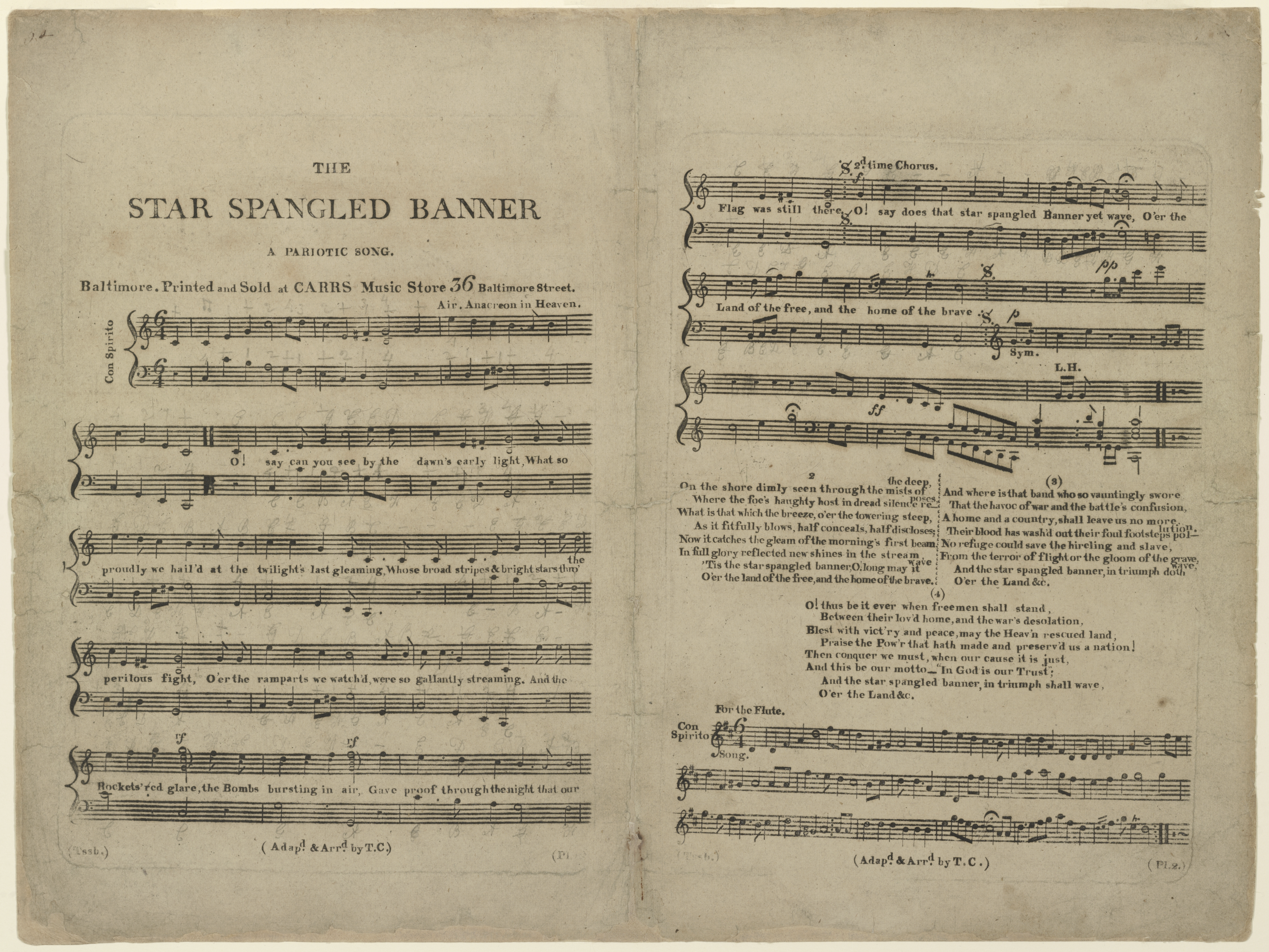
- The earliest surviving sheet music of "The Star-Spangled Banner" from 1814
- National anthem of the United States
- Lyrics: Francis Scott Key, 1814
- Music: John Stafford Smith, 1773 (arranged by Walter Damrosch and John Philip Sousa, 1918)
- Published: 1814 by Carr's Music Store
- Adopted: 3 March 1931
- Preceded by: "Hail, Columbia" (de facto) "My Country, 'Tis of Thee" (de facto)

Audio sample
- Instrumental version by the United States Navy Band in B-flat major: file; help

"The Star-Spangled Banner" is the national anthem of the United States. The lyrics come from the "Defence of Fort M'Henry", a poem written by American lawyer Francis Scott Key on September 14, 1814, after he witnessed the bombardment of Fort McHenry by the British Royal Navy during the Battle of Baltimore in the War of 1812. Key was inspired by the large U.S. flag, with 15 stars and 15 stripes, known as the Star-Spangled Banner, flying triumphantly above the fort after the battle.

The poem was set to the music of a popular British song written by John Stafford Smith for the Anacreontic Society, a gentlemen's club in London. Smith's song, "The Anacreontic Song", with various lyrics, was already popular in the United States. This setting, renamed "The Star-Spangled Banner", soon became a popular patriotic song. With a range of 19 semitones, it is known for being very difficult to sing, in part because the melody sung today is the soprano part. Although the poem has four stanzas, typically only the first is performed with the other three being rarely sung. Most performances of the song today are based on a 1918 arrangement authored by Walter Damrosch and John Philip Sousa on behalf of the U.S. Bureau of Education. "The Star-Spangled Banner" was first recognized for official use by the United States Navy in 1889. On March 3, 1931, the U.S. Congress passed a joint resolution (46 Stat. 1508) making the song the official national anthem of the United States, which President Herbert Hoover signed into law. The resolution is now codified at 36 U.S.C. § 301(a).

== History ==
=== Francis Scott Key's lyrics ===
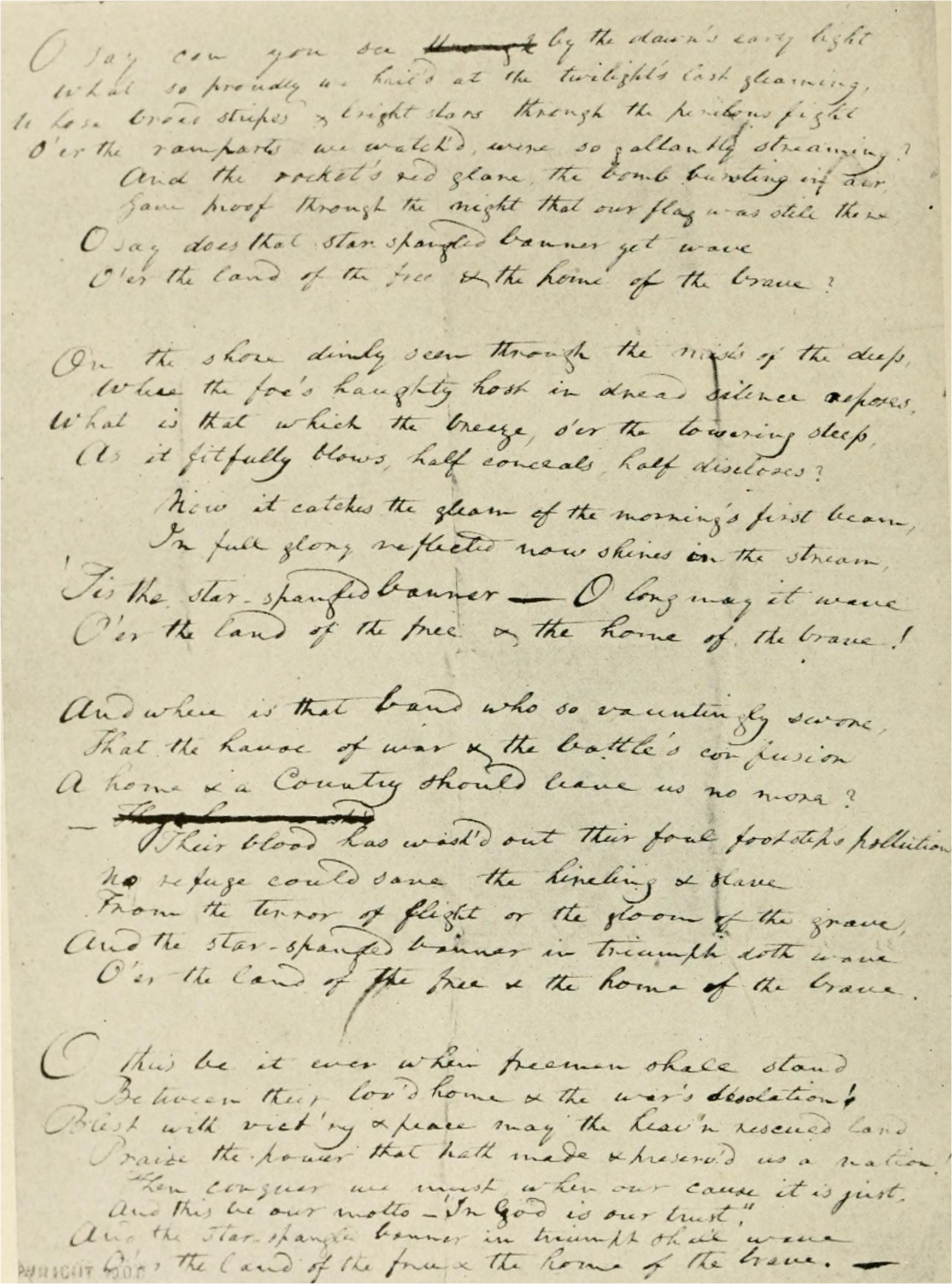
Francis Scott Key's original manuscript copy of his "Defence of Fort M'Henry" poem, now on display at the Maryland Historical Society

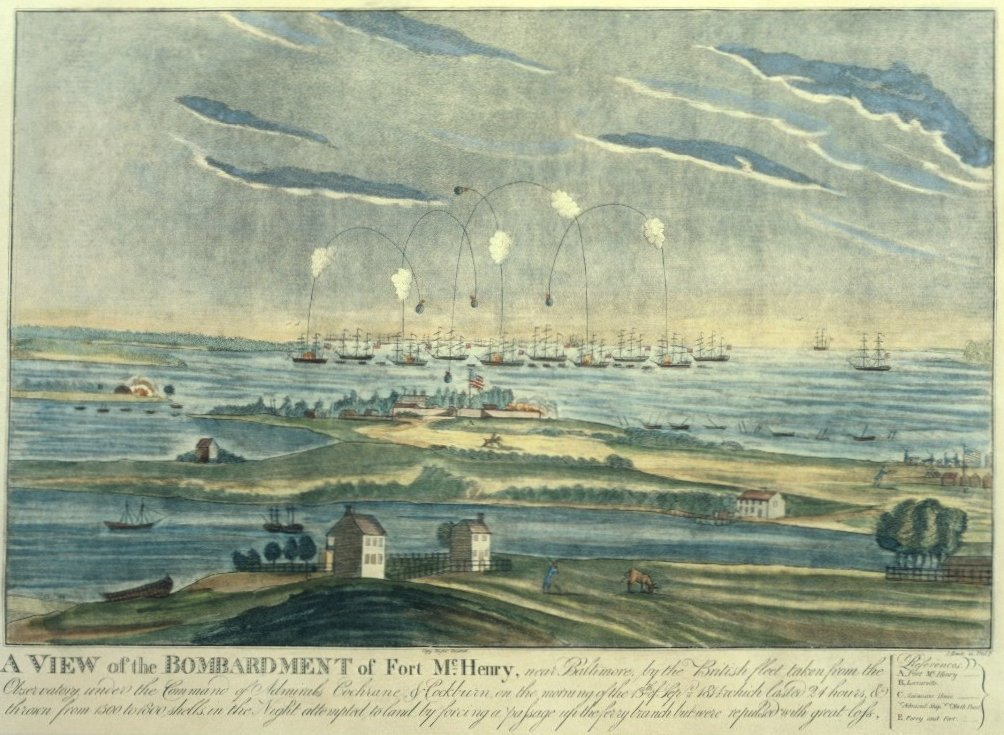
An artist's rendering of the battle at Fort McHenry

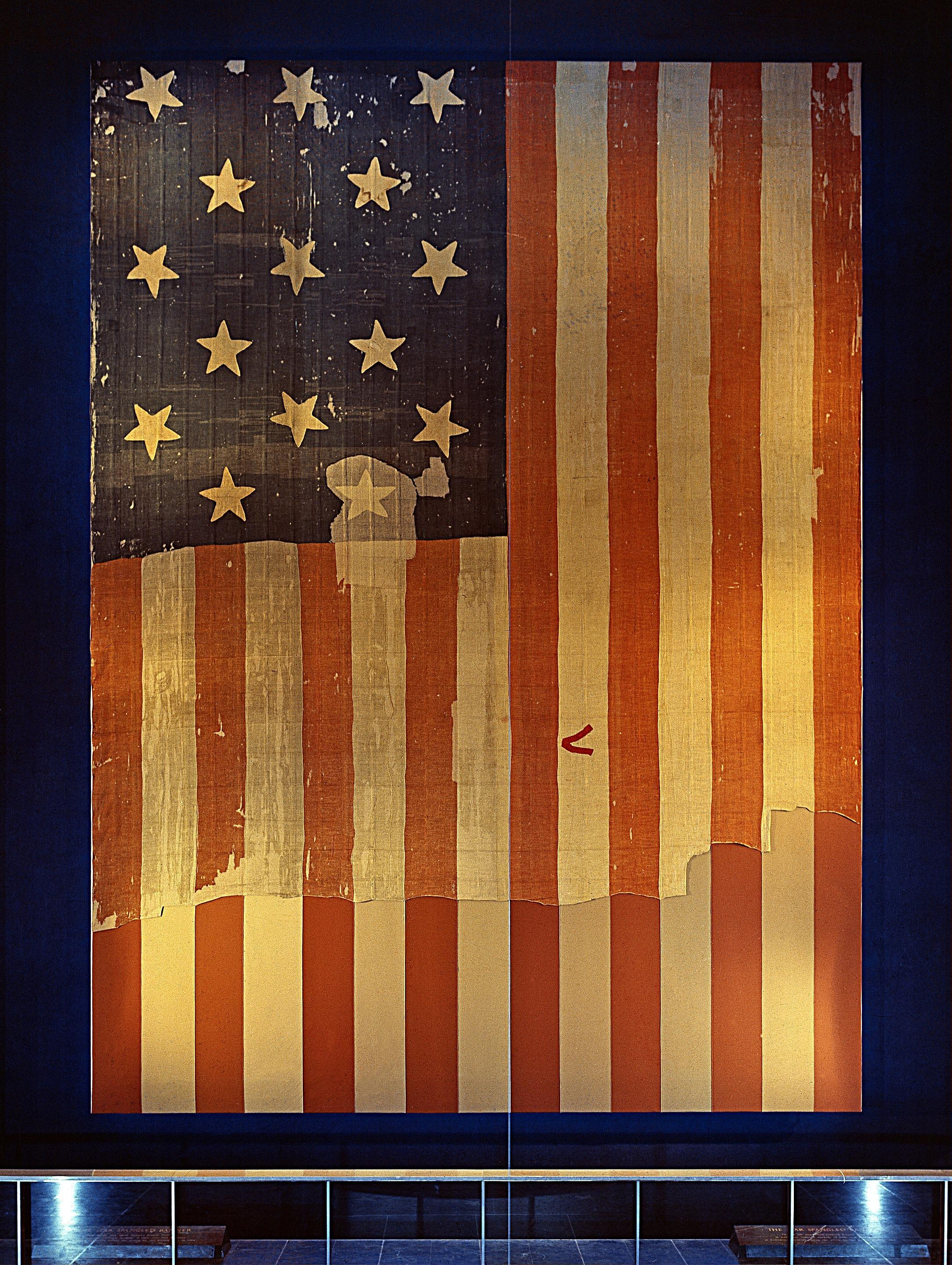
The 15-star, 15-stripe "Star-Spangled Banner" that inspired the poem

On August 28, 1814, William Beanes, a physician who resided in Upper Marlboro, Maryland, was arrested by British forces in his home after the burning of Washington and the Raid on Alexandria. A friend of Key's, Beanes was accused of aiding the detention of several British Army stragglers who were ransacking local homesteads in search of food.

On September 2, 1814, Key wrote a letter from his home in Georgetown to his mother, ending with:

I am going in the morning to Baltimore to proceed in a flag-vessel to Genl Ross. Old Dr Beanes of Marlbro' is taken prisoner by the Enemy, who threaten to carry him off – Some of his friends have urged me to apply for a flag & go & try to procure his release. I hope to return in about 8 or 10 days, though [it] is uncertain, as I do not know where to find the fleet. – As soon as I get back I hope I shall be able to set out for Fred[ericksburg] – ...

Under sanction from President Madison, on September 3, Key traveled 40 miles (64 km) by land from Washington, D.C., to Baltimore, where he arrived on the morning of September 4. He located Col. John Stuart Skinner, an American agent for prisoners of war, who leased a 60-foot (18.3 m) sloop-rigged packet ship belonging to John and Benjamin Ferguson, brothers who owned a cargo and passenger service between Baltimore and Norfolk. The ship had a nine-man crew and was captained by a co-owner, John Ferguson. They sailed from Baltimore the next day (September 5) out through the Patapsco River and then south, down the Chesapeake Bay. As recorded in the British ships' logs, on September 6, they had rendezvoused with HMS Royal Oak and several British troopships near the mouth of the Patuxant. There they learned Beanes was aboard HMS Tonnant further down in the bay. Rear Admiral Pulteney Malcolm assigned the frigate Hebrus to escort the American sloop to Tangier Island, where he thought Tonnant was located.

On September 7, around noon, they spotted Tonnant near the mouth of the Potomac. The flagship then anchored and brought Key and Skinner aboard.

It was aboard Tonnant, after dinner, that Skinner and Key secured the release of Beanes after conversing with Major-General Robert Ross and Vice-Admiral Alexander Cochrane. Ross initially refused to release Beanes, but relented after reading letters, brought by Key, written by wounded British prisoners of war praising American doctors for their kind treatment. Because Key and Skinner had overheard details of the plans for the attack on Baltimore, they were prevented from going ashore until after the battle, several days later.

From Tonnant, Key, Skinner, and Beanes were transferred to the frigate HMS Surprise on the morning of September 8. The fleet then slowly moved up the Chesapeake toward Baltimore. The truce vessel was in tow with Surprise. On September 11, off the North Point peninsula, Colonel Skinner insisted that they be transferred back to their own truce vessel, which they were allowed to do, under guard. It was still tethered to Surprise. Admiral Cochrane then transferred his flag to the shallow-draft Surprise so he could move in with the bombardment squadron. Having advanced into the Patapsco River, the 16-ship attack force began to fire on Fort McHenry at sunrise on September 13; the bombardment would last 25 hours.

During the rainy day and through the night, Key had witnessed the bombardment and observed that the fort's smaller "storm flag" (17 by 25 feet (5.2 by 7.6 m)) continued to fly, but once the bomb and Congreve rocket barrage had stopped, he would not know how the battle had turned out until dawn. On the morning of September 14, the storm flag had been lowered and the large garrison flag (30 by 42 feet (9.1 by 12.8 m)) had been raised.

During the bombardment, HMS Erebus provided the "rockets' red glare", while the heavy-mortar bomb ships HMS Terror, Volcano, Devastation, Meteor and Aetna provided the "bombs bursting in air". Around 1,500 to 1,800 bomb shells and over 700 rockets were fired at the fort but with minimal casualties and damage being done. Four men died and 24 were wounded in the fort. The ships were forced to fire from their maximum range (with minimal accuracy) to stay out of range of the fort's formidable cannon fire.

Key was inspired by the U.S. victory and the sight of the large U.S. flag flying triumphantly above the fort. This flag (as well as the storm flag), with 15 stars and 15 stripes, had been made by Mary Young Pickersgill together with other workers in her home on Baltimore's Pratt Street. The flag later came to be known as the Star-Spangled Banner, and is today on display in the National Museum of American History, a treasure of the Smithsonian Institution. It was restored in 1914 by Amelia Fowler, and again in 1998 as part of an ongoing conservation program.

Aboard the ship that morning, Key began writing his lyrics on the back of a letter he had kept in his pocket. Late afternoon on September 16, Key, Skinner and Beanes were released from the fleet and they arrived in Baltimore that evening. He completed the poem at the Indian Queen Hotel, where he was staying. His finished manuscript was untitled and unsigned. When printed as a broadside, the next day, it was given the title "Defence of Fort M'Henry". It was first published nationally in The Analectic Magazine.

Much of the idea of the poem, including the flag imagery and some of the wording, is derived from an earlier song by Key, also set to the tune of "The Anacreontic Song". The song, known as "When the Warrior Returns", was written in honor of Stephen Decatur and Charles Stewart on their return from the First Barbary War.

Since the 1990s, the anthem has become controversial due to perceived racism in the anthem's lyrics and Key's active support of slavery. The anthem's third stanza uses the phrase "the hireling and slave", which had been interpreted by several commentators to refer to American slaves who escaped to the British military during the war, as Britain offered them freedom and the opportunity to join the Corps of Colonial Marines to fight against U.S. forces. Key was also a slaveholder throughout much of his life. According to The Nation, Key's "message to the blacks fighting for freedom was unmistakable—we will hunt you down and the search will leave you in terror because, when we find you, your next stop is the gloom of the grave". The reference to slaves, which was perceived as being racist towards Black Americans, purportedly prevented the song being adopted as the U.S. national anthem for almost a century.

Conversely, University of Michigan professor Mark Clague and Key's biographer has claimed that the poem celebrates the courage of the American soldiers, both black and white, who helped defend the fortress and the city. The controversial phrase, "the hireling and the slave", according to Clague, actually refers to British armed forces personnel and their American collaborators regardless of race, who are promised either death on the battlefield or, similarly to United Empire Loyalists after the American Revolution, permanent exile once the British Empire is defeated. This interpretation is consistent with what Celticist Michael Newton has written about how, during the American Revolution, "slavery" and "oppression" were routinely used as Patriot code words for continued "British rule" over the United States.

Also according to Clague, Francis Scott Key freed four of the seven slaves he inherited and was involved in his later years with the American Colonization Society's practice of buying slaves and setting them free in what is now Liberia. Key's poem, according to Clague, "in no way glorifies or celebrates slavery." However, Clague's interpretation of the song has been criticised for going against mainstream academic historical consensus, as the majority of recent scholars who have written about slavery during the War of 1812, such as Gene A. Smith, Marc Leepson and David Roediger have alleged that Key was referencing only American runaway slaves rather than late stage American Loyalists in the passage. In 2016, The New Yorker argued that "[is] 'The Star-Spangled Banner' racist? The short answer is yes, insofar as almost every older piece of American iconography cannot be rid of the stain of slavery."

=== John Stafford Smith's music ===
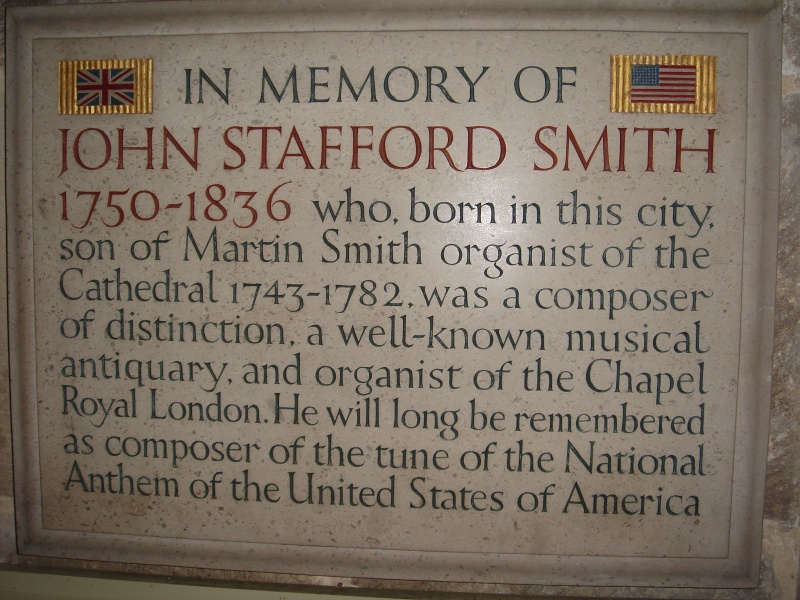
A memorial to John Stafford Smith in Gloucester Cathedral in Gloucester, England

Key gave the poem to his brother-in-law Joseph H. Nicholson who saw that the words fit the popular melody "The Anacreontic Song", by English composer John Stafford Smith. This was the official song of the Anacreontic Society, an 18th-century gentlemen's club of amateur musicians in London. Nicholson took the poem to a printer in Baltimore, who anonymously made the first known broadside printing on September 17; of these, two known copies survive.

On September 20, both the Baltimore Patriot and The American printed the song, with the note "Tune: Anacreon in Heaven". The song quickly became popular; it was ultimately printed in 17 newspapers from Georgia to New Hampshire. Soon after, Thomas Carr of the Carr Music Store in Baltimore published the words and music together under the title "The Star Spangled Banner", although it was originally called "Defence of Fort M'Henry". Thomas Carr's arrangement introduced the raised fourth which became the standard deviation from "The Anacreontic Song". The song's popularity increased and its first public performance took place in October when Baltimore actor Ferdinand Durang sang it at Captain McCauley's tavern. Washington Irving, then editor of the Analectic Magazine in Philadelphia, reprinted the song in November 1814.

By the early 20th century, there were various versions of the song in popular use. Seeking a singular, standard version, President Woodrow Wilson tasked the U.S. Bureau of Education with providing that official version. In response, the Bureau enlisted the help of five musicians to agree upon an arrangement. Those musicians were Walter Damrosch, Will Earhart, Arnold J. Gantvoort, Oscar Sonneck and John Philip Sousa. The standardized version that was voted upon by these five musicians premiered at Carnegie Hall on December 5, 1917, in a program that included Edward Elgar's Carillon and Gabriel Pierné's The Children's Crusade. The concert was put on by the Oratorio Society of New York and conducted by Walter Damrosch. An official handwritten version of the final votes of these five men has been found and shows all five men's votes tallied, measure by measure.

=== National anthem ===
The Star-Spangled Banner
- Long title: An Act To make The Star-Spangled Banner the national anthem of the United States of America.
- Enacted by: the 71st United States Congress
- Effective: March 3, 1931

Citations
- Public law: Pub. L. 71–823
- Statutes at Large: 46 Stat. 1508

Legislative history
- Introduced in the House as H.R. 14 by J. Charles Linthicum (D–MD) on April 15, 1929; Committee consideration by House Judiciary; Passed the House on April 21, 1930; Passed the Senate on March 3, 1931; Signed into law by President Herbert Hoover on March 3, 1931

The song gained popularity throughout the 19th century, and bands played it during public events such as Independence Day celebrations.

A plaque displayed at Fort Meade, South Dakota, claims that the idea of making "The Star Spangled Banner" the national anthem began on their parade ground in 1892. Colonel Caleb Carlton, post commander, established the tradition that the song be played "at retreat and at the close of parades and concerts." Carlton explained the custom to Governor Sheldon of South Dakota who "promised me that he would try to have the custom established among the state militia." Carlton wrote that after a similar discussion, Secretary of War Daniel S. Lamont issued an order that it "be played at every Army post every evening at retreat."

In 1889, the U.S. Navy officially adopted "The Star-Spangled Banner". In 1916, President Woodrow Wilson ordered that "The Star-Spangled Banner" be played at military and other appropriate occasions. The playing of the song two years later during the seventh-inning stretch of Game One of the 1918 World Series, and thereafter during each game of the series is often cited as the first instance that the anthem was played at a baseball game, though evidence shows that the "Star-Spangled Banner" was performed as early as 1897 at Opening Day ceremonies in Philadelphia and then more regularly at the Polo Grounds in New York City beginning in 1898. The tradition of performing the national anthem before every baseball game began in World War II.

In 1918, the Maryland Society of the United States Daughters of 1812, led by Ella Virginia Houck Holloway, launched a campaign to establish the song as the official national anthem of the United States.

Between 1918 and 1929, John Charles Linthicum, the U.S. congressman from Maryland at the time, introduced a series of six unsuccessful bills to officially recognize "The Star-Spangled Banner" as the national anthem.

In 1927, with the thought that "The Star-Spangled Banner" was unsuited for a national anthem, the National Federation of Music Clubs sponsored a composition contest to nominate a national anthem. They selected the text of America The Beautiful; 901 compositions were submitted for the $1,500 prize (equivalent to $27,802 in 2025). Frank Damrosch, Frederick Converse, Felix Borowski, and Peter Lutkin judged the compositions but nominated no winner.

On November 3, 1929, Robert Ripley drew a panel in his syndicated cartoon, Ripley's Believe it or Not!, saying "Believe It or Not, America has no national anthem".

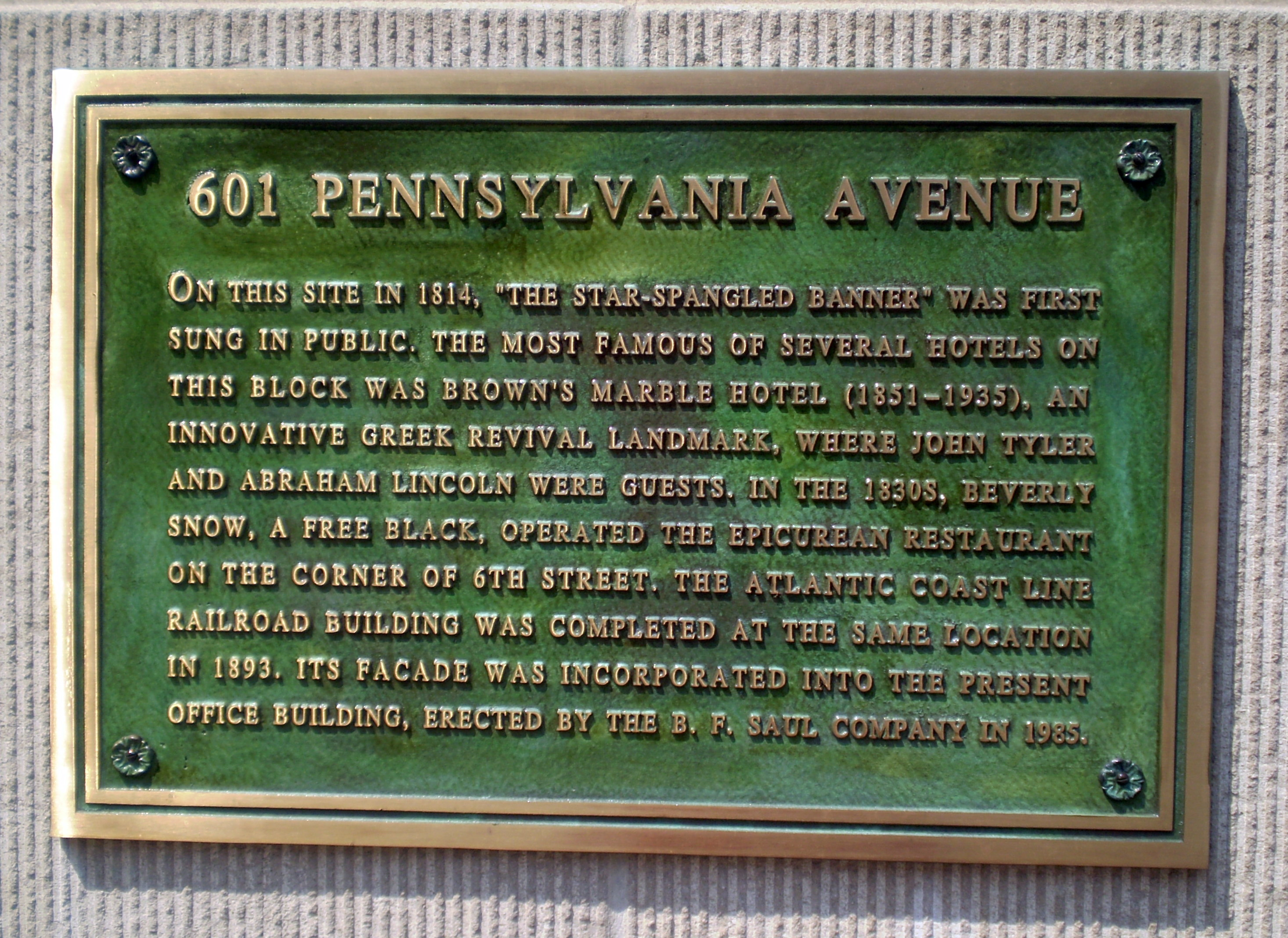
A commemorative plaque in Washington, D.C., marking the site at 601 Pennsylvania Avenue where "The Star-Spangled Banner" was first publicly sung

In 1930, Veterans of Foreign Wars started a petition for the United States to officially recognize "The Star-Spangled Banner" as the national anthem. Five million people signed the petition. The petition was presented to the United States House Committee on the Judiciary on January 31, 1930. On the same day, Elsie Jorss-Reilley and Grace Evelyn Boudlin sang the song to the committee to refute the perception that it was too high pitched for a typical person to sing. The committee voted in favor of sending the bill to the House floor for a vote. The House of Representatives passed the bill later that year. The Senate passed the bill on March 3, 1931. President Herbert Hoover signed the bill on March 4, 1931, officially adopting "The Star-Spangled Banner" as the national anthem of the United States of America. As currently codified, the United States Code states that "[t]he composition consisting of the words and music known as the Star-Spangled Banner is the national anthem." Although all four stanzas of the poem officially compose the National Anthem, only the first stanza is generally sung, the other three being much less well known.

Before 1931, other songs served as the hymns of U.S. officialdom. "Hail, Columbia" served this purpose at official functions for most of the 19th century. "My Country, 'Tis of Thee", whose melody is identical to "God Save the King", the United Kingdom's national anthem, also served as a de facto national anthem. Following the War of 1812 and subsequent U.S. wars, other songs emerged to compete for popularity at public events, among them "America the Beautiful", which itself was being considered before 1931 as a candidate to become the national anthem of the United States.

In the fourth verse, Key's 1814 published version of the poem is written as, "And this be our motto-"In God is our trust!"" In 1956 when 'In God We Trust' was under consideration to be adopted as the national motto of the United States by the US Congress, the words of the fourth verse of The Star Spangled Banner were brought up in arguments supporting adoption of the motto.

== Modern history ==
=== Performances ===
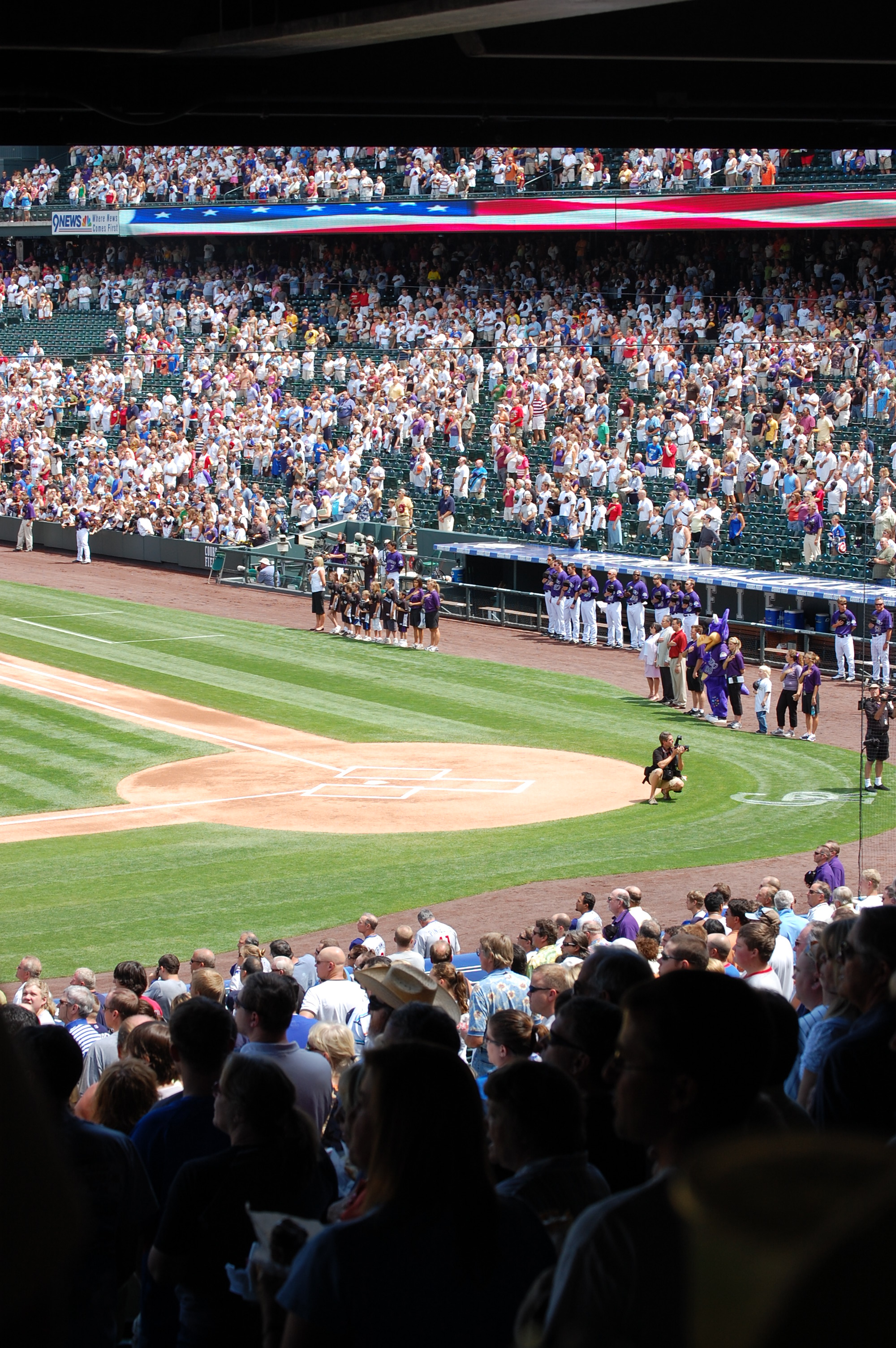
Crowd performing the U.S. national anthem before a baseball game at Coors Field in Denver

The song is notoriously difficult for nonprofessionals to sing because of its wide range – a twelfth. Humorist Richard Armour referred to the song's difficulty in his book It All Started With Columbus:

In an attempt to take Baltimore, the British attacked Fort McHenry, which protected the harbor. Bombs were soon bursting in air, rockets were glaring, and all in all it was a moment of great historical interest. During the bombardment, a young lawyer named Francis Off Key [sic] wrote "The Star-Spangled Banner", and when, by the dawn's early light, the British heard it sung, they fled in terror.

Professional and amateur singers have been known to forget the words, which is one reason the song is sometimes pre-recorded and lip-synced. Pop singer Christina Aguilera performed wrong lyrics to the song prior to Super Bowl XLV, replacing the song's fourth line, "o'er the ramparts we watched were so gallantly streaming", with an alteration of the second line, "what so proudly we watched at the twilight's last gleaming". Other times the issue is avoided by having the performer(s) play the anthem instrumentally instead of singing it. The pre-recording of the anthem has become standard practice at some ballparks, such as Boston's Fenway Park, according to the SABR publication The Fenway Project.

"The Star-Spangled Banner" has been performed regularly at the beginning of NFL games since the end of WWII by order of NFL commissioner Elmer Layden. The song has also been intermittently performed at baseball games since after WWI. The National Hockey League and Major League Soccer both require venues in both the U.S. and Canada to perform both the Canadian and U.S. national anthems at games that involve teams from both countries (with the "away" anthem being performed first). It is also usual for both U.S. and Canadian anthems (done in the same way as the NHL and MLS) to be played at Major League Baseball and National Basketball Association games involving the Toronto Blue Jays and the Toronto Raptors respectively, the only Canadian teams in those two major U.S. sports leagues, and in All Star Games in MLB, the NBA, and the NHL. The Buffalo Sabres of the National Hockey League, which play in a city on the Canada–US border and have a substantial Canadian fan base, play both anthems before all home games regardless of where the visiting team is based. Recently with the NFL, NBA, NHL, and MLB playing international games outside of the United States and Canada, "The Star-Spangled Banner" has been performed alongside the host country's national anthem.

Two especially unusual performances of the song took place in the immediate aftermath of the September 11 attacks. On September 12, 2001, Elizabeth II, the Queen of the United Kingdom, broke with tradition and allowed the Band of the Coldstream Guards to perform the anthem at Buckingham Palace, London, at the ceremonial Changing of the Guard, as a gesture of support for Britain's ally. The following day at a St. Paul's Cathedral memorial service, the Queen joined in the singing of the anthem, an unprecedented occurrence. The Star Spangled Banner was played by the Coldstream Guards again at Windsor Castle on the 20th anniversary of the attacks.

During the 2019–20 Hong Kong protests, the anthem was sung by protesters demonstrating outside the U.S. consulate-general in an appeal to the U.S. government to help them with their cause.

=== 200th anniversary celebrations ===
The 200th anniversary of the "Star-Spangled Banner" occurred in 2014 with various special events occurring throughout the United States. A particularly significant celebration occurred during the week of September 10–16 in and around Baltimore, Maryland. Highlights included playing of a new arrangement of the anthem arranged by John Williams and participation of President Barack Obama on Defenders Day, September 12, 2014, at Fort McHenry. In addition, the anthem bicentennial included a youth music celebration including the presentation of the National Anthem Bicentennial Youth Challenge winning composition written by Noah Altshuler.

=== Adaptations ===
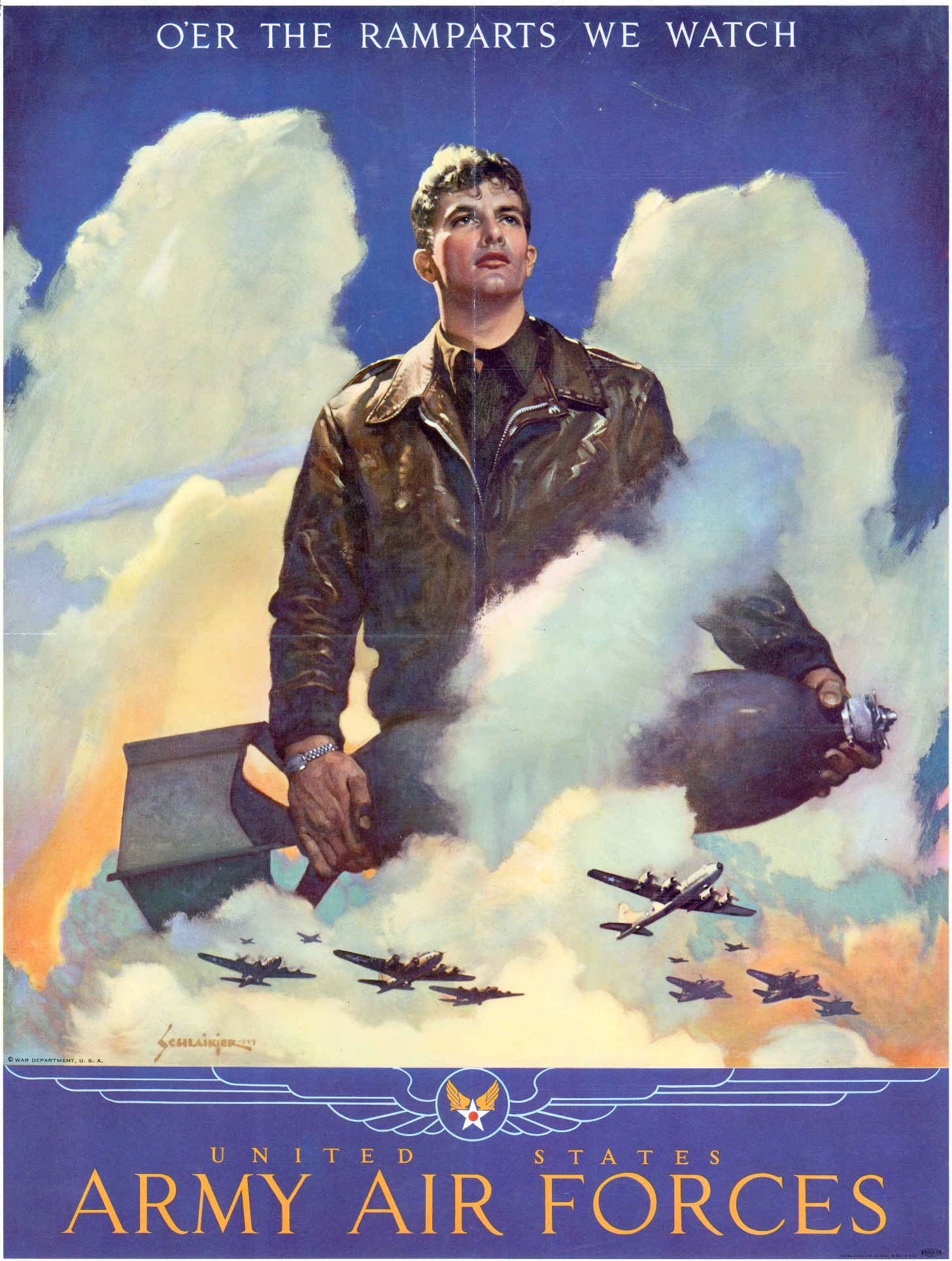
O'er the ramparts we watch in a 1945 United States Army Air Forces poster by Jes Wilhelm Schlaikjer

The first popular music performance of the anthem heard by the mainstream U.S. was by Puerto Rican singer and guitarist José Feliciano. He created a nationwide uproar when he strummed a slow, blues-style rendition of the song at Tiger Stadium in Detroit before game five of the 1968 World Series, between Detroit and St. Louis. This rendition started contemporary "Star-Spangled Banner" controversies. The response from many in the Vietnam War-era U.S. was generally negative. Despite the controversy, Feliciano's performance opened the door for the countless interpretations of the "Star-Spangled Banner" heard in the years since. One week after Feliciano's performance, the anthem was in the news again when U.S. athletes Tommie Smith and John Carlos lifted controversial raised fists at the 1968 Olympics while the "Star-Spangled Banner" played at a medal ceremony.

Rock guitarist Jimi Hendrix often included a solo instrumental performance at concerts from 1968 to his death in 1970. Using high gain and distortion amplification effects and the vibrato arm on his guitar, Hendrix was able to simulate the sounds of rockets and bombs at the points when the lyrics are normally heard. One such performance at the Woodstock music festival in 1969 was a highlight of the event's 1970 documentary film, becoming "part of the sixties Zeitgeist". When asked about negative reactions to his "unorthodox" treatment of the anthem, Hendrix, who served briefly in the U.S. Army, responded "I'm American so I played it ... Unorthodox? I thought it was beautiful, but there you go." The Woodstock version by Jimi Hendrix was inducted into the Grammy Hall of Fame in 2009.

Marvin Gaye gave a soul-influenced performance at the 1983 NBA All-Star Game and Whitney Houston gave a soulful rendition before Super Bowl XXV in 1991, which was released as a single that charted at number 20 in 1991 and number 6 in 2001 (along with José Feliciano, the only times the national anthem has been on the Billboard Hot 100). Roseanne Barr gave a controversial performance of the anthem at a San Diego Padres baseball game at Jack Murphy Stadium on July 25, 1990. The comedian belted out a screechy rendition of the song, and afterward, she mocked ballplayers by spitting and grabbing her crotch as if adjusting a protective cup. The performance offended some, including the sitting U.S. president, George H. W. Bush. Steven Tyler also caused some controversy in 2001 (at the Indianapolis 500, to which he later issued a public apology) and again in 2012 (at the AFC Championship Game) with a cappella renditions of the song with changed lyrics.

At Super Bowl XLVIII's pre-game ceremonies in 2014, soprano Renée Fleming became the first opera singer to perform the National Anthem at a football game, and her emotional, groundbreaking performance (one of the most critically acclaimed renditions of all time) led the Fox network to the highest ratings of any program in the company's history and remains so today. In 2016, Aretha Franklin performed a rendition before the nationally-televised Minnesota Vikings-Detroit Lions Thanksgiving Day game lasting more than four minutes and featuring a host of improvisations. It was one of Franklin's last public appearances before her 2018 death. Black Eyed Peas singer Fergie gave a controversial performance of the anthem during the 2018 NBA All-Star Game. Critics likened her rendition to a jazzy "sexed-up" version of the anthem, which was considered highly inappropriate, with her performance compared to that of Marilyn Monroe's 1962 performance of "Happy Birthday, Mr. President". Fergie later apologized for her performance of the song, stating that ''I'm a risk taker artistically, but clearly this rendition didn't strike the intended tone". On February 8, 2026, the American musician and singer Charlie Puth did a performance of the song during the Super Bowl LX in 2026, with many music critics believing that Puth nailed the performance.

In March 2005, a government-sponsored program, the National Anthem Project, was launched after a Harris Interactive poll showed many adults knew neither the lyrics nor the history of the anthem.

== Lyrics ==
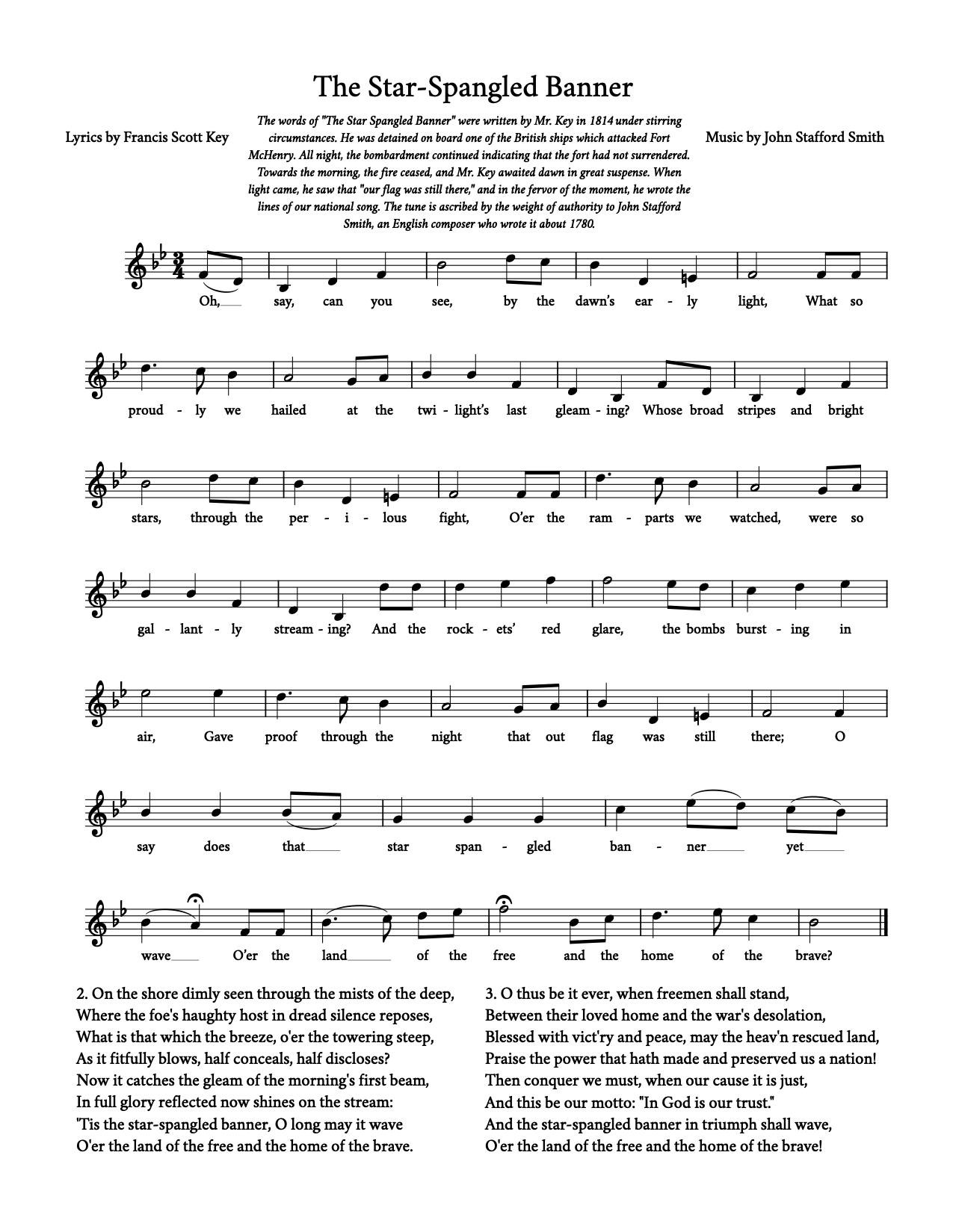
Sheet music

"The Star-Spangled Banner" has four verses, although only the first verse is commonly performed.

O say, can you see, by the dawn's early light,
What so proudly we hailed at the twilight's last gleaming?
Whose broad stripes and bright stars through the perilous fight,
O'er the ramparts we watched, were so gallantly streaming?
And the rockets' red glare, the bombs bursting in air,
Gave proof through the night that our flag was still there;
O say does that star-spangled banner yet wave,
O'er the land of the free and the home of the brave?

On the shore dimly seen through the mists of the deep,
Where the foe's haughty host in dread silence reposes,
What is that which the breeze, o'er the towering steep,
As it fitfully blows, half conceals, half discloses?
Now it catches the gleam of the morning's first beam,
In full glory reflected now shines on the stream:
'Tis the star-spangled banner, O long may it wave
O'er the land of the free and the home of the brave.

And where is that band who so vauntingly swore
That the havoc of war and the battle's confusion,
A home and a country should leave us no more?
Their blood has washed out their foul footsteps' pollution.
No refuge could save the hireling and slave,
From the terror of flight, or the gloom of the grave:
And the star-spangled banner in triumph doth wave,
O'er the land of the free and the home of the brave.

O thus be it ever, when freemen shall stand,
Between their loved home and the war's desolation,
Blessed with vict'ry and peace, may the heav'n rescued land,
Praise the power that hath made and preserved us a nation!
Then conquer we must, when our cause it is just,
And this be our motto: "In God is our trust."
And the star-spangled banner in triumph shall wave,
O'er the land of the free and the home of the brave!

Alternative lyrics

In a version hand-written by Francis Scott Key in 1840, the third line reads: "Whose bright stars and broad stripes, through the clouds of the fight".

Fifth stanza

In 1861, poet Oliver Wendell Holmes Sr. penned an unofficial fifth verse during the beginning of the American Civil War, looking hopefully at the emancipation of slaves.

When our land is illumed with Liberty's smile,
If a foe from within strikes a blow at her glory,
Down, down with the traitor who dares to defile
The flag of her stars and the page of her story!
By the millions unchained when our birthright was gained,
We will keep her bright blazon forever unstained!
And the star-spangled banner in triumph shall wave
While the land of the free is the home of the brave!

== Customs and federal law ==
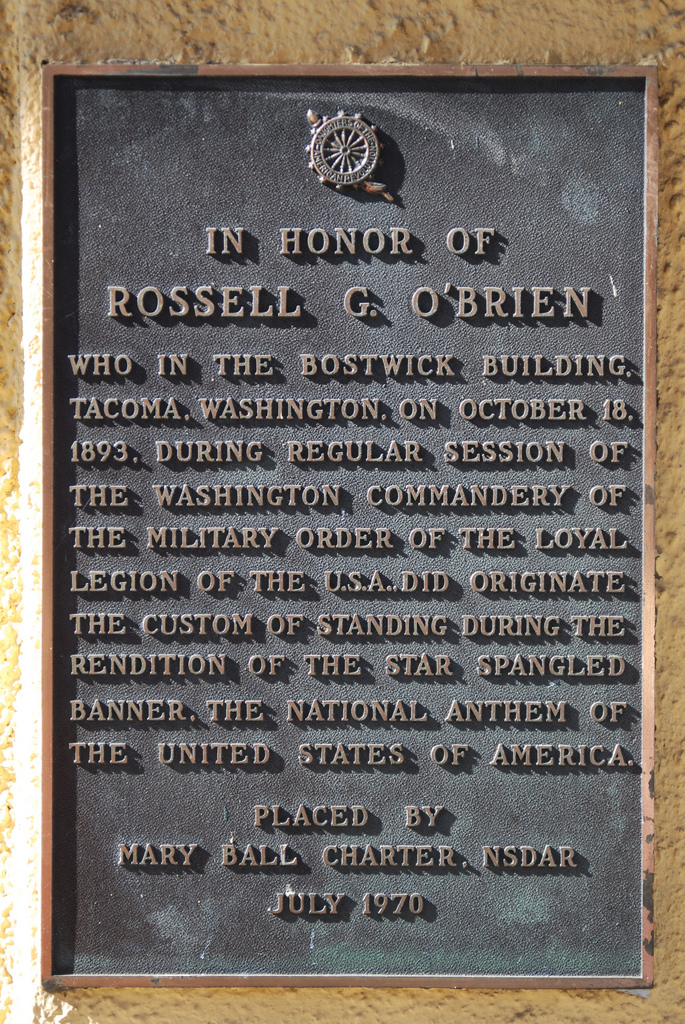
A plaque in Tacoma, Washington, detailing the history and custom of standing during the U.S. national anthem

When the U.S. national anthem was first recognized by law in 1931, there was no prescription as to behavior during its playing. On June 22, 1942, the law was revised indicating that those in uniform should salute during its playing, while others should simply stand at attention, men removing their hats. The same code also required that women should place their hands over their hearts when the flag is displayed during the playing of the national anthem, but not if the flag was not present. On December 23, 1942, the law was again revised instructing men and women to stand at attention and face in the direction of the music when it was played. That revision also directed men and women to place their hands over their hearts only if the flag was displayed. Those in uniform were required to salute. On July 7, 1976, the law was simplified. Men and women were instructed to stand with their hands over their hearts, men removing their hats, irrespective of whether or not the flag was displayed and those in uniform saluting. On August 12, 1998, the law was rewritten keeping the same instructions, but differentiating between "those in uniform" and "members of the Armed Forces and veterans" who were both instructed to salute during the playing whether or not the flag was displayed. Because of the changes in law over the years and confusion between instructions for the Pledge of Allegiance versus the national anthem, throughout most of the 20th century many people simply stood at attention or with their hands folded in front of them during the playing of the anthem, and when reciting the Pledge they would hold their hand (or hat) over their heart.

Since 1998, federal law (viz., the United States Code 36 U.S.C. § 301) states that during a rendition of the national anthem, when the flag is displayed, all present including those in uniform should stand at attention; non-military service individuals should face the flag with the right hand over the heart; members of the Armed Forces and veterans who are present and not in uniform may render the military salute; military service persons not in uniform should remove their headdress with their right hand and hold the headdress at the left shoulder, the hand being over the heart; and members of the Armed Forces and veterans who are in uniform should give the military salute at the first note of the anthem and maintain that position until the last note. The law further provides that when the flag is not displayed, all present should face toward the music and act in the same manner they would if the flag were displayed. Military law requires all vehicles on the installation to stop when the song is played and all individuals outside to stand at attention and face the direction of the music and either salute, in uniform, or place the right hand over the heart, if out of uniform. The law was amended in 2008, and since allows military veterans to salute out of uniform, as well.

The text of 36 U.S.C. § 301 is suggestive and not regulatory in nature. Failure to follow the suggestions is not a violation of the law. This behavioral requirement for the national anthem is subject to the same First Amendment controversies that surround the Pledge of Allegiance. For example, Jehovah's Witnesses do not sing the national anthem, though they are taught that standing is an "ethical decision" that individual believers must make based on their conscience.

== Translations ==
As a result of immigration to the United States by many non-English-speaking peoples, the lyrics of America's national anthem have seen multiple literary translations into immigrant languages. In 1861, very likely to help encourage German-American military service in the Union Army and the United States Navy during the American Civil War, the lyrics were translated into the German language in the United States and widely circulated. The Library of Congress also has record of a Spanish-language version from 1919. It has since been translated into Hebrew and Yiddish by Jewish immigrants, Latin American Spanish (with one version popularized during immigration reform protests in 2006), Louisiana French by the Cajun people, Irish, and Scottish Gaelic. The third verse of the anthem has also been translated into Latin.

With regard to the indigenous languages of North America and U.S. possessions in Polynesia, there are further translations into Navajo Cherokee, and Samoan.

== Protests ==
=== 1968 Olympics Black Power salute ===
The 1968 Olympics Black Power salute was a political demonstration conducted by African-American athletes Tommie Smith and John Carlos during their medal ceremony at the 1968 Summer Olympics in the Olympic Stadium in Mexico City. After having won gold and bronze medals respectively in the 200-meter running event, they turned on the podium to face their flags, and to hear the American national anthem, "The Star-Spangled Banner". Each athlete raised a black-gloved fist, and kept them raised until the anthem had finished. In addition, Smith, Carlos, and Australian silver medalist Peter Norman all wore human rights badges on their jackets. In his autobiography, Silent Gesture, Smith stated that the gesture was not a "Black Power" salute, but a "human rights salute". The event is regarded as one of the most overtly political statements in the history of the modern Olympic Games.

=== Protests against racism and police brutality (2016–present) ===
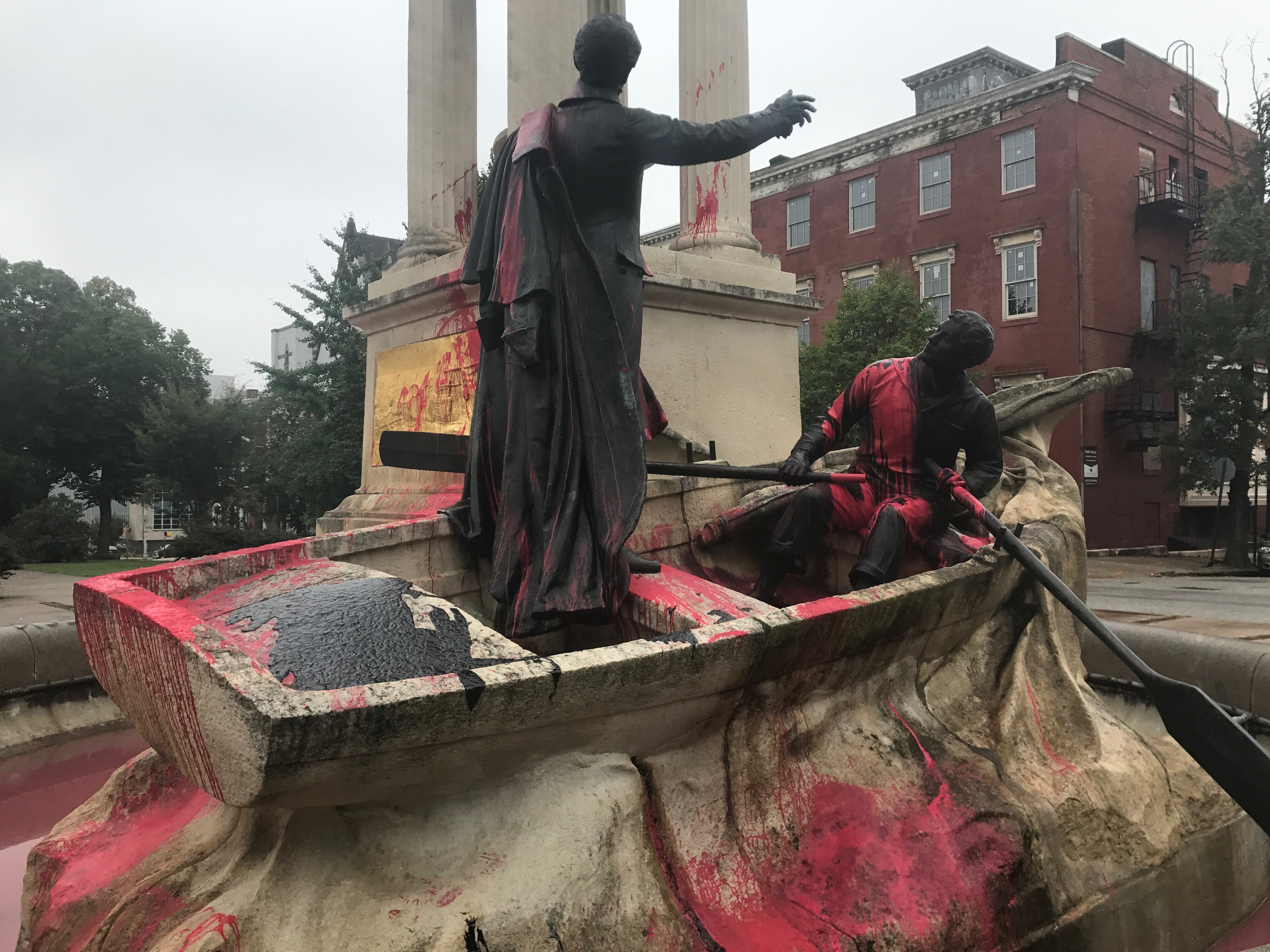
The defaced Francis Scott Key Monument in Baltimore when the statue was covered in red paint and the words "Racist Anthem" in 2017

Protests against police brutality and racism by kneeling on one knee during the national anthem began in the National Football League after San Francisco 49ers quarterback Colin Kaepernick knelt during the anthem, as opposed to the tradition of standing, in response to police brutality in the United States, before his team's third preseason game of 2016. Kaepernick sat during the first two preseason games, but he went unnoticed. In particular, protests focus on the discussion of slavery (and mercenaries) in the third verse of the anthem, in which some have interpreted the lyrics as condemning slaves that had joined the British in an effort to earn their freedom. Since Kaepernick's protest, other athletes have joined in the protests. In the 2017 season, after President Donald Trump's condemnation of the kneeling, which included calling for players (whom he reportedly also referred to by various profanities) to be fired, many NFL players responded by protesting during the national anthem that week. After the murder of George Floyd and killing of Breonna Taylor by police officers, when the 2019-2020 NBA season resumed play in July 2020 during the COVID-19 pandemic, the majority of players and coaches kneeled during the national anthem through the end of the season. In San Francisco, the statue of Francis Scott Key—the nation's first memorial to the anthem's lyricist Key, a slaveowner—was toppled by protestors on June 19, 2020. In June 2021, it was replaced by 350 black steel sculptures honoring the first 350 Africans kidnapped and forced onto a slave ship headed across the Atlantic from Angola in 1619. The sculptures stood until early 2024.

=== California chapter of the NAACP call to remove the national anthem ===
In November 2017, the California Chapter of the NAACP called on Congress to remove "The Star-Spangled Banner" as the national anthem. Alice Huffman, California NAACP president, said: "It's racist; it doesn't represent our community, it's anti-black." The rarely-sung third stanza of the anthem contains the words "No refuge could save the hireling and slave, from the terror of flight, or the gloom of the grave", which some interpret as racist. The organization was still seeking a representative to sponsor the legislation in Congress at the time of its announcement.

== Media ==
The Star-Spangled Banner (1915)
1915 recording of the Star-Spangled Banner as sung by Margaret Woodrow Wilson, daughter of Woodrow Wilson

The Star-Spangled Banner (1942)
Fred Waring and His Pennsylvanians sing The Star-Spangled Banner in 1942

The Star-Spangled Banner (1953)
1953 instrumental recording by the United States Marine Corps band

The Star Spangled Banner (circa 2000)
Instrumental recording by the United States Navy Band

"The Star-Spangled Banner" (1918 arrangement by J.S. Sousa and W.J. Damrosch)
John Philip Sousa and Walter Damrosch's 1918 arrangement of the "The Star-Spangled Banner" being performed by the United States Military Academy Band in 2000.

1940

Lady Gaga performs "The Star-Spangled Banner" at the inauguration of Joe Biden in January 2021

1944

== See also ==
- "America the Beautiful"
- "God Bless America"
- "Hail, Columbia"
- In God We Trust
- "Lift Every Voice and Sing", often dubbed the "Black National Anthem"
- "My Country, 'Tis of Thee"
