= Portland Lesbian Choir =

Lesbian choir based in Portland, Oregon, U.S.

- Choir
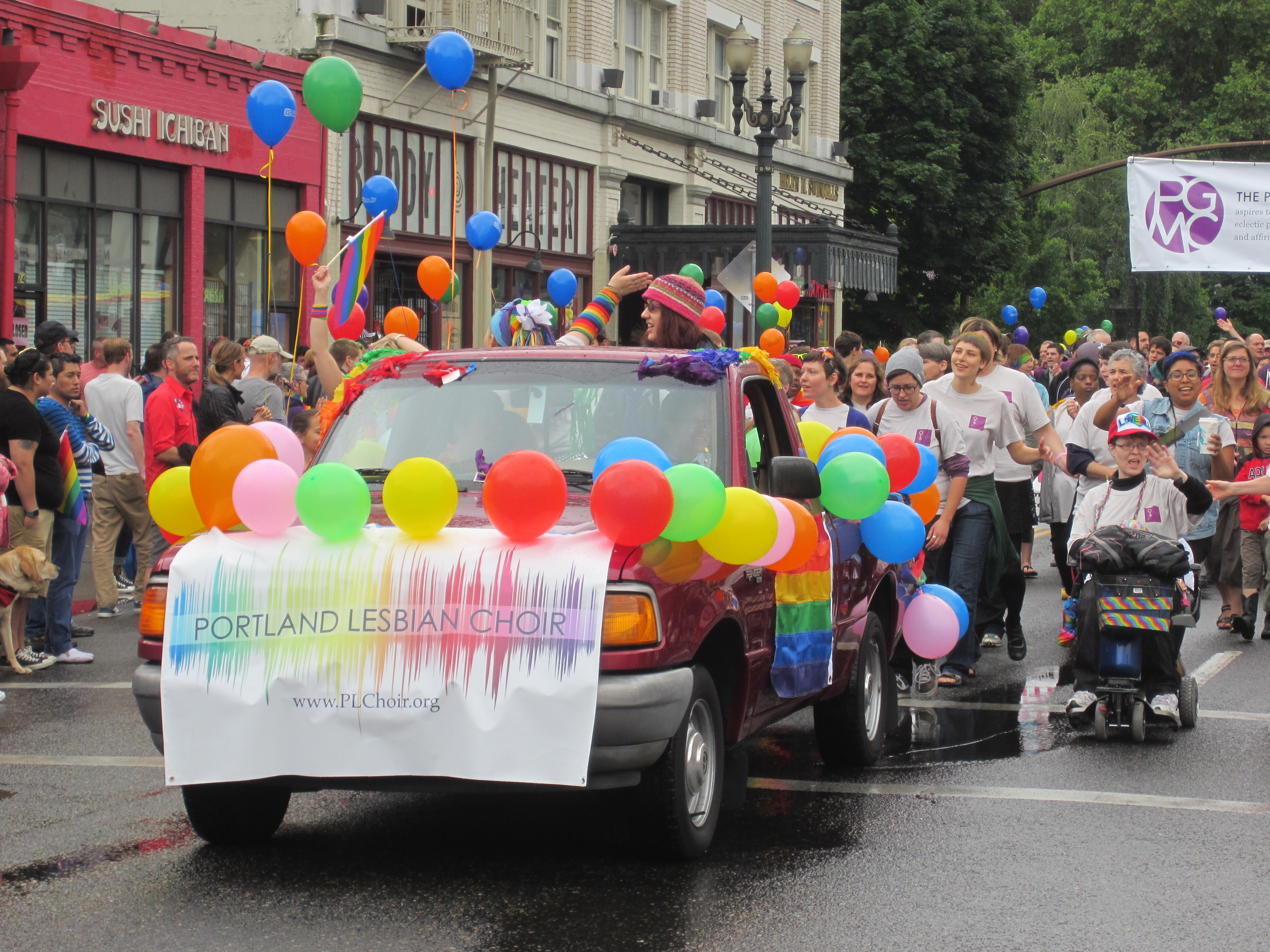
- Portland Lesbian Choir representation in Portland, Oregon's annual pride parade, 2014
- Origin: Portland, Oregon
- Founded: 1986; 40 years ago
- Website: www.plchoir.org

The Portland Lesbian Choir (PLC) is a LGBTQ choir based in Portland, Oregon, in the United States. The group formed in 1986. The choir has an inclusive, "non-audition" policy that applies to "women of all ages, races, gender and sexual orientations (including straight allies), abilities, creeds, lifestyles, etc." PLC is a member of the association of GALA Choruses, alongside its local counterpart, the Portland Gay Men's Chorus.

In 2016, PLC presented The Miles Fly By at Revolution Hall in celebration of its thirtieth anniversary.

== Discography ==
- Making Light (1997)

== See also ==
- Culture of Portland, Oregon
- LGBTQ culture in Portland, Oregon
- Portland Gay Men's Chorus
