= Joseph Carr (music publisher) =

Joseph Carr (London, 1739 – Baltimore, Maryland, October 20, 1819) was an American music publisher. He was the father of Thomas Carr and Benjamin Carr, and was one of the most influential publishers in the early history of the United States.

== Biography ==
Born in London and descended from a long line of publisher-merchants, he was a skilled engraver. He kept a retail shop in Holborn from about 1770 until he immigrated to Baltimore in February 1794, where he established a similar business.

He formed a business partnership with his son Benjamin, and together they dominated the American music publishing industry until about 1800.

== Publications ==
The Carrs published stage works, vocal music, keyboard pieces, and instrumental music. While much of the music was originally from Europe, especially the British Isles, there were also many published works by important early American composers, such as Alexander Reinagle and James Hewitt.

Much of their music was printed in serial format, such as the multiple-volume Musical Journal for the Piano Forte (1800–04), at the time the largest collection of secular music issued in America.

On his death, Carr bequeathed the firm's holdings, which included over 2000 plates, to his younger son Thomas.
