= Cristina Spinei =

American composer (born 1984)

Cristina Spinei (born February 29, 1984) is a Nashville-based American composer. She is best known for her work with ballet; she has been commissioned by the Nashville ballet, the New York Choreographic Institute, and the Pacific Northwest Ballet.

== Biography ==
Cristina Spinei was born in Connecticut and started playing piano by the age of 9. She graduated with bachelor's and master's degrees from the Juilliard School where she studied with Christopher Rouse. She has been called "one of the most talented young composers in America" by Grammy award-winning composer/conductor José Serebrier. Spinei is recipient of the Connecticut Commission on Culture and Tourism Grant for Composition, the Composer Assistance Award from the American Music Center, the Foundation for Contemporary Arts composition grant, the New York State Council on the Arts composition grant, and the Composition Award from the Arts Recognition and Talent Search.

Spinei's ballets and other compositions have been performed throughout the United States and internationally. She also Performs her own music, most notably with the Nashville Ballet in 2017, 2018, and 2020.

She is co-founder of Blind Ear Music, a New York-based group that combines new music with cutting-edge technology. Blind Ear has been featured at the World Technology Awards and on YouTube's weekly "Spotlight on Music" section. Blind Ear was cited as "the future of music" in an interview for the BBC World Service's The World Today.

Spinei's first album, Music for Dance (Toccata Classics), made its debut in 2016. The album was characterized by the critic Dean Frey as having a "strong lyrical streak with an open, folk-like feeling and a dollop of pop".

Spinei's most recent project is her second full-length album, Ex Voto. In February 2020, she performed pieces from the album new music venue National Sawdust in Brooklyn.

In addition to her own records, Spinei's music appears on the debut album of Trio Celeste, as well as on St. Michel Strings' album Adagio, a record nominated for a Latin Grammy Award.

== Recent works ==
- Music for Dance (Toccata Classics) (2016)
- Ex Voto (2020)
