= Anna Crusis Women's Choir =

Feminist choir in the United States

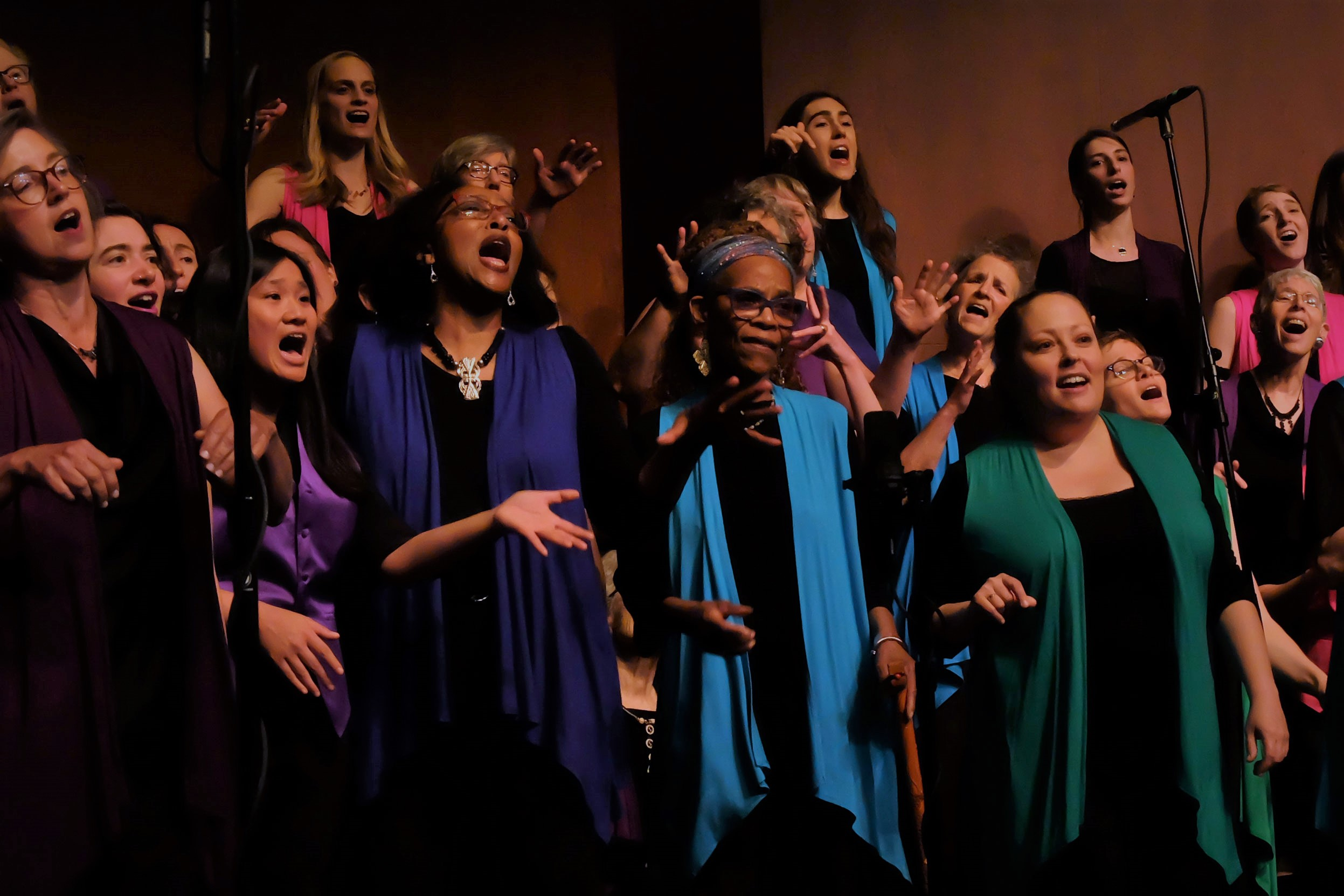
Anna Crusis Feminist Choir, "Beyond Boundaries, December, 2017

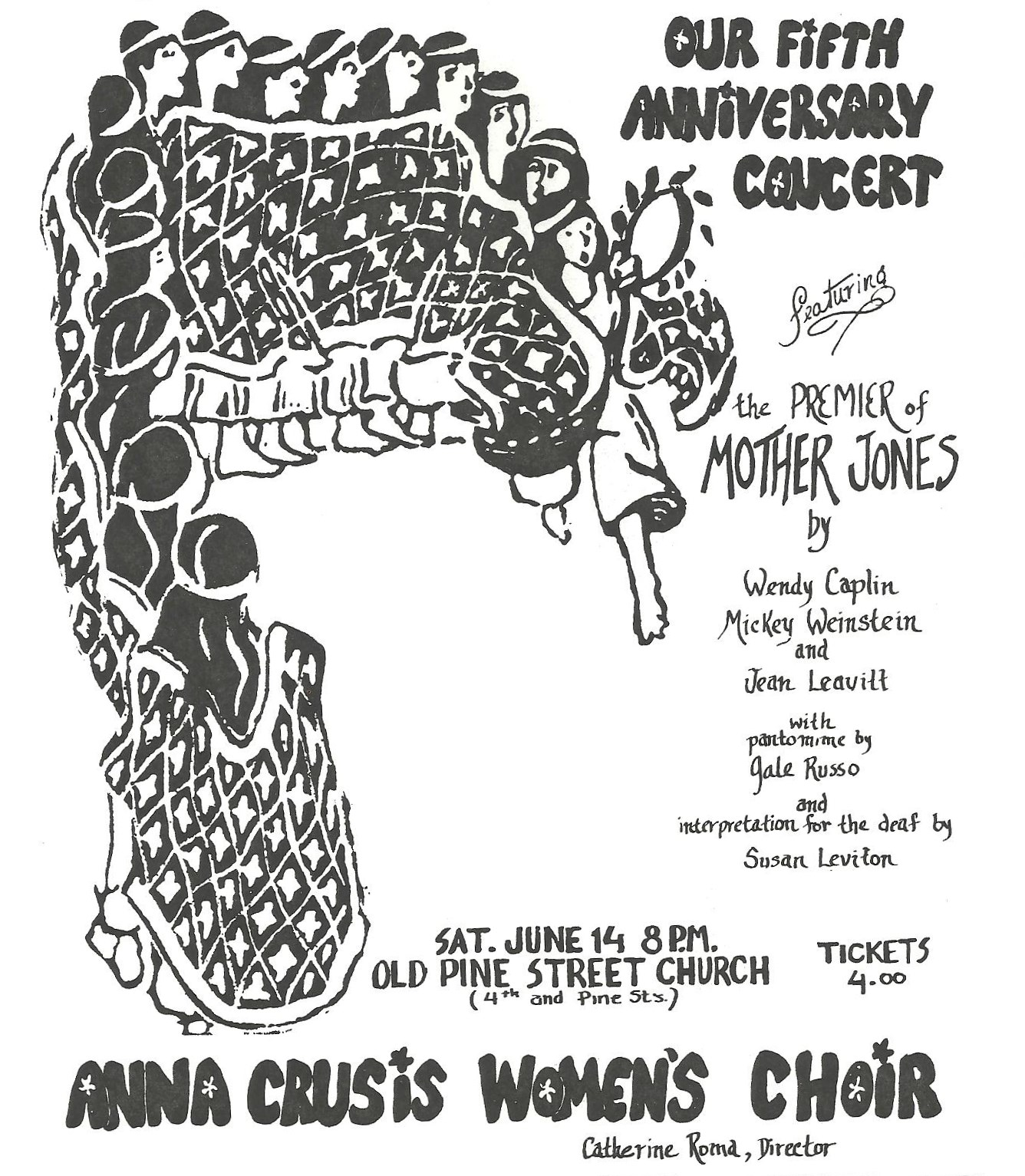
Anna Crusis Women's Choir, poster by Gale B. Russo for June 14, 1980 Concert

The ANNA Crusis Feminist Choir is the longest-running feminist choir in the United States, founded in 1975 by Catherine Roma, in Philadelphia, Pennsylvania.

== History ==
Catherine Roma formed the Anna Crusis Women's Choir in 1975 after moving to Philadelphia to teach music at Abington Friends School. She was its artistic director from 1975 to 1983. Under her leadership, the choir often made decisions through a process similar to Quaker consensus, in which all members had a voice.

ANNA Crusis has an educational and social focus. It has supported LGBTQ+ issues and has performed with other groups at events such as International Women's Day and Philly Pride. The choir traditionally includes a sign language interpreter at its concerts.

Jane Hulting was musical director of the choir from 1983 to 2005. Hulting took a sabbatical year in 2003 during which Jacqueline Coren was interim director. She took over upon Hulting's departure in 2005, acting as musical director until 2011. Miriam Davidson became director in 2012.

Anna Crusis changed its name from Anna Crusis Women's Choir to Anna Crusis Feminist Choir to create a more welcoming environment for the nonbinary and transgender community. Language changes were made to reflect a more diverse and gender-expansive membership while honoring their history and feminist roots.

== Awards Received ==
- 1988, Women's International League for Peace and Freedom local awards; main awards to poet Sonia Sanchez and singer-songwriter Holly Near.
- 2014, National Endowment for the Arts Award, jointly to The Philadelphia Singers, Sister Singers GirlChoir, and Anna Crusis Women's Choir, to fund "Women Aloud: Celebrating Women in Music" concert, March 2016.
