= Emil J. Oberhoffer House =

Historic house in Minnesota, United States

- U.S. National Register of Historic Places
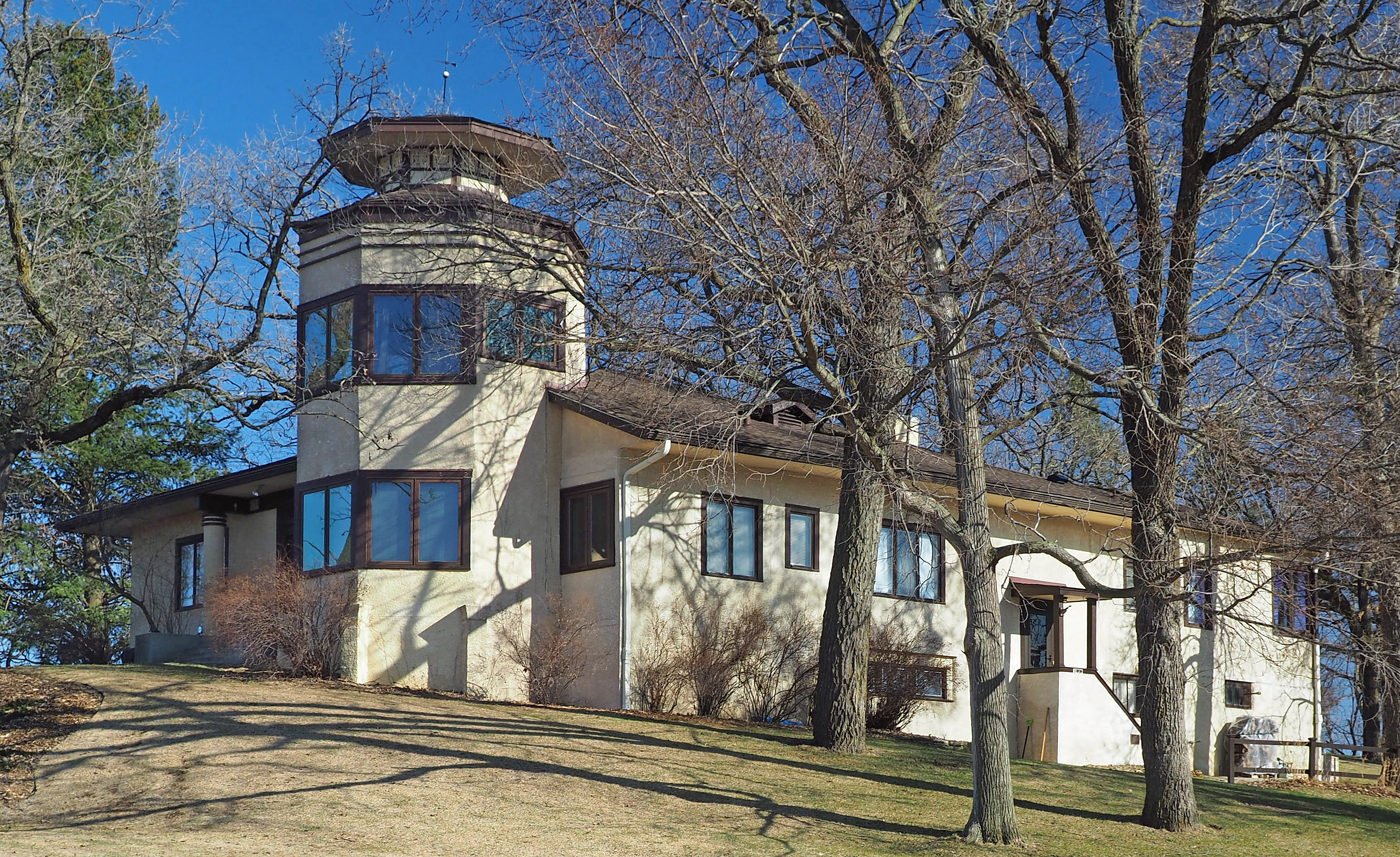
- The Emil J. Oberhoffer House viewed from the northwest

- Location within Minnesota Location within the United States
- Location: 17020 Judicial Road West, Lakeville, Minnesota
- Coordinates: 44°42′10″N 93°19′1″W
- Built: 1914
- Architect: Paul Haugen & Newstrom
- Architectural style: Prairie School
- NRHP reference No.: 79001232
- Added to NRHP: December 31, 1979

The Emil J. Oberhoffer House is a historic house in Lakeville, Minnesota, United States, overlooking Orchard Lake. Emil Oberhoffer was the founder and first conductor of the Minneapolis Symphony Orchestra. The home was designed by Paul Haugen, who worked for Purcell and Elmslie, an architectural firm known for its renditions of Prairie School architecture. Later the home belonged to the parents of golfer Patty Berg.

Architect Paul Haugen began his architectural career as an apprentice in Fargo, North Dakota. After moving to Minneapolis, he was influenced by the Prairie School style of architecture and ornamentation. This home was designed while he was on his own for a brief period of time around 1913. During that time he designed several residences and a school in Burnsville.
