= Men's chorus =

Type of vocal group

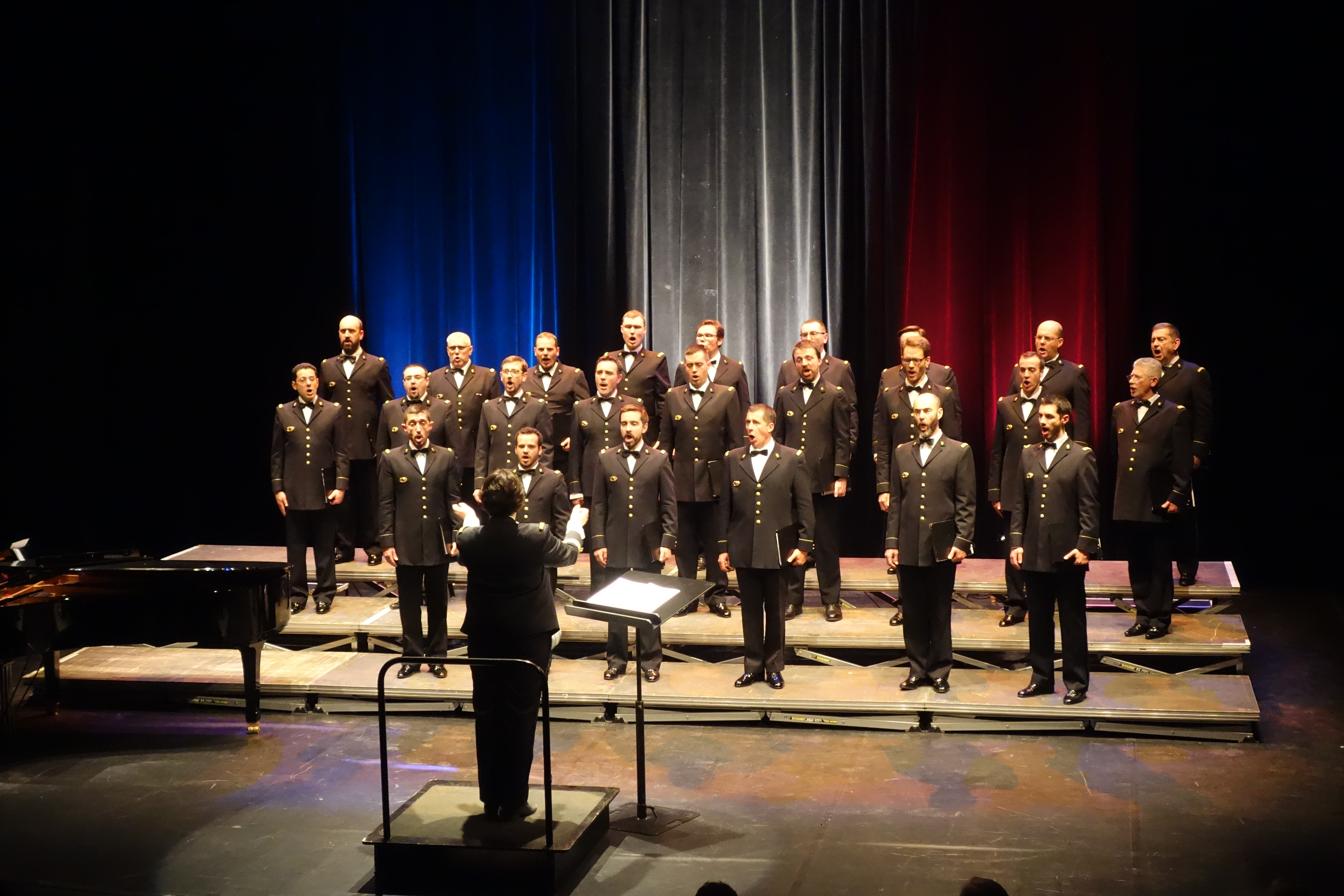
The Choir of the French Army at the Lons-le-Saunier Theater.

A men's chorus or male voice choir (MVC) (German: Männerchor), is a choir consisting of men who sing with either a tenor or bass voice, and whose music is typically arranged into high and low tenors (1st and 2nd tenor), and high and low basses (1st and 2nd bass; or baritone and bass)—and shortened to the letters TTBB. The term can also refer to a piece of music which is performed by such a choir.

== Overview ==
Male voice choirs are commonly found in the United Kingdom, particularly in Wales, Cornwall, and Yorkshire. The names of male voice choirs sometimes use the abbreviation MVC, for example Castleford MVC.

Men have sung together throughout history. In the West, most music lovers will be familiar with monastic chanting such as the Gregorian chant.

In addition, men have come together to make music and enjoy the fellowship of others with a similar passion. Glee clubs became popular in the United States where men would sing in harmony, usually a cappella. Russia has a long tradition of men singing in the Russian Orthodox Church. Elsewhere in the world, such as in Wales, parts of the US and Europe, male choirs arose from the late 19th century through to present times. There are also a number of gay men's choruses, most prevalent in the United States.

Male choirs (1st tenor, 2nd tenor, baritone and bass) even without trebles or boy sopranos have a slight advantage over women's choirs in that 1st tenors singing in the falsetto range of their voice can extend the range to encompass all of the range available to a female choir. However, even the lowest female voices cannot extend into the bass range of a men's choir or chorus. Some of the most well-known male choruses are those in Wales, but there are highly skilled choirs around the world. Most male choruses today sing a wide range of music, including the traditional Welsh hymns but also choruses from opera, musical comedy and the popular genre.

An offshoot of the male chorus is the barbershop genre. Barbershop singing uses unique and specialised arrangements and is nearly always unaccompanied.

Many of the modern Germany male choruses owe their origins to the Liedertafel groups which were very popular in the 19th and early 20th centuries, with some groups still singing.

== Männerchöre in Germany ==
Male voice choirs were an innovation of the 19th century. Traditional values, with an increasingly patriotic stance and coupled with the social pleasures of a circle of friends stood at the centre of the movement. Older folk songs found new popularity in the first half of the 19th century (Romantic Age). A cappella four-voice male voice choirs supplemented the established choral forms of a mix of male, female and children's voices. National musical education was supposed to be promoted along with the political and social Enlightenment. Carl Friedrich Zelter (1758–1832) and above all Friedrich Silcher (1789–1860) were instrumental in influencing the development of a choral life, where choirs took root with a constitution, committee and–in the full flush of enthusiasm–showed all the "bells and whistles" of an organisation. In Switzerland, Hans Georg Nägeli continued this movement.

The choirs often gave themselves evocative names. If an enthusiast had spent a few days at the "golden Rhine", he would feel called on to found a choir on the River Weser with a name such as "Lorelei" or "Stolzenfels". Hoarse male voices called themselves "Harmony" or named their organisation "Concordia", or "The Warbling Nightingale". Such vocal enthusiasm was often bound with patriotism and love of nature. The life of such a club and the joy of singing in harmony was supposed to be especially helpful in diverting attention from a hard day's work. The musical content, after the initially more political forays, was accordingly: homeland, German forests, songs about the fruit of the grape, and of course – love. Areas which overflow with tourists today were once serenaded as quiet, romantic spots, in songs such as : ("In der Drosselgass“), "Zu Rüdesheim" and "Vater Rhein". In such songs, one would roam as a musician ("Spielmann") or hunter ("Jäger") through the country, and one felt oneself to be as free as a gypsy.

After the Second World War, the survivors found themselves back in their choirs, at first with new members, but the more the dreams of travel and romantic interludes could be actually realised with increasing wealth, the less the members had to seek the experiences about which they sang in thoughts alone. Thus began a gradual decline as the members of the great choirs aged and died and no new members replaced them. Despite this decline, there were still about 9641 male voice choirs in Germany around the year 2002–about 15.9% of all choral forms.

== List of male voice choirs ==
Notable male voice choirs include:

- The Academic Male Voice Choir of Helsinki
- Apollo Club of Minneapolis
- Australian Welsh Male Choir
- BYU Men's Chorus
- Cardiff Arms Park Male Choir
- Castleford Male Voice Choir
- Chanticleer
- Choir of the French Army
- Chor Leoni Men's Choir
- City of Bath Male Choir
- Côr Godre'r Aran
- Cornell University Glee Club
- Felling Male Voice Choir
- Froncysyllte Male Voice Choir
- Hartlepool Male Voice Choir
- Harvard Glee Club
- Holman Climax Male Voice Choir
- Hombourg-Haut Male Voice Choir
- Kenyan Boys Choir
- Leeds Male Voice Choir
- Linköping University Male Voice Choir
- Lund University Male Voice Choir
- Morriston Orpheus Choir
- Norwegian Student Choral Society
- Ohio State University Men's Glee Club
- Orphei Drängar
- Orpheus Male Voice Choir, Grimsby & Cleethorpes
- The Polytech Choir
- Pontarddulais Male Choir
- Svanholm Singers
- Treorchy Male Choir
- University of Michigan Men's Glee Club
- Wessex Male Choir
- Wiener Schubertbund
- YL Male Voice Choir
- many gay men's choruses

== See also ==
- Music of Wales
