= Trinity Methodist Church, Castleford =

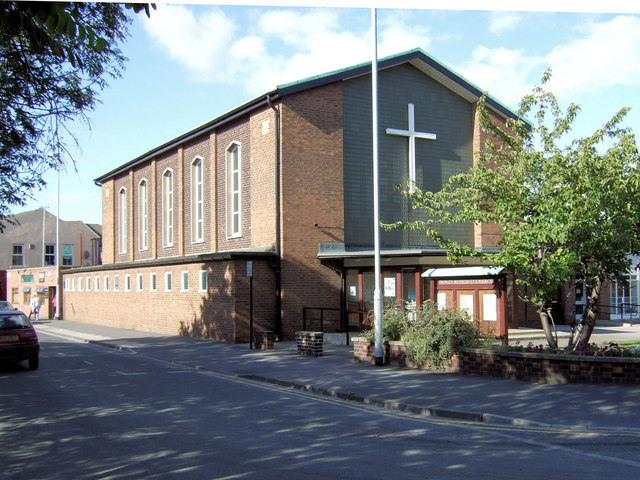
- Trinity Methodist Church, Powell Street, Castleford
- Trinity Methodist Church, Castleford
- 53.725101°N 1.354564°W
- OS grid reference: SE 42684 25608
- Location: Castleford, Wakefield District, West Yorkshire
- Country: England
- Denomination: Methodist
- Website: www.trinitymethodistcastleford.org.uk

History
- Dedicated: 1964

Architecture
- Architect: Colin J. Horsfall
- Architectural type: Brick-built
- Completed: 1964

Specifications
- Capacity: c.250 people

Administration
- Province: Leeds District
- Parish: Aire & Calder Methodist Circuit

Trinity Methodist Church, Castleford, is in Castleford, Wakefield District, West Yorkshire, England.

The church is part of the Aire and Calder Methodist Circuit in the Yorkshire West District.

The current Johannus Sweelinck 30 3-manual digital organ was installed in the church in 2000. The original organ was built by Nelson & Co., based in Durham.

The church has been re-roofed. The Castleford Male Voice Choir meets in the church hall next to the church on a weekly basis.
