= Wessex Male Choir =

Male choir from Wiltshire, England

The Wessex Male Choir ('The Wessex') is an amateur men's chorus based in Swindon, Wiltshire, UK.

The choir takes its name from the ancient kingdom of Wessex, an area of land approximating to that of the modern English counties of Hampshire, Dorset, Wiltshire, and Somerset. This is reflected in the choir's logo, which features a wyvern - the two-legged dragon used in the flag of Wessex.

The choir was founded in September 2001 by Robert T. Elliott.

The choir typically performs seven or eight concerts each year, two of these being "home" concerts in Swindon at Christmas and in the summer, the others being in other venues around the country. The choir has sung pre-match at Six Nations and other Rugby and NFL matches on the pitch at Twickenham Stadium and Wembley Stadium to audiences of up to 80,000.

The Wessex also occasionally places in regional and international choral competitions.

- In 2011, the choir won first place in the Male Choir competition at the prestigious Llangollen International Musical Eisteddfod beating choirs from Wales, England, and the USA. In the same year, the Chamber choir took third place.
- In 2008, 2013, and 2016, the Wessex won the Gold Cup at the Cheltenham Festival for best choir in all competitions.
- In June 2019, the Wessex won two classes (including the Male Choir competition) at the Krakow International Choir Festival, Poland in 2019, beating choirs from across Europe.

Wessex Camerata is a chamber group composed of about 16 experienced singers who perform mainly a cappella pieces which supplement the main choir’s repertoire.

== Discography ==
- Men in Black (2005)
- Shades of Wessex (2008)
- It's Christmas (2011)
- Memory (2018)
