= Castleford Male Voice Choir =

Choir based in West Yorkshire, England

- Choir
- Also known as: Castleford MVC; CMVC
- Origin: Castleford, United Kingdom
- Founded: 1926 (100 years ago)
- Genre: Male voice choir
- Headquarters: Castleford/Pontefract, West Yorkshire
- Website: www.castlefordmvc.co.uk

The Castleford Male Voice Choir (CMVC) is a male voice choir based in Castleford, West Yorkshire, England. The choir was established in 1926.

The choir has recorded LPs. It has appeared on the BBC television programme The One Show. It has toured nationally and internationally, for example to Salzburg in Austria where it appeared with the Salzburg Singers. The choir undertakes joint concerts as well as appearing on its own.

The Castleford MVC meets weekly at the Trinity Methodist Church Hall in Castleford.

== Discography ==
Recordings include:

- Golden Jubilee (1975)
- Yorkshire Mixture (1978) – with the Queensbury Music Centre Band
- With A Voice Of Singing (2001)
