= Emil Oberhoffer =

Musical artist and Conductor

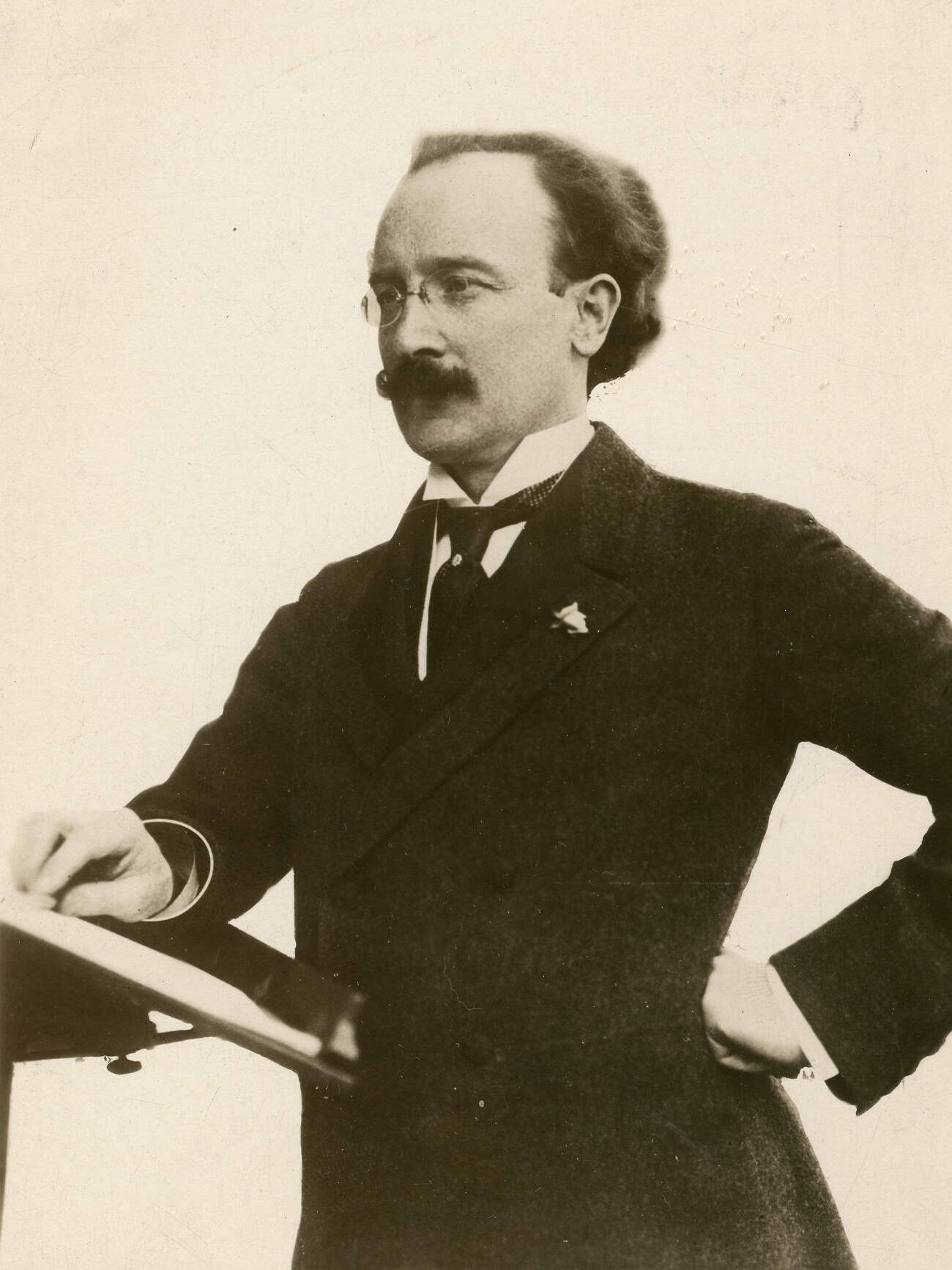
- Oberhoffer in 1916

Background information
- Born: 10 August 1867; Munich, Bavaria
- Died: 22 May 1933 (aged 65) San Diego, California, US
- Genre: Classical
- Occupations: Conductor, composer
- Formerly of: Minneapolis Symphony Orchestra

Emil Oberhoffer (10 August 1867 – 22 May 1933) was a German-born American conductor and minor composer. He founded the Minneapolis Symphony Orchestra (now known as the Minnesota Orchestra), and was its conductor for the first 19 years of its existence.

== Biography ==
Emil Johann Oberhoffer was born near Munich, Kingdom of Bavaria on 10 August 1867 to a musical family, his father being a well known organist, composer and provincial conductor, and his mother and siblings also making their marks. He showed early promise on the organ and violin, and was sent for training with the Josef Rheinberger disciple Cyrill Kistler, and later to Paris for intensive piano study with Isidor Philipp.

He emigrated to New York City in 1885, became an American citizen in 1893, and moved to St. Paul, Minnesota in 1897 as a teacher, lecturer, concert performer and conductor. He conducted the Apollo Club of Minneapolis, a notable choral society. He also organised the Schubert Choral Association and the Schubert Orchestra in St. Paul, and he was director of the Minneapolis Philharmonic Club, a choral group. He became frustrated at the quality of the scratch ensembles used for accompaniments for these groups, and this became the catalyst for the establishment a permanent orchestra in Minneapolis. The Minneapolis Symphony Orchestra gave its first performance, under Oberhoffer's direction, on 5 November 1903.

He was also organist and director of music at the Church of the Redeemer, and he founded the chair of music at the University of Minnesota. He was personally very active and energetic, and instigated a practice of touring the orchestra widely, making it better known than most of its metropolis-bound counterparts. The orchestra made its Carnegie Hall debut in 1912.

Oberhoffer left Minneapolis in 1922 after increasing friction with the orchestra's management. His place was taken by Bruno Walter as guest conductor for 1922–23, then by Henri Verbrugghen. His tenure of 19 years with the Minneapolis Symphony was not equalled until Stanisław Skrowaczewski (1960–79).

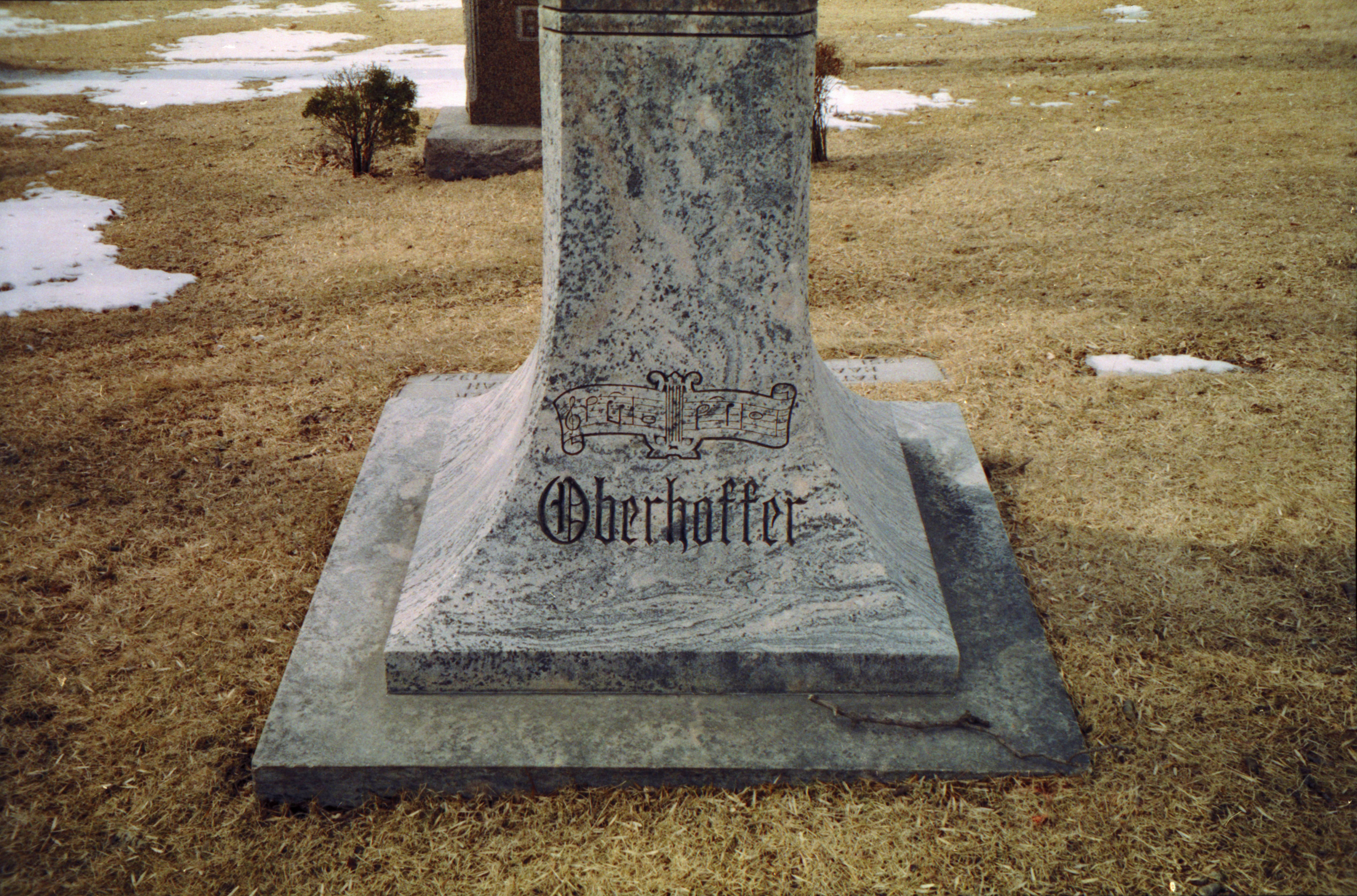
Gravestone

He moved to California, and became guest conductor with the Los Angeles Philharmonic, San Francisco Symphony, St. Louis Symphony Orchestra and Detroit Symphony Orchestra. On 8 July 1926, he conducted the first performance by the LA Philharmonic of Maurice Ravel's Alborada del gracioso.

His compositions include: Hora Novissima (a vocal scene about the last hours of a dying child at whose side his mother waits while a bell tolls), and Mélodie élégiaque, dedicated to the French violinist Camilla Urso.

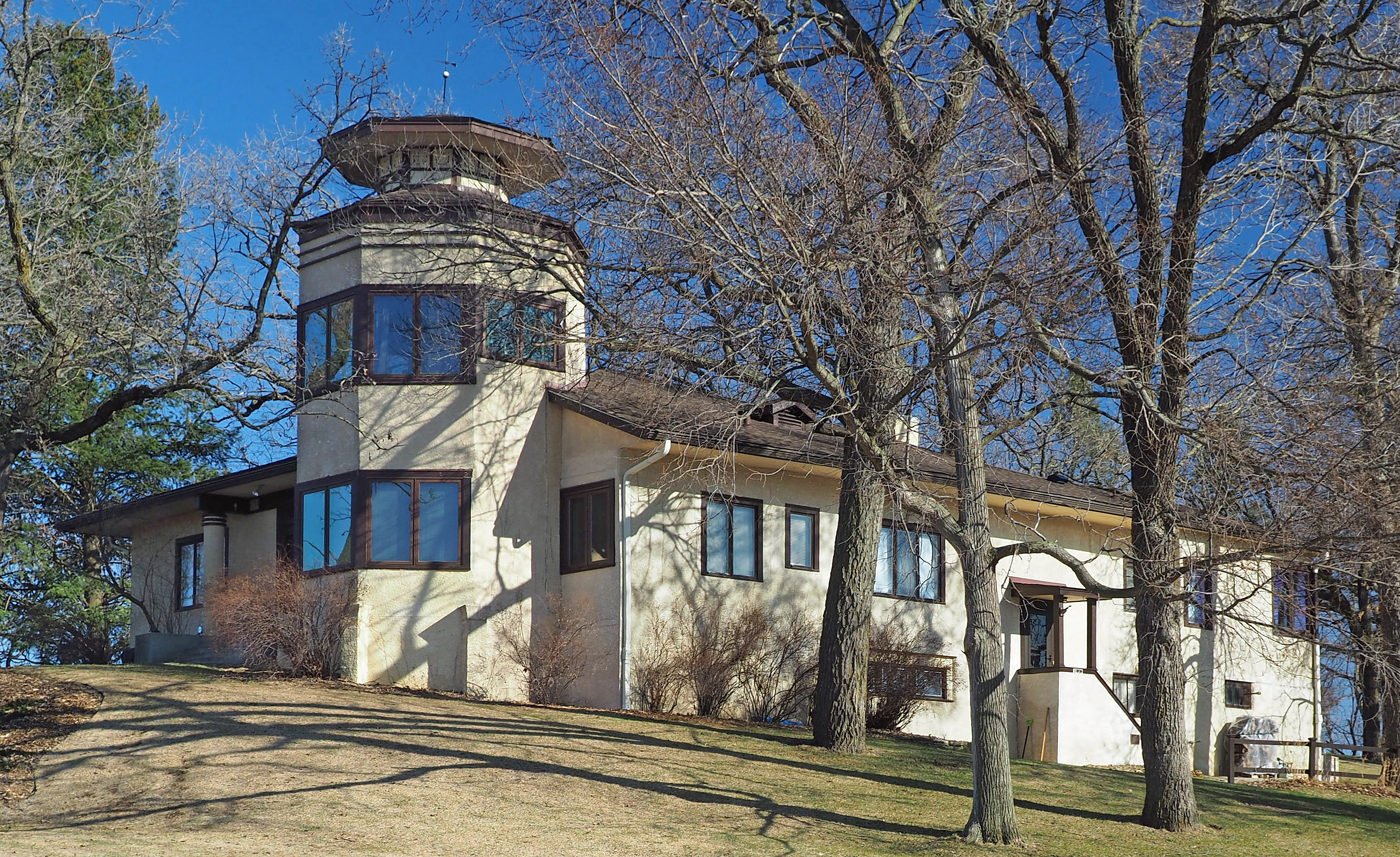
Emil J. Oberhoffer House

Emil Oberhoffer died in San Diego, California on 22 May 1933, aged 65. He is buried in the Lakewood Cemetery, Minneapolis, where the Oberhoffer Obelisk stands in his memory.

== Legacy ==
The Emil J. Oberhoffer House overlooks Orchard Lake in Lakeville, Minnesota.
