= Côr Godre'r Aran =

- Origin: Llanuwchllyn, Gwynedd, Wales
- Years active: 1949–present
- Labels: Sain
- Website: www.corgodreraran.org.uk

Côr Godre'r Aran (Welsh for 'Choir from the foothills of the Aran mountain') is a Welsh male-voice choir that from Llanuwchllyn, near Bala, North Wales. The choir has over forty members who are all natural Welsh speakers and represent a spectrum of rural occupations.

== History ==
The choir was formed in 1949 to compete at the National Eisteddfod of Wales in Dolgellau by the late Tom Jones. It was at that time a penillion singing or cerdd dant group of about 20 young men from the village of Llanuwchllyn. The choir soon gained a strong reputation as one of the chief exponents of this traditional Welsh genre.

The choir has travelled extensively since 1969 and has performed in the United States, New Zealand, Portugal, Hong Kong, Singapore, Argentina, Canada on three occasions, and Australia eight times. In 2007 they returned to the regions of Patagonia, Argentina for a three-week tour in November and to Switzerland. Other short tours have taken the choir to Spain, Switzerland, Ireland, Scotland and the Royal Albert Hall, London; Symphony Hall, Birmingham; The Sage, Gateshead; Brangwyn Hall, Swansea; and St David's Hall, Cardiff.

The choir's musical director is Eirian Owen, who has directed the choir since 1975. She was appointed accompanist of Côr Godre’r Aran in 1970 and subsequently succeeded Tom Jones as musical director. Over the years she has voluntarily devoted hours to the Choir and has been instrumental in developing and directing the choir to its success.

== Discography ==
The choir has recorded 12 times with Welsh record company Sain, including four CDs: Evviva, Cwlwm Aur, Byd o Heddwch and Cofio which was released on the choir's 60th anniversary in 2009.

== Awards ==
Over the years the choir has successfully competed at National and International levels winning the principal awards at the National Eisteddfod of Wales and the Llangollen International Eisteddfod. In 2005, the choir won the BBC Radio Cymru competition for Male Voice choirs.

The choir has been awarded several David Ellis Memorial Awards (Blue Ribbon) from the National Eisteddfod of Wales. Winners members of the choir including twice winner, the baritone Tom Evans (also known as Tom Gwanas).
