= Leeds Male Voice Choir =

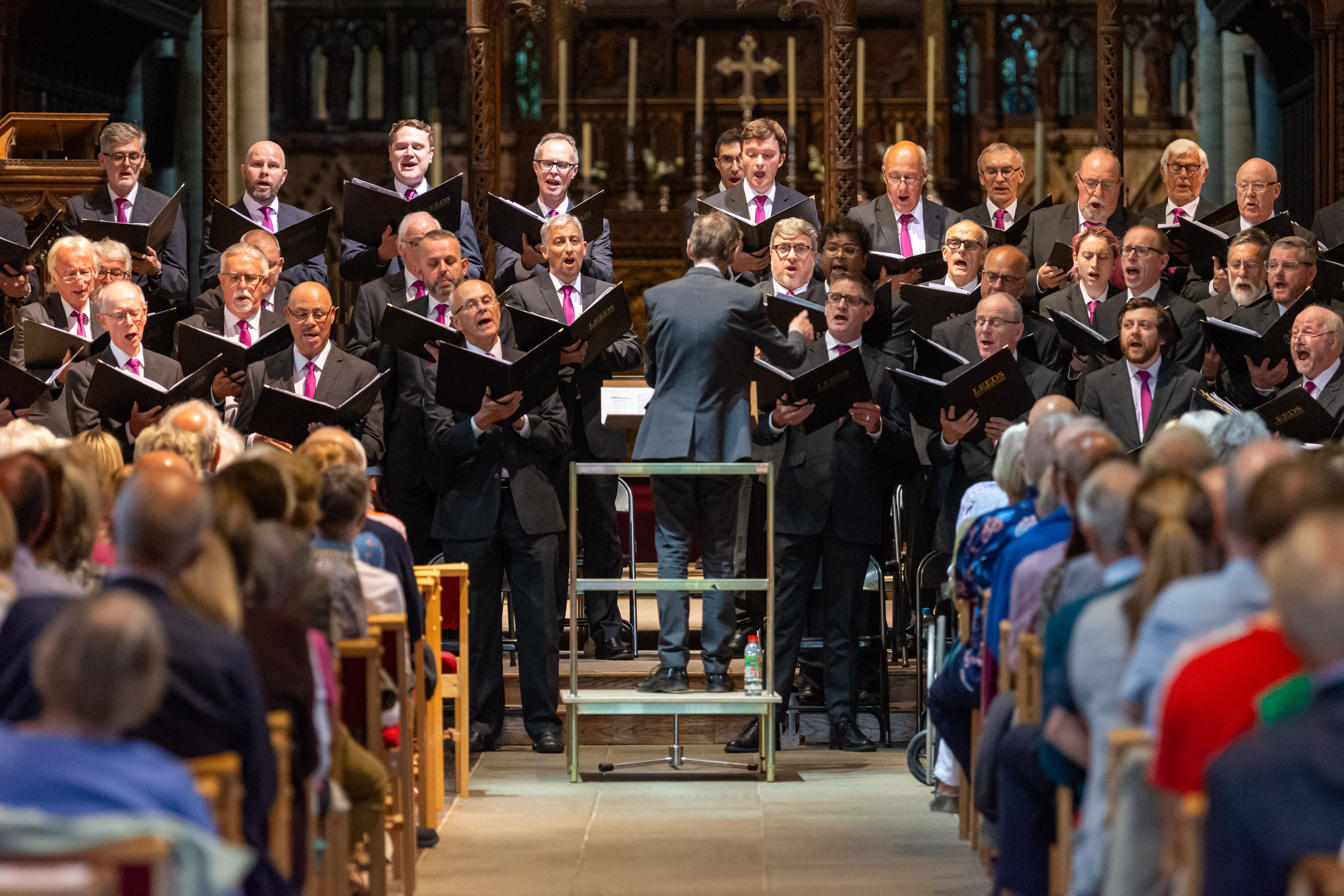
- Leeds Male Voice Choir in 2023

Background information
- Also known as: Broom Excelsior Vocal Union, Broom Excelsior Male Voice Choir, Broom Male Voice Choir
- Origin: Leeds, United Kingdom
- Genres: Classical, pop, folk, musicals, rock
- Years active: 1916 – present
- Website: http://www.leedsmalevoicechoir.co.uk

Leeds Male Voice Choir is a choir of men founded in 1916 in Leeds, West Yorkshire in the United Kingdom. Originally formed from mining workers in Middleton, Leeds, the choir now has around seventy singers who perform regularly throughout Leeds, Yorkshire and Europe. The choir offers free annual singing workshops as part of the choir's charitable aims.

== Early years: 1916–1953 ==
Formed by Thomas Crossland, the organist and choirmaster at Stourton Wesleyan Chapel, the choir took its name from Broom Pit in Middleton, Leeds and was known for a time as the Broom Excelsior Male Voice performing for the first time in Stourton in September 1916. John Hickes was the conductor until 1953, overseeing the name change to Leeds Male Voice Choir in the late 1940s.

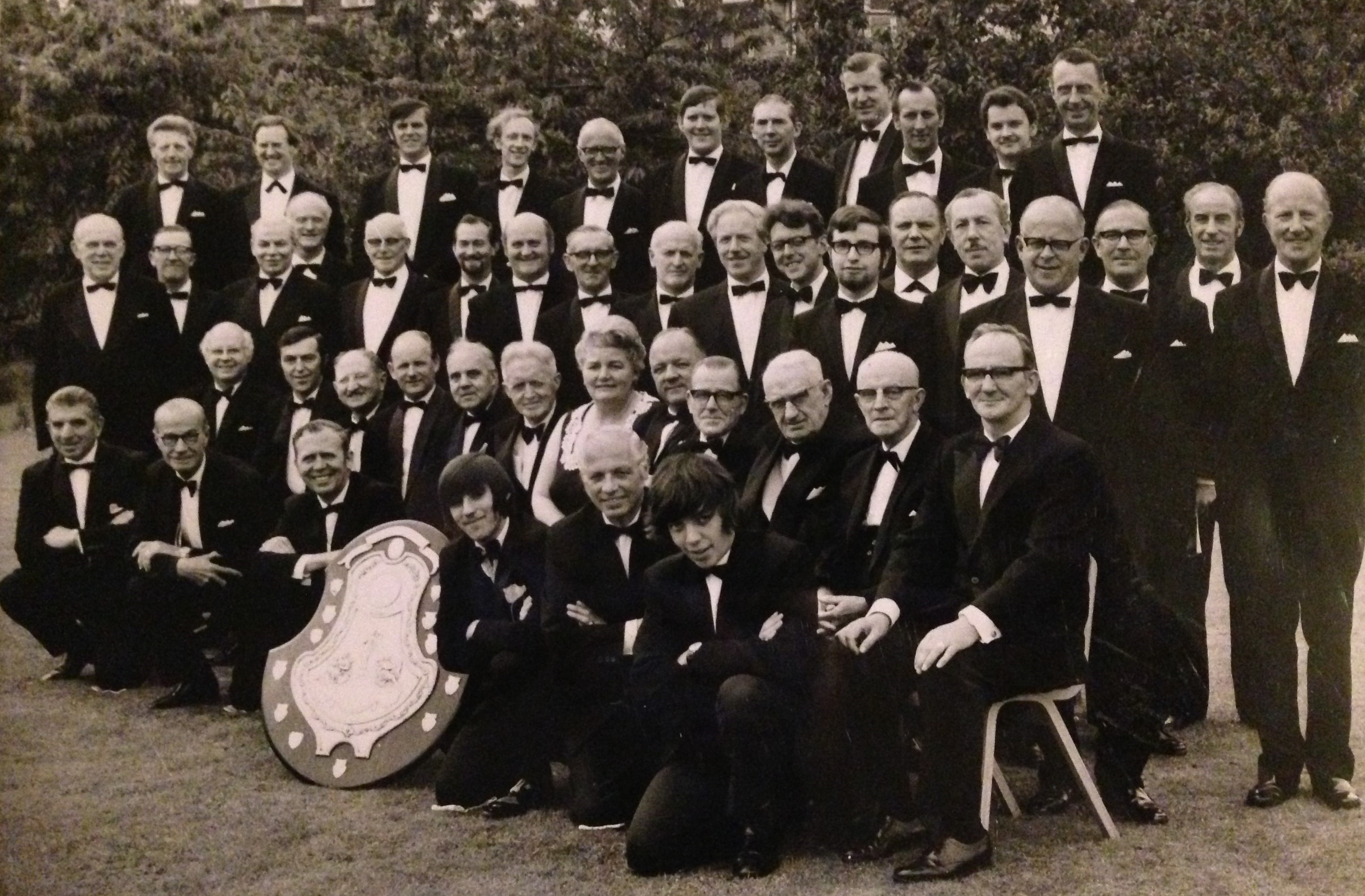
Leeds Male Voice Choir in 1970

== Later years: 1953–2013 ==
John Wheeler took the Director's baton in 1962 with his wife Ursula as the accompanist. He was a principal singer at Leeds Parish Church and was also conductor of Batley Male Voice Choir and Phoenix Park Male Choir in Bradford. Wheeler led the choir and began a series of exchange visits in 1969 with Dortsfeld Male Voice Choir in Dortmund, Leeds' twin city in Germany. The choir developed a concert schedule across Yorkshire and took part in various music festivals across Northern England also performing at the Royal Academy of Music in London.

In 1970, Leeds Male Voice Choir featured as part of the '1000 Voice Choir', accompanied by the Black Dyke Band which was recorded for Stars on Sunday on ITV, the choir also featured on the accompanying album issued in the same year. In 1971 the choir took first place at the Robertshaw Music Festival in Bingley. In 1974 the choir made a TV appearance on Hughie Green's Opportunity Knocks. In 1978 the choirs first album was released featuring some of the traditional male voice repertoire.

Under the direction of Nigel Wears the choir performed in 1988 and 1991 in the ‘Thousand Yorkshire Voices' concerts in The Royal Albert Hall in London. Brass band accompaniment came from both Brighouse and Rastrick Brass Band and Sellers International Band. The choir again returned to the Royal Albert Hall in 1994 whilst directed by David Burnett.

In 2013 the choir hosted the Sing For Heroes concert, gathering men from throughout the city to perform in Leeds Town Hall in aid of the charity Help For Heroes. The concert attracted a variety of new singers.

== Recent years: 2014–present ==
Following the appointment of Tim Knight, the choir launched a series of themed concerts, performing The Best Of British at Leeds Minster in June 2014. and then regularly across the city region. The choir lead the city's Festival of Remembrance in November 2018, commemorating one hundred years since the end of the First World War. Leeds Male Voice Choir celebrated one hundred years of singing in Leeds in Leeds Town Hall with Rothwell Temperance Band and The White Rosettes in September 2016, compered by Simon Lindley.

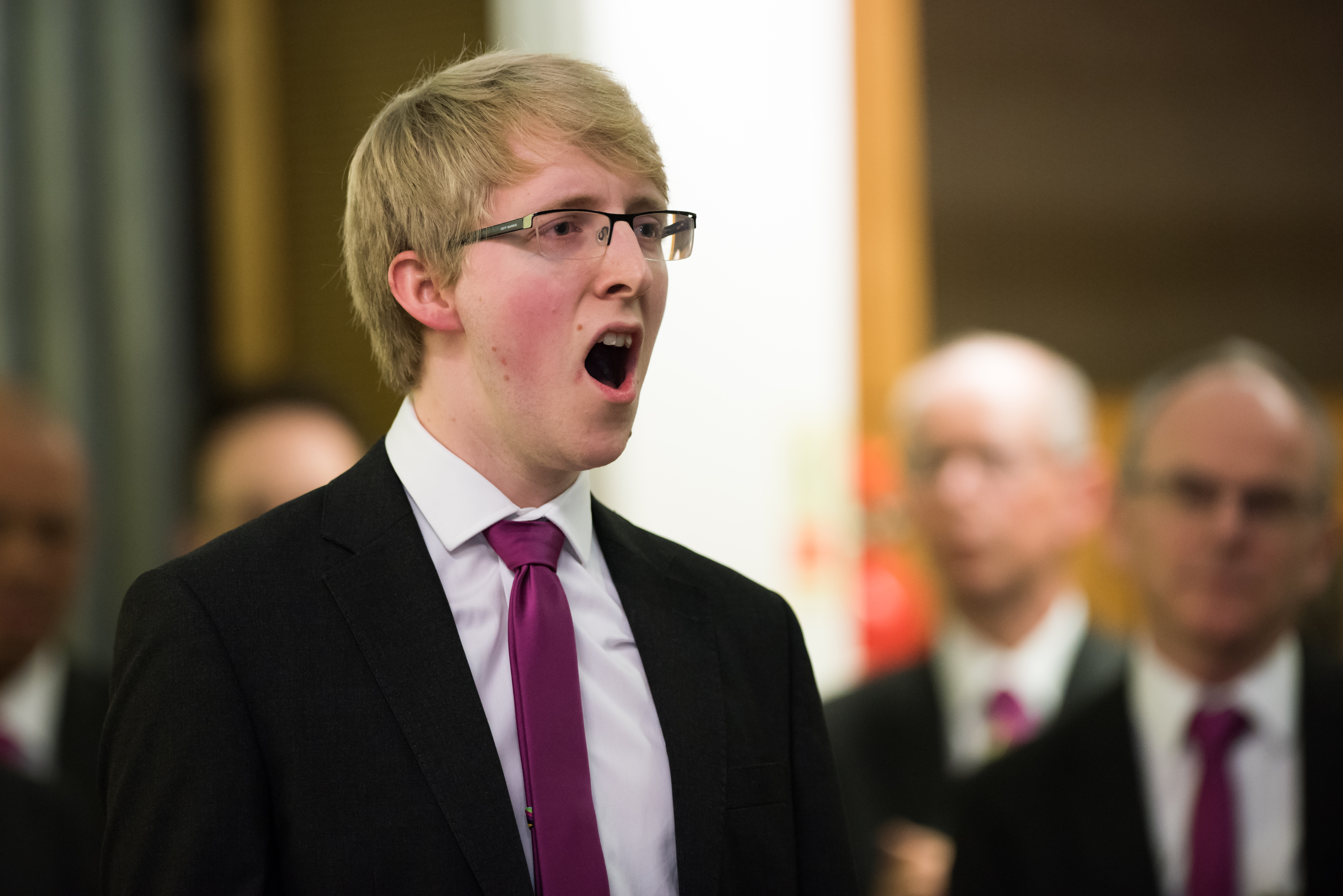
Leeds Male Voice Choir in 2018

The choir performs The Spirit of Christmas annually in December across Leeds and the nearby region, including Dewsbury Town Hall, Selby Abbey and Riley Smith Hall in Tadcaster.

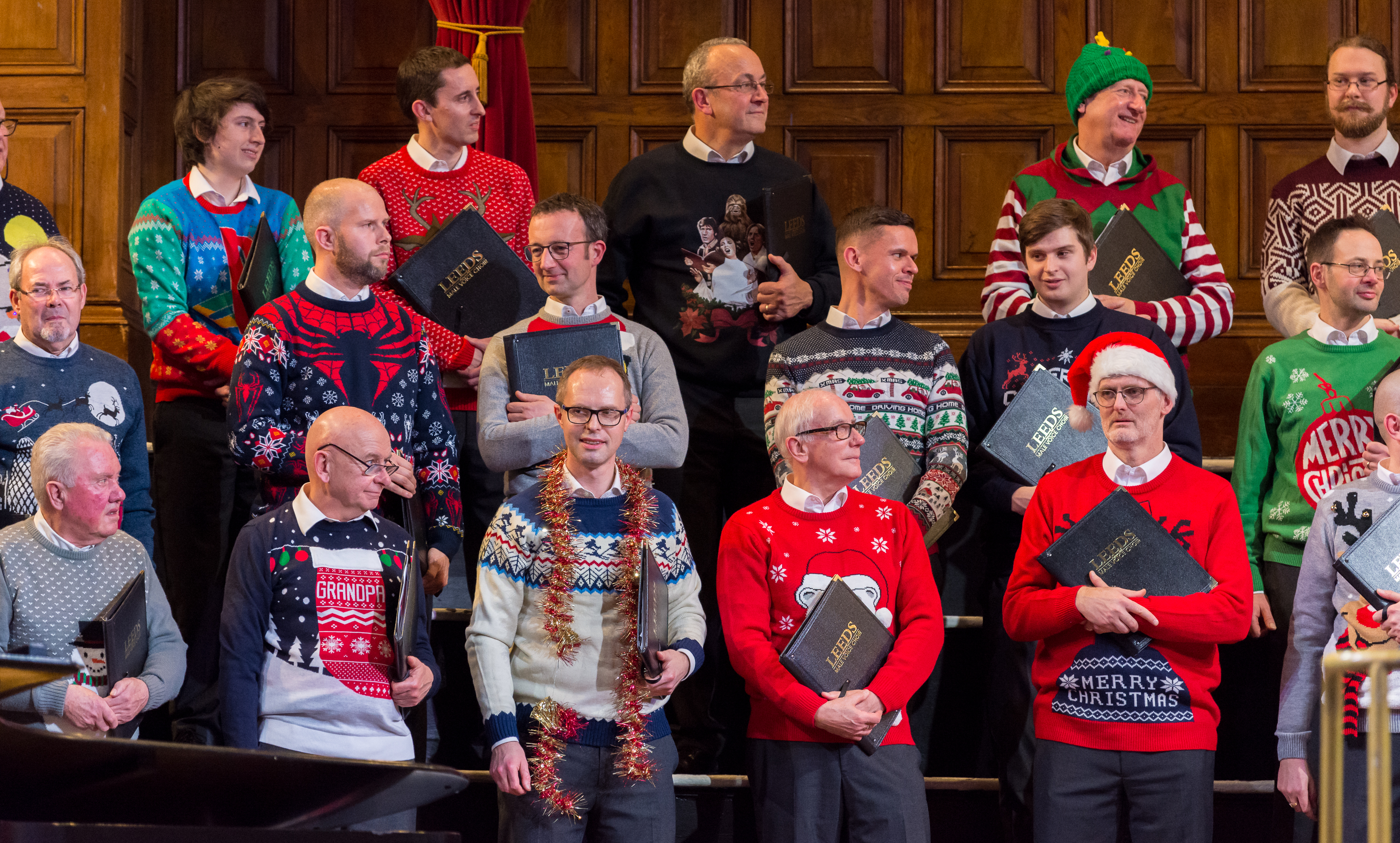
Leeds Male Voice Choir - 2018

The choir's divergence from the traditional male voice repertoire resulted in a more internationally and contemporary themed musical programme and the 2023 album The Road Not Taken.

In May 2017 the choir undertook their first international tour in more than 30 years performing across Belgium. Venues included the Menin Gate in Ypres and St Bavos Cathedral in Ghent. In May 2019 the choir performed in St. Stephen's Basilica, Budapest as part of a four day tour of Hungary. In September 2024 the choir toured the Czech Republic singing at St Vitus Cathedral in Prague.

In 2020s the choir has performed extensively across the North of England and Scotland including at Bridlington Priory, Lancaster Priory, Morecambe Winter Gardens, Doncaster Minster, Church of the Holy Trinity, Berwick-on-Tweed St John's Church, Wigan, Ushaw College, Durham and Carlisle Cathedral.
