= Orchard Lake (Minnesota) =

Lake in the state of Minnesota, United States

- Location within Minnesota
- Location: Dakota County, Minnesota
- Coordinates: 44°42′3″N 93°18′34″W
- Type: lake

Orchard Lake is a lake in Lakeville, Dakota County, in the U.S. state of Minnesota.

Orchard Lake was named for the wild groves of crab apple and wild plum that grew near this lake.

== See also ==
- List of lakes in Minnesota
