= Apollo Club of Minneapolis =

Men's choral organization started in 1895

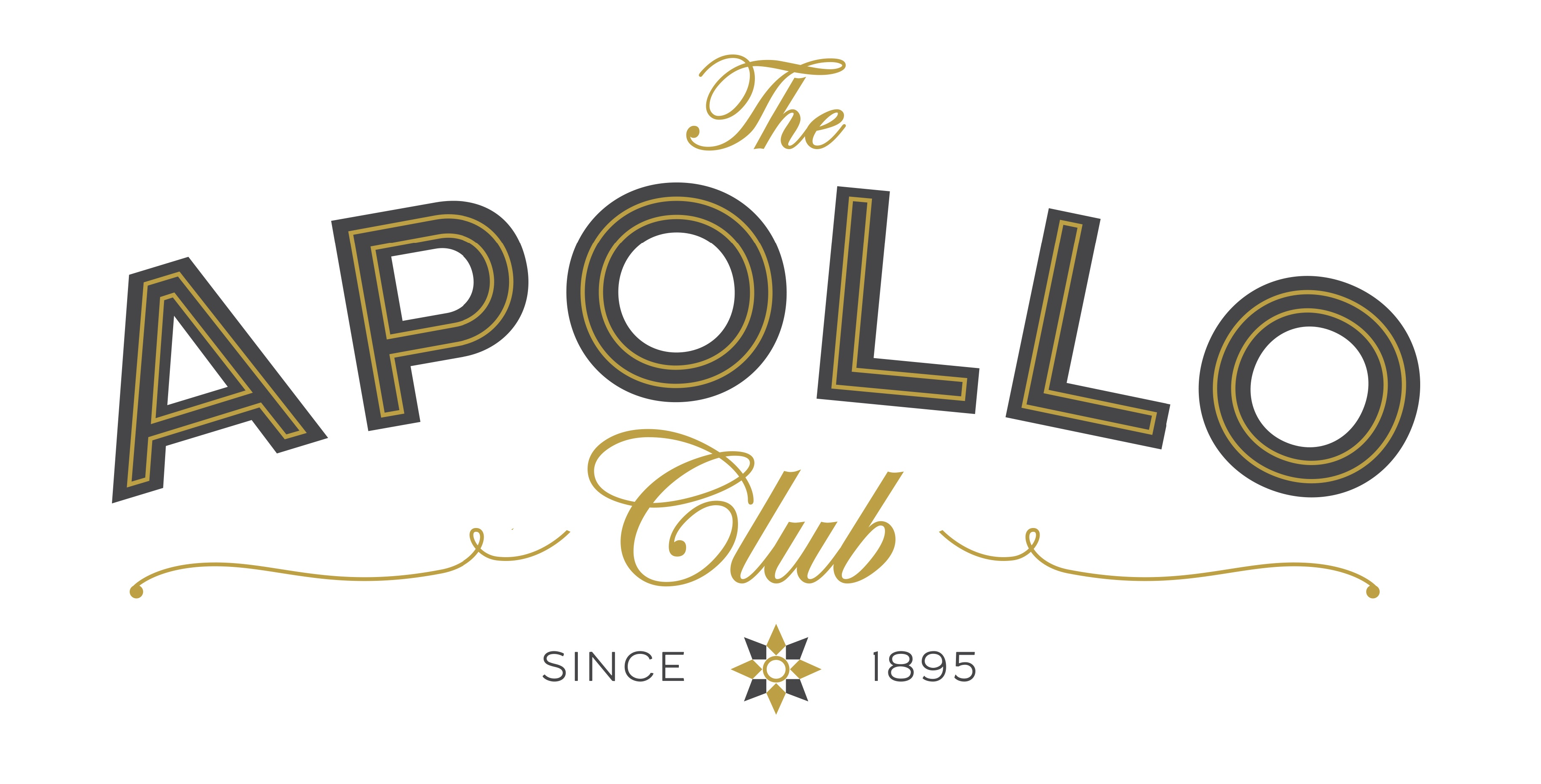

Background information
- Also known as: AMC, Apollo Male Chorus
- Origin: Minneapolis, Minnesota, United States
- Genres: Showtunes, choral, classical, folk music
- Occupation: Men's chorus
- Instrument: 60 voices
- Years active: 1895-present
- Members: Artistic Director: Dr. Chris McGinley
- Website: www.theapolloclubmn.org

The Apollo Club of Minneapolis is a choral organization founded in Minneapolis, Minnesota. The organization has been in operation since 1895, making it one of the oldest continually performing ensembles in the United States.

== History ==
The Apollo Club has a history intertwined with the music community of the Twin Cities, with roots dating back to 1887. In the spring of 1895, steps were taken to create a male chorus, and the organization was officially formed and organized on September 23, 1895. Emil Oberhoffer was the first conductor of the choir, who established a high standard of choral singing. The first public performance from the Apollo Club occurred in the Lyceum Theater, located in downtown Minneapolis, on April 13, 1896. Notable conductors and accompanists of the ensemble include Henry S. Woodruff, Theodore Bergman, Elsie Wolf Campbell, William Rhys-Herbert, William MacPhail, James S. Allen, and Roger Hoel. The Apollo Club of Minneapolis was inducted into the Minnesota Music Hall of Fame November 4, 2017.

== Honored Members ==
Honored membership may be granted to a member who has been an active member for 15 or more years, and has excelled in the following qualifications:

1. High qualities of Club leadership
2. Unselfish dedication and service to the Club
3. Ability to encourage, create and maintain a high degree of Club Morale
4. Other unusual circumstances may be considered by the Board in its discretion

Honored Members (Deceased)
Name	Year Received	Membership Status
Burton "Bud" W. Beidelman		Deceased
J. Carlton Berg		Deceased
Harold Bergin		Deceased
William Birch		Deceased
Wilfred Bland		Deceased
Dr. William H. Card		Deceased
Dean Chenoweth		Deceased
Gerald M. Clark		Deceased
Arthur H. Conary		Deceased
I.D. Cooper		Deceased
Richard Cravens		Deceased
W. M. Crosse		Deceased
Walter G. Dahl		Deceased
Dr. M.C. Dumas		Deceased
Charles B. Eustis		Deceased
George B. Eustis		Deceased
E. Stanley Ferguson		Deceased
Phil Fortin		Deceased
Willie Hale		Deceased
Channing Handberg Sr.	1993	Deceased
Charles E. Hasey		Deceased
Percy E. Hopkins		Deceased
James A. Hunter		Deceased
LeRoy A. Johnson		Deceased
William G. Kuehne		Deceased
Fred Kuesel	1997	Deceased
Don Jenkins		Deceased
Frank M. Joyce		Deceased
George L. LaVayea		Deceased
John E. Ledbetter		Deceased
George H.Lugsdin		Deceased
William MacPhail		Deceased
Christian W. Mattson		Deceased
Dr. Wayne H. May		Deceased
John Metzger	2010	Deceased
Robert Moberg		Deceased
John Moe		Deceased
Leonard Mogck		Deceased
Roland F. Molvahn		Deceased
Eldon J. Morris		Deceased
Clinton J. Nelson		Deceased
General Charles McCormick Reeve		Deceased
Rene T. Paradis		Deceased
Merrill D. Roberts		Deceased
F. M. Rutten		Deceased
Col. Clair F. Schumacher		Deceased
Oscar Seagle		Deceased
Omer A. Seim		Deceased
Robert L. Swinton		Deceased
Edwin W. Thompson		Deceased
Ove H. Ulring		Deceased
Oscar J. Van Lander		Deceased
William T. Walraven	2017	Deceased
Gerald W. Wassmund		Deceased
Howard T. Weber		Deceased
C. William Westafer		Deceased
Tony Whaley		Deceased
Frank R. Wilson		Deceased
Harry E. Wood		Deceased
C. Emerson Woodward		Deceased

Honored Members (Living)
Name	Year	Membership Status
Alvin Buss	2022	Retired
Roger S. Hoel	2018	Retired
Aaron Humble	2022	Retired
Darren Jackson	2026	Active Singer
Nadia Johnson	2018	Retired
Verner Johnson	2010	Active Singer
Curt McDougal	2014	Active Singer
Franz Metzger	2010	Active Singer
Richard D. Moseng Jr.	2015	Active Singer
Timothy F. Nichols	2022	Active Singer
Raymond Peterson	2019	Active Singer
Thomas Peterson	2019	Retired
Roger Renstrom	1996	Retired
Thomas Wilson	2014	Retired

== 50-Year Members ==
Apollo 50-Year Members (1896–present)
Name	Years	Length of time
Burton "Bud" Beidelman	1925 - 1991	66 years
Harold Bergin	1944 - 1994	50 years
William Card	1900 - 1950	50 years
Dean Chenoweth	1949 - 2016	67 years
Richard Cravens	1940 - 1990	50 years
Channing Handberg Sr.	1951 - 2007	56 years
Percy Hopkins	1940 - 1993	53 years
Ruthven "Rudy" Johnson	1940 - 1990	50 years
Verner Johnson	1967 – Present	59 years
Franz Metzger	1969 – Present	57 years
Oscar J. VanLander	1920 - 1970	50 years
William T. Walraven	1969 - 2025	56 years

== Choral Directors ==
Apollo Choral Directors (1896–present)
Name	Years
Emil Oberhoffer	1896 - 1900
Claude Madden	1900 - 1901
Charles A. Graninger	1901 - 1902
Hal Woodruff	1902 - 1928
William MacPhail	1928 - 1948
C. Wesley Anderson	Spring 1948
William MacPhail	1948 - 1950
C. Wesley Anderson	Spring 1950
Ralph Williams	1951 - 1955
James Allen	1955 - 1962
Oscar B. Dahle	Spring 1963
James Allen	1963 - 1966
Murrae Freng	1966 - 1970
Oscar B. Dahle	Spring 1971
Raymond Cutting	1971 - 1977
Roger S. Hoel	1977 - 2012
Nadia Johnson	2012 - 2012
Sean F. Vogt	2013 - 2016
Aaron Humble	2016 - 2022
Chris McGinley	2022 – Present

== Past Presidents ==
Past Presidents (1949–present)
Name	Year(s)
Oscar J. Van Lander	1949 - 1950
Eldon J. Morris	1951 - 1952
Luther Sletten	1953
LeRoy A. Johnson	1954 - 1955
Leonard H. Mogek	1956
John O. Laing	1957
Gerald Clark	1958 - 1959
Vincent Anderson	1960
J. Carlton Berg	1961
C. William Westafer	1962
Lawrence Whitely	1963
Roland Molzahn	1964
Dean Chenoweth	1965
Gerald Clark	1966 - 1967
Robert Moberg	1968
Omer Seim	1969 - 1970
Philip Fortin	1971 - 1972
Percy Hopkins	1973 - 1974
Alvin "Tony" Whaley	1975
Robert Swinton	1976
Channing Handberg Sr.	1977
Gerald Wassmund	1978
John E. Moe	1979
William D. Birch	1980
Frank Swensk	1981
John Madson	1982
Pete Mulvaney	1983 - 1984
Lowell Koenig	1985
Roger Renstrom	1986 - 1987
Tom Wilson	1988
Tomm Johnson	1989 - 1990
Phil Fortin	1991
Rich Westin	1992
Ray Peterson	1993
John Metzger	1994
Rich Moseng	1995 - 1996
Tim Nichols	1997 - 1998
Tomm Johnson	1999 - 2000
Curt McDougal	2001
Greg McCormick	2002
Wayne Boerger	2003
Tomm Johnson	2004 - 2005
Roger Wambheim	2006 - 2007
Tom Wilson	2008 - 2009
Ray Peterson	2010 - 2011
Craig Gerdes	2012
Tom Peterson	2013
Darren Jackson	2014 - 2015
Ray Peterson	2016 - 2017
Mark Bliven	2018
MacKenzie Young	2019 - 2022
Bill Kaemmerer	2023 - 2025
Tyler Frankhouse	2025 -

== Regular Concerts ==
Date	Concert name	Leadership C: Conductor A: Accompanist	Location	Songs performed	Guest artist
11/1948	Apollo 54th Season - 1st Concert	C: William MacPhail A: James S. Allen A: Robert W. Magnuson	Lyceum Theatre Minneapolis, MN	Hymn to Creation; The Day of Judgement; Pilgrim's Song; Traume (Miss Heidt); Standchen (Miss Heidt); Ruhe meine Seele (Miss Heidt); Cacile (Miss Heidt); Dedication; Ave Maria; Largo al factotum della citta; Black Roses (Heidt); Once a Lady was Here (Heidt); A Letter to Freddie (Heidt); Deborah (Heidt); Bird of Wilderness (Heidt); Morning; Steal Away; Roll, Chariot!; Onward, Christian Soldiers	Winifred Heidt
04/1949	Apollo 54th Season - 2nd Concert	C: William MacPhail A: James S. Allen A: Theodore Bergman A: Robert W. Magnuson A: Richard Zgodava	Lyceum Theatre Minneapolis, MN	Hymn to the Eternal; Cherubim Song; Hospodi, Pomiloi; Lamento di Federico (Lanza); La donna e mobile (Lanza); Impatience; Twilight; Fete Polonaise; The House of the Top of the Hill (Lanza); Tell Me, O Blue, Blue Sky (Lanza); Mattinata (Lanza); Down by the Old Bayou; Joshua Fit De Battle Ob Jericho; Chorus of Bacchantes; March of the Musketeers	Mario Lanza
11/1949	Apollo 55th Season - 1st Concert	C: William MacPhail A: James S Allen A: Theodore Bergman	Lyceum Theatre Minneapolis, MN	Hallelujah Chorus, Beethoven; The Long Day Closes; A Mighty Fortress Is Our God; Recondita armonia (Conley); Il mio tesoro (Conley); Allerseelen; Grief; Land-Sighting; Ah, Moon of My Delight (Conley); Finnegan's Wake (Conley); Swans (Conley); Beloved (Conley); Gloucestershire Wassail; La Serenata; The Hills of Home; Rolling Down to Rio	Eugene Conley
04/1950	Apollo 55th Season - 2nd concert	C: William MacPhail A: James S Allen A: Theodore Bergman	Lyceum Theatre Minneapolis, MN	Grant Us to Do With Zeal; Come, Sweet Death; Cum Sancto Spiritu; Non più andrai (London); Monologue, from "The Emperor Jones" (London); Dedication; A Tremor's in the Branches; Nightingale, Thy Sweetest Song; Bird in Air Will Stray Afar; From Yon Hills the Torrent Speeds; Coronation Scene; Go Down, Moses (London); Because I Were. Shy (London); Lord Randal (London); Sailor's Life (London); You'll Never Walk Alone; The Sleigh Ride; Deep River; Galloping Song	George London
	Missing 1951 - 1958 info				
12/1959	Apollo 1959 Fall Concert	C: James S. Allen C: William MacPhail A: Theodore Bergman A: Dan Graham	Lyceum Theatre Minneapolis, MN	Veni Jesu; SOnata Adventa and Fugue; E lucevan le stelle (O'Neill); Nessun dorma (O'Neill); Che gelida manina (O'Neill); Du Bist Die Ruh; Die Mainacht; The Peacocks; The Bachelor; Preach me not your musty rules (O'Neill); The Swan (O'Neill); A Dream (O'Neill); Heart Cry (O'Neill); Lida Rose; Till There Was You; Seventy Six Trombones	Charles O'Neill
04/1960	Apollo 1960 Spring Concert	C: James S. Allen C: William MacPhail A: Theodore Bergman A: Dan Graham	Soul's Harbor Auditorium (Formerly Lyceum Theatre) Minneapolis, MN	Star-Spangled Baner; Laudamus; Send Forth Thy Spirit; Great and Glorious; Hallelujah Chorus (Beethoven); Che faro senza Euridice (Nikolaidi); Dido's Lament (Nikolaidi); Una voce poco fa (Nikolaidi); Magdlein Im Walde; Come To Me In My Dreams; Gram; Stomp Your Foot; Layarni (Nikolaidi); Habanera (Nikolaidi); Songs My Mother Taught Me (Nikolaidi); Summertime (Nikolaidi); Surrey With the Fringe On Top; We Kiss in the Shadow; Bewitched; Wunderbar; Almost Like Being in Love; So In Love	Elena Nikolaidi
	Missing 1960 - 1982 info				
04/1983	Apollo 1983 Spring Concert	C: Roger S Hoel A: Earl Buys	Orchestra Hall Minneapolis, MN	Behold Man; Nunc Dimittis; The Night; Hospodi Pomiloi; Better Watch Your Behavior (artist); Ah Been 'Buked (artist); Rockin' Jerusalem (artist); Ezekiel Saw De Wheel (artist); Wait on the Lord (artist); The Pasture; A Nun Takes the Veil; Bridal Party; Honr! Honor!; Every Time I Feel the Spirit; Summer Evening; Den Store, Hvide Flok; Halsa Dem Darhemma; Take the "A" Train (artist); Satin Doll (artist); Celebration (artist); Lilli Marlene; Lida Rose; Till There Was You; George M. Cohan Patriotic Fantasy	Sounds of Blackness
Missing	Missing Fall 83 through Fall 86				
05/1987	92nd Anniversary Spring Concert	C: Roger S. Hoel A: Nadia Johnson	Orchestra Hall Minneapolis, MN	O Sing Unto the Lord; O Vos Omnes; Salve Regina; Send Forth Thy Spirit; The Gamble Folk Songs; She is My Slender Small Love; Goin' Home; The Bells of St. Mary's; I Could Have Danced All Night; I've Grown Accustomed to Her Face; On the Street Where You Live; The Gamble Folk Songs; Ole Ark's A-Moverin; Honor! Honor!; Soon-Ah Will Be Done; Little Innocent Lamb	The Gamble Folk
12/1987	93rd Anniversary Fall Concert	C: Roger S. Hoel A: Nadia Johnson	Ordway Music Theatre St. Paul, MN Orchestra Hall Minneapolis, MN	Cry Out and Shout; Angelus Domini; Salvation Belongeth To Our God; Cherubim Song; Selection of Spirituals (Hale); Halsa Dem Darhemma; Den Store, Hvide Flok; Norge, Mit Norge; In Dulci Jubilo; Bring a Torch, Jeannette, Isabella; Oh Po' Little Jesus; Candlelight Carol; Caroling, Caroling; The Virgin Mary Had a Baby Boy; Christmas Carol Medley	Willie Hale Sandford Moore
04/1988	93rd Anniversary Spring Concert	C: Roger S. Hoel A: Nadia Johnson	Orchestra Hall Minneapolis, MN	Cry Out and Shout; O Vos Omnes; Cherubim Song; Hungarian Rhapsody, No 2 (Bailey); Bell of the Ball (Bailey); Brazilian Sleighbells (Bailey); Stella by Starlight (Bailey); Hallelujah Chorus (Bailey); O Sing Unto the Lord; She Is My Slender Small Love; Salvation Belongeth To Our God; Come Again, Sweet Love; John Peel; There's No Business Like Show Business; Show Tunes by Berlin (Bailey); Alexander's Ragtime Band; When the Saints Go Marchin' In; Do You Know What It Means to Miss New Orleans (Bailey); South Rampart Street Parade; Big Band Sounds (Bailey); Benny Goodman Medley; You'll Never Walk Alone	Rosemary Bailey
12/1988	1988 Fall Christmas Concert	C: Roger S. Hoel A: Nadia Johnson	World Theater St. Paul, MN Ordway Music Theatre St. Paul, MN	Tollite Hostias; Ave Verum; Listen To The Sounds in Heaven; The Virgin's Slumber Song; Shepherds, Awake; O Yule, Full of Gladness; Psallite (Angelica); Alleluia (Angelica); The Bells on Christmas Eve (Angelica); Tomorrow Shall Be My Dancing Day (Angelica); Rejoice! (Angelica); Frostiana; - The Road Not Taken; - The Pasture; - Come In; - The Telephone; - A Girl's Garden; - Stopping By The Woods; - Choose Something Like a Star; Let My People Go; Where Shall I Be; The Boar's Head Carol; The Sleigh; The Tulip (Minnetonka); Slave of the Moon (Minnetonka); Jesus Child (Minnetonka); Cantate Domino (Minnetonka); To Music (Minnetonka); The Beautiful Day (Minnetonka); Jack Frost (Minnetonka); (Some songs need to be added here)	The Angelica Cantani The Minnetonka Children's Choir
Missing	Missing Spring 89				
12/1989	1989 Fall Christmas Concert	C: Roger S. Hoel A: Nadia Johnson	Calvary Lutheran Golden Valley, MN St. Paul's United Church of Christ St. Paul, MN Orchestra Hall Minneapolis, MN	God's Son Has Made Me Free; Listen to the Sounds in Heaven; As It Fell Upon a Night; Here Is Thy Footstool; Go Lovely Rose; Hallelujah Chorus; Sempre Fidelis (Brass); Ding Dong Merrily On High (Brass); Mississippi Rag (Brass); Steal Away; Ain' Got Time To Die; The Virgin Mary Had A Baby Boy; Scherzo (Brass); Canzona Bergamasca (Brass); Parade of the Wooden Soldiers (Brass); The Sleigh; Pat - A - Pan; Carol of the Bells; Twas the Night Before Christmas	The Minnetonka Brass
Missing	Missing Spring 90				
12/1990	1990 Christmas Concert	C: Roger S. Hoel A: Nadia Johnson	Ordway Music Theatre St. Paul, MN Orchestra Hall Minneapolis, MN	With A Voice of Singing; Ave maria; How Beautiful Are the Feet of Him; Lo, How a Rose E'er Blooming; I wonder As I Wander; Winter Song; Wunderbar (Strings); Zorba the Greek (Strings); Edelweiss (Strings); The Night; O Vos Omnes; Oh, Po' Little Jesus; De Mornin' Come; Assorted Christmas Songs (Strings); White Christmas; Still, Still, Still; Candlelight Carol; Christmas Medley	Celebrity Strings
04/1991	1991 Spring Concert	C: Roger S. Hoel A: Nadia Johnson	Orchestra Hall Minneapolis, MN	Then Round About the Starry Throne; Be Thou My Vision; God's World; Echo Song; Harmonies (Moore by Four); Now Is The Month of Maying; Summer Evening; Good Fellows Be Merry; De Animals A-Comin; Harmonies (Moore by Four); Lord Listen To Your Children Praying; Somebody's Calling' My Name; Selections from South Pacific; - Younger Than Springtime; - This Nearly Was Mine; - Some Enchanted Evening; - There Is Nothing Like A Dame	Sanford Moore and Moore By Four Singers
11/1991	Apollo Sings - 97th year	C: Roger S. Hoel A: Nadia Johnson	Orchestra Hall Minneapolis, MN Ordway Music Theatre St. Paul, MN	Behold Man; If Ye Love Me, Keep My Commandments; Break Forth, O Beauteous Heav'nly Light; Ave Maria; Zion's Walls; Songs from Moore by Four (Saturday); Songs from Golden Strings (Sunday); Tarantella; Bless This House; Joshua; Songs from Moore by Four (Saturday); Songs from Golden Strings (Sunday); The Boar's Head Carol; Gesu Bambino; Do You Hear What I Hear; Sussex Carol; The Christmas Song; Silver Bells; Christmas Medley	Sanford Moore and Moore By Four Singers Cliff Brunzell and the Golden Strings
Missing	Missing Spring 92				
12/1992	Apollo 1992 Fall Concert	C: Roger S. Hoel A: Nadia Johnson	Unknown Location	God's Son Has Made Me Free; Salvation Belongeth To Our God; Wake, Awake; Great Is He The Lord Eternal; Ubi Caritas; Feasting I Watch; Noel Des Enfants (Minnetonka); I Lift Up My Eyes To The Hills (Minnetonka); The Snow (Minnetonka); Wolcum Yol! (Minnetonka); Listen to the Sounds of Heaven; O Holy Child; Laudamus; O Yule, Full of Gladness; Surrexit Pastor Bonus (Minnetonka); Lord, See the Good Works (Minnetonka); This Christmastide (Minnetonka); This Little Babe (Minnetonka); Go Tell It On The Mountain; De Mornin' Come; O Hearken Ye; Rise Up Early; Carol of the Bells; The Sleigh	Minnetonka Chamber Choir
04/1993	Apollo 1993 Spring Concert	C: Roger S. Hoel A: Nadia Johnson	Unknown	God's Son Has Made Me Free; Come Thou Holy Spirit; Nunc Dimittis; A Hymn To God the Father; Alleluia; Feasting I Watch; Ching-a-ring Chaw (Hale); Memories (Hale); Ain't Dat a Witness (Hale); Down to Da River (Hale); The Minstrel Boy; Gentle Annie; Were You There?; The Long Day Closes; Great Is He the Lord Eternal; Silhouettes; Any Dream Will Do; Benjamin Calypso; Don't Cry For Me Argentina; It Ain't Necessarily So; Ol' Man River; He's Worthy	Mr Willie Hale Sandford Moore
12/1993	Apollo Scandinavian Holiday	C: Roger S. Hoel A: Nadia Johnson	Orchestra Hall Minneapolis, MN	Cry Out and Shout; Den Store, Hvide Flok; Norge, mitt Norge!; Jubilate, Amen; Halsa Dem Darhemma; Land-Sighting; Feiar med vals (Danser); Lirppu larppu (Danser); Varsovienne (Danser); Fynbo (Danser); Onward, Ye Peoples; Du gamla, du fria; Norsk Faedrelandssang; Vart Land; Der er et yndigt Land; Brothers, Sing On; Lanti (Danser); Skonsk Masurka (Danser); Sjnmyravalsen (Danser); Pariser Polka (Danser); Today There is Ringing; Beautiful Savior; Lost in the Night; Oh, How Beautiful the Sky; Jeg er saa gladd; O Yule, Full of Gladness	Skandinaviske Danser Bob Gustafson Traditional Instruments
05/1994	An American Music Celebration	C: Roger S. Hoel A: Nadia Johnson	Ordway Music Theatre St. Paul, MN	The Star-Spangled Banner; Ching-A-Ring Chaw; Stomp Your Foot; At The River; The Pasture (Frostiana); Precious Lord, Take My Hand; The Gate of Heaven; Blues for K. C. (Wharton); Affirmation (Wharton); Summertime (Wharton); Ain'-a That Good News; Ain' Got Time To Die; Ole Ark's a-Moverin'; Amazing Grace; Mo' Better Blues (Wharton); Afro Blue (Wharton); Patriotic Fantasy (Cohan); - Yankee Doodle; - You're a Grand Old Flag; Stephen Foster Medley; - Beautiful Dreamer; - Oh! Susanna; - I Dream of Jeannie With the Light Brown Hair; - The Glendy Burk; - Come Where My Love Lies Dreaming; - The Camptown Races; Tenting on the Old Campground; Give Me Your Tired, Your Poor; This is My Country; Battle Hymn of the Republic	The Frank Wharton Quintet
12/1994	Holiday with the Golden Strings	C: Roger S. Hoel A: Nadia Johnson	Ted Mann Concert Hall Minneapolis, MN	Good News From Heaven; Ave Maria; A Christmas Carol; On Christmas Night; Sing Out The News; Selections by the Strings; Haleluya! Pelo Tsa Rona; Lisa Lan; The Prayer of the Cricket; Poor Little Jesus; Betelehemu; Selections by the Strings; Rise Up Early; Some Children See Him; Christmas Medley	Clifford Brunzell The Golden Strings
04/1995	"Wi' A Hundred Pipers"	C: Roger S. Hoel A: Nadia Johnson	Ted Mann Concert Hall Minneapolis, MN	Great Is Thy Faithfulness; Crucifixus; Nocturnal Serenade; True Love; Imitatione del Venetiano; The Foggy Dew; The Hundred Pipers; Selections by Pipe Band; The Galway Piper; Unchained Melody; Soon One Mawnin'; Marry a Woman Uglier Than You; Selections by Pipe Band; John Peel; "Come to Me, Bend to Me"; Loch Lomond; Barb'ra Allen; Amazing Grace	Macalester College Pipe Band
12/1995	Apollo 100 Year Anniversary	C: Roger S. Hoel A: Nadia Johnson	Ted Mann Concert Hall Minneapolis, MN	Hallelujah Chorus; Prayer of Thanksgiving; True Love & The Soldier's Lot; Shenandoah; Love Flows; The Last Words of David; Selections by Ensemble Singers; Selections by Chorale; Selections by Cantanti; Selections by Bel Canto; The Sleigh; Stopping by the Woods; Cherubim Song; The Christmas Song; Deck the Halls; We Wish You A Merry Christmas	The Ensemble Singers Dr. Phillip Brunelle The Minnesota Chorale Kathy Saltzman Romey The Angelica Cantanti Nancy Grundall The Bel Canto Voices Janice Kimes
03/1996	Apollo 100 Year Anniversary	C: Roger S. Hoel A: Nadia Johnson	The Ordway Music Theatre St. Paul, MN Orchestra Hall Minneapolis, MN	Hallelujah Chorus; Salvation Belongeth To Our God; Soldier's Chorus; Love Flows; O Bone Jesu; Where'er You Walk; The Hundred Pipers; Selections by St. Olaf; Selections by Cabaret Singers; Selections by Minnetonka Chamber; Selections by Augsburg Choir; Selections by Boy Choir; John Peel; The Pasture; Eidelweiss; Ole Ark's a-Moverin'; Deep River; Ride the Chariot	The St. Olaf College Choir Dr. Anton Armstrong Dale Warland Cabaret Minnetonka Chamber Choir Dr Roger S. Hoel The Augsburg College Choir Peter Hendrickson Metropolitan Boy Choir Bea Hasselman
12/1996	Apollo 1996 Fall Concert	C: Roger S. Hoel A: Nadia Johnson	Ted Mann Concert Hall Minneapolis, MN	Chorus of Returning Pilgrims; O Magnum Mysterium; Sim Shalom; O Holy Child; O Vos Omnes; Winter Song; Prayer of St. Francis (Cappella); All Good Gifts (Cappella); Festival Madrigal (Cappella); O How Beautiful the Sky (Capella); S'vivon (Bel Canto); Stopping by Woods (Bel Canto); Deck the Hall (Bel Canto); My Heart Rejoices (Bel Canto); Bells (Bell Canto); Round and Round the Dreydl Spins (Minnetonka Concert); Kling, Glocken (Minnetonka Concert); Jingle Bell Rock (Minnetonka Concert); God Rest You Merry; Set Me As a Seal; Betelehemu; Child of God; Cantate Domino (Chamber); The Father's Love (Chamber); Noel des enfants (Chamber); Tantum Ergo (Chamber); Sanctus (Chamber); The Storm is Passing Over (Chamber); Gloria in exegesis Deo (Chamber); It's the Most Wonderful Time of the Year (Bel Canto); It Is the Child (Bel Canto); Hodie! (Bel Canto); Set Me As A Seal (Bel Canto); Candlelight Carol (Bel Canto); Sing Out the News!; Precious Lord, Take My Hand; De Gospel Train; Angels We Have Heard on High; Cossacks' Song	Minnetonka Cappella Choir Glen Todd Bel Canto Voices Choristers Janice Kimes Minnetonka Concert Choir David St. Germain Minnetonka Chamber Choir Roger S. Hoel
04/1997	Apollo 1997 Spring Concert	C: Roger S. Hoel A: Nadia Johnson	Ted Mann Concert Hall Minneapolis, MN	Ah, Meadow, Meadow, Fair and Wide; Nunc Dimittis; Were You There?; Prayer of the Children; Humble; When You're Smiling (Dixie Dogs); Back Home Again in Indiana (Dixie Dogs); S'wonderful (Dixie Dogs); Sweet Georgia Brown; Golden Days; Without A Song; Almost Like Being in Love; Hava Nageela; When the Saints Go Marchin' In; South Rampart Street Parade; Do You Know What It Means to Miss New Orleans; State Street Strut; I Found A New Baby; Jamboree Ball	James "Red" McLeod The Dixie Dogs
12/1997	Apollo 1997 Fall Concert	C: Roger S. Hoel A: Nadia Johnson	Ted Mann Concert Hall Minneapolis, MN	The Boar's Head Carol; O Yule, Full of Gladness; Jesu Bambino; Ave maria; Noel, Noel; Carol of the Bells; Ring Those Christmas Bells (Lockheed); Alaneetanana (Lockheed); We Need A Little Christmas (Lockheed); Jingle Bells (Lockheed); Do You Hear What I Hear? (Lockheed); Christmas Comes Anew (South); Go Tell It On The Mountain (South); Run. to the Manger (South); Because It's Christmas (South); Rise Up Early; Prayer of the Children; Ain't Got Time To Die; The Sleigh Ride; All That Hath Life and Breath (Litchfield); The King Is Coming (Litchfield); The Straw Carol (Litchfield); Great Day (Litchfield); Let It Snow (Litchfield); Rock-A My Soul; Today There Is Ringing; Winter Song; Hallelujah Chorus	South St. Paul Male Chorus Mark E Howarth Litchfield Male Chorus Bruce Christensen Lockheed-Martin Male Chorus Kathy Hunter Andrews
04/1998	Apollo 1998 Spring Concert	C: Roger S. Hoel A: Nadia Johnson	Ted Mann Concert Hall Minneapolis, MN	King Jesus Is A-Listening; Roll, Chariot; O vos omnes; Ave maria; He Never Failed Me Yet; Lift Up Your Heads O Ye Gates (Gospel Choir); Come Let Us Sing (Gospel Choir); Worship (Gospel Choir); Love Is The More Excellent Way (Gospel Choir); He's All Over Me (Gospel Choir); Little Innocent Lamb; E'en So, Lord Jesus, Quickly Come; Prayer of the Children; Ain't Got Time To Die; Great Day (Gospel Choir); A Gift of Song (Gospel Choir); Holy, Holy, Holy (Gospel Choir); Widerspruch; Black Is The Color of My True Love's Hair; I Got Plenty O' Nuttin'; Gentle Annie; What Shall We Do With the Drunken Sailor	The Twin Cities Community Gospel Choir Robert "Eddie" Robinson
Missing	Missing Fall 98				
04/1999	Old-Fashioned Springtime Serenade	C: Roger S. Hoel A: Nadia Johnson	Ted Mann Concert Hall Minneapolis, MN	Cry Out and Shout; Ubi Caritas; Nigra Sum; Adoramus Te; Selections by Mary Beth Carlson; Praise Him; Eight Bells; Blow the Man Down; Lowlands; What Shall We Do With A Drunken Sailor; Prayer of the Children; When I Grow Too Old to Dream; So In Love; We Kiss In A Shadow; Selections by Mary Beth Carlson; Dry Bones; My Lord, What a Mornin'; Marry A Woman Uglier Than You; Whistle, Maggie, Whistle	Mary Beth Carlson
12/1999	Apollo 1999 Holiday Concert	C: Roger S. Hoel A: Nadia Johnson	Ted Mann Concert Hall Minneapolis, MN	Winter Wonderland; Do You Hear What I Hear; Pat-a-pam; Sleep, Little Tiny King; Jingle Bells; Oh Lord How Excellent Is Thy Name (Wayzata); Sheep May Safely Graze (Wayzata); Stepping on the Clouds (Wayzata); Noel, Noel, What a Wonderful Day! (Wayzata); Listen, as the Snowflakes Fall (Wayzata); Sussex Carol (Wayzata); Break Forth, Oh Beauteous, Heav'nly Light; King Herod's Black Decree; Alleluia; Song of the Three Wise Men; Come, Dear Children; Holiday Swing (Wayzata); Deck the Hall (Wayzata); Good Christian Firneds, Rejoice! (Wayzata); Jesus, Oh What a Wonderful Child (Wayzata); Go Where I Send Thee! (Wayzata); Bring a Torch, Jeanette, Isabella!; Indian Christmas Carol; White Christmas; Still, Still, Still; Sleigh Ride; Apollo & Wayzata; - O Come All Ye Faithful; - Joy to the World; - There Shall a Star from Jacob; - Twas the Night Before Christmas	Wayzata Women's Choir
05/2000	Missing Spring 2000 Info	C: Roger S. Hoel A: Nadia Johnson	Ted Mann Concert Hall Minneapolis, MN		Dorothy Benham Soprano Soloist Winner of Ms. America
12/2000	Apollo 2000 Holiday Concert	C: Roger S. Hoel A: Nadia Johnson	Ted Mann Concert Hall Minneapolis, MN	Sing Out the News; Carol of the Sheep Bells; Fantasia on Christmas Carols; Virgin Mary Had a Baby Boy; Selections from The Strings; Gloria; Veni Jesu; When Christmas Morn is Dawning; Ave maria; Jesus, Jesus, Rest Your Head; Love Came Down at Christmas; The Morning Star Upon Us Gleam; We'll Dress the House; Selections from The Strings; Christmas Medley	Cliff Brunzel and The Golden Strings
04/2001	Apollo 2001 Spring Concert	C: Roger S. Hoel A: Nadia Johnson	Ted Mann Concert Hall Minneapolis, MN	This Is My Country; Patriotic Fantasy (Cohan); The Blue Danube; Showboat Medley; Selections from Barbary Coast; Rise Up, Oh Men of God; Give Me Jesus; Great Is Thy Faithfulness; Lord, For Thy Tender Mercies Sake; The Creation; De Glory Road; In Dat Great Gittin' Up Mornin'; Selections from Barbary Coast; Kalinka; Down In The Valley; Sweet Georgia Brown	Barbary Coast Dixieland Band
12/2001	It's our 107th Holiday Concert!	C: Roger S. Hoel A: Nadia Johnson	Ted Mann Concert Hall Minneapolis, MN	O Yule, Full of Gladness; Lo, How A Rose E'er Blooming; Good News From Heaven; As It Fell Upon A Night; Ave Maria; Carol, Brothers, Carol; O Clap Your Hands (South Metro); Ave Maria (South Metro); Virga Jesse (South Metro); Psalm 24 (South Metro); Carol of the Drum; Christmas Hymn Sing-A-Long; Salvation Belongeth To Our God; Listen to the Sounds of Heaven; Oh, Po' Little Jesus; The Star Carol; De Mornin' Come; The Shepherd's Story (South Metro); Sweet Songs of Christmas (South Metro); Donkey Carol (South Metro); Go Where I Send Thee (South Metro); Go Tell It On The Mountain; Stopping By Woods on a Snowy Evening; White Christmas; Silver Bells; Child Of God	The South Metro Chorale
04/2002	Apollo 2002 Spring Concert	C: Roger S. Hoel A: Nadia Johnson	Ted Mann Concert Hall Minneapolis, MN	America the Beautiful; Grant Us To Do With Zeal; O Vos Omnes; Ave Maria; Nunc Dimittis; Chastushka; Selections from Tom Prin Trio; Down By The Sally Gardens; Love's Old Sweet Song; Loch Lomand; A-Roving; Ezekiel; Jonah; Selections from Tom Prin Trio; Bells at Eventide; Almost Like Being In Love; Maria; Come To Me, Bend To Me; Golden Days; Man of La Mancha	Tom Prin Trio
12/2002	Apollo 2002 Holiday Concert	C: Roger S. Hoel A: Nadia Johnson	Fitzgerald Theatre St. Paul, MN	Winter Wonderland; Gloucestershire Wassail; Sleigh Ride; Pat-a-Pan; Cossack's Song; Jingle Bells; Selections from Richardson Brothers; I Saw Three Ships; Midnight Clear; Sweet Little Jesus Boy; I Wonder As I Wander; Hail Mary; All On A Christmas Morning; O Day Full of Grace	Minnesota Richardson Brothers
04/2003	Songs of War and Peace	C: Roger S. Hoel A: Nadia Johnson	Ted Mann Concert Hall Minneapolis, MN	America the Beautiful; Patriotic Fantasy (Cohan); Tis Me, O Lord; Over Yonder; Sing Me to Heaven; Selections from Greenwood Tree; Hymn to Man; For the Fallen; In Flanders Field; When Johnny Comes Marching Home; Blow Ye The Trumpet; An Irish Airman Foresees His Death; The Minstrel Boy; Prayer of Thanksgiving; Selections from Greenwood Tree; We Shall Walk Through the Valley in Peace; Song of Peace; Battle Hymn of the Republic; Stars and Stripes Forever; Star-Spangled Banner	Greenwood Tree
12/2003	Apollo 2003 Holiday Concert	C: Roger S. Hoel A: Nadia Johnson	Ted Mann Concert Hall Minneapolis, MN	Now Let Every Tongue Adore Thee; O Holy Child; When Christmas Morn is Dawning; Ah, Bleak and Chill the Wintry Wind; Alleluia; Cherubim Song; Lo How a Rose e'er Blooming (Choirboys); O Holy Night (Choirboys); What Child Is This? (Choirboys); Angels From the Realms of Glory (Choirboys); Carols and Lullabies; In Dulci Jubilo (Choirboys); In the Bleak Midwinter (Choirboys); De Virgin Mary Had a Baby Boy (Choirboys); White Christmas (Choirboys); Silver Bells; Still, Still, Still; The Sleigh; Candlelight Carol; Do You Hear What I Hear; Happy Holiday; We Wish You A Merry Christmas; Hallelujah Chorus (Messiah); Silent Night	The Land of Lakes Choirboys
05/2004	Apollo 2004 Spring Concert	C: Roger S. Hoel A: Nadia Johnson	Ted Mann Concert Hall Minneapolis, MN	How Can I Keep From Singing?; Cantique de Jean Racine; Ave Verum; Were You There; Antiphon from Five Mystical Songs; Selections from Geoff!; Danny Boy; The Turtle Dove; Takin' Names; Nachtliches Standchen; Prayer of the Children; Selections from Geoff!; Bring Him Home from Les Misérables; Almost Like Being in Love - Brigadoon; Come to Me, Bend to Me - Brigadoon; We Kiss In A Shadow; The Impossible Dream	Geoff!
12/2004	Our 110th Holiday Concert!	C: Roger S. Hoel A: Nadia Johnson	Ted Mann Concert Hall Minneapolis, MN	White Christmas; Bright, Bright the Holly Berries; Cossack's Song; Winter Song; Masters in this Hall; Selections from the River Falls Brass; Joy to the World; Selections from the River Falls Brass; O Magnum Mysterium; The Sleigh; Sleigh Ride; Oh! Christmas Tree; Rockin' Around the Christmas Tree; Jingle All the Way; Sleep, Little Tiny King; Child of God	River Falls Brass
05/2005	Our 110th Spring Concert!	C: Roger S. Hoel A: Nadia Johnson	Hopkins High School - Concert Hall Hopkins, MN Ted Mann Concert Hall Minneapolis, MN	Another Opinion', Another Show; Jimmie's Got a Goil; I Got Rhythm; Marry a Woman Uglier Than You; Selections from InPulse; The Last Words of David; Ave Maria; Alleluia; Great and Glorious; John Peel; Good-day, Dear Heart; Kalinka; Dance, My Comrades; Selections from InPulse; You Raise Me Up; Sometimes I Feel Like a Motherless Child; Ain' Got Time to Die; Wade in the Water	InPulse
12/2005	Apollo 2005 Christmas Concert	C: Roger S. Hoel A: Nadia Johnson	Hopkins High School Concert Hall Hopkins, MN Ted Mann Concert Hall Minneapolis, MN	I Saw Three Ships; The Christmas Song; We Three Kings; A La Nanita; Salvation; Selections from Boy Choir; Joy to the World; Midnight Clear; Oh, Po' Little Jesus; A Christas Carol; Shepherds, Shake Off Your Drowsy Sleep; Jesu Parvule; Jesu Bambino; Selections from Boy Choir; Hark the Herald Angels Sing; You're A Mean One, Mr. Grinch; Merry Merry Christmas, Baby; Little Saint Nick; Carol of the Bells; Hallelujah Chorus; All Is Well (Apollo and Boy Choir); Silent Night (Apollo and Boy Choir)	Minnesota Boy Choir
04/2006	Apollo 2006 Spring Concert	C: Roger S. Hoel A: Nadia Johnson	Ted Mann Concert Hall Minneapolis, MN	The Hundred Pipers; Man of La Mancha; Veni Sancte Spiritus; Set Me as a Seal; Yesterday; Once to Every Man and Nation; Selections from The Limestones; Ipharadisi; Ol' Gray Robe; This Ol' Hammer; Shadrack; Civil War Medley; MLK; Ol' Dan Tucker; Selections from The Limestones; Sing Me to Heaven; Prayer of the Children; Suo Gan; Impossible Dream	The Limestones A Cappella
12/2006	Apollo 2006 Christmas Concert	C: Roger S. Hoel A: Nadia Johnson	Hopkins High School Concert Hall Hopkins, MN Ted Mann Concert Hall Minneapolis, MN	Sing Out the News; Break Forth, O Beauteous, Heavenly Light; Jingle Bells, Merry Christmas to All; Listen to the Sounds in Heaven; Only Begotten Son; Frosty the Snowman; Emmanuel Processional (Wayzata); What Child (Wayzata); Breath of Heaven (Wayzata); All Is Well (Wayzata); Psalm 100 (Wayzata); Feliz Navidad; Nigh Bethlehem; Hail Mary; Go Tell it on the Mountain; Goin' to Bethlehem; Noel, Noel, What A Wonderful Day (Wayzata); Holiday Reflection (Wayzata); Getting In The Mood for Christmas (Wayzata); Squeezing' Down the Chimney (Wayzata); Go Where I Send Thee! (Wayzata); We Wish You a Merry Christmas (Wayzata); Cherubim Song; Blue Christmas; Coventry Carol; Stay With Us (Apollo and Wayzata); Hope for Resolution (Apollo and Wayzata); Peace, Peace (Apollo and Wayzata)	Wayzata Women's Choir
05/2007	Apollo 2007 Spring Concert	C: Roger S. Hoel A: Nadia Johnson	Benson Great Hall Bethel University St. Paul, MN	Manly Men; There's No Business Like Show Business; Brothers, Sing On!; Jonah; 12th Street Rag; Grand Choeur Dialoge (Brass Band); The Lost Chord (Brass Band); Finale from the Organ Symphony (Brass Band); Lambscapes; Standing on the Corner; Gentle Annie; a path; The Auctioneer; He Never Failed Me Yet; Hoe-Down (Brass Band); Helter-Skelter (Brass Band); Aranjuez Con Tu Amor (Brass Band); When I'm 64 (Brass Band); Shield of Liberty (Brass Band); U.S. Armed Forces Medley; Loch Lomand; Not While I'm Around; Gonna Build a Mountain; America the Beautiful (Apollo and Brass); This Is My Country (Apollo and Brass)	Lake Wobegon Brass Band
12/2007	Apollo Male Chorus Un concert de Noel	C: Roger S. Hoel A: Nadia Johnson	Hopkins High School Concert Hall Hopkins, MN Ted Mann Concert Hall Minneapolis, MN	A Christmas Greeting; Cry Out and Shout; Winter Wonderland; Our Father; Bless This House; A Holly Jolly Christmas; Selections from Cafe Accordion Orchestra; Yuletide Rhythm; Stopping by Woods on a Snowy Evening; The Sleigh Ride; El Yivneh Hagalil; My True Love Gave to Me (What To Do With the Presents?); Christmas Flourish; Selections from Cafe Accordion Orchestra; O Holy Child; E'en So, Lord Jesus, Quickly Come; Christ in the Strangers Guise; Rockin' Around the Christmas Tree; All is Well; Silent Night	Cafe Accordion Orchestra
05/2008	We Will Remember Them	C: Roger S. Hoel A: Nadia Johnson	Hopkins High School Concert Hall Hopkins, MN	Friendship; Behold Man; Hallelujah Chorus; Why We Sing; Witness; America, The Beautiful; In Dat Great Gittin' Up Mornin'; Summertime (After 5); Come Sunday (After 5); Operator (After 5); A Child Is Born (After 5); Angel Eyes (After 5); The Mansions of the Lord; Medley; - When Johnny Comes Marchin' HOme; - Tenting on the Old Campground; - Over There; - Eternal Father, Stonrg to Save; - Last Letter Home; - For the Fallen; - If We Ever Needed the Lord Before; Tuxedo Junction (After 5); When They Begin the Beguine (After 5); Tangerine (After 5); Don't Get Around Much Anymore (After 5); I'll Be Seeing You (After 5); Glory to God; Even When God Is Silent; Let There Be Peace On Earth; Do You Hear the People Sing?	After 5 A Women's Vocal Ensemble
12/2008	Peace Will Appear	C: Roger S. Hoel A: Nadia Johnson	Hopkins High School Concert Hall Hopkins, MN Ted Mann Concert Hall Minneapolis, MN	Oh! Christmas Tree; Winter Song; Awake, Awake; Masters In This Hall Medley; - The Boar's Head Carol; - O Yule, Full of Gladness; Alleluia; Carol of the Bells; Frosty the Snowman (4Given); God Rest ye Merry Gentlemen (4Given); My Favorite Things (4Given); Carol of the Bells (4Given); Oh, Come All Ye Faithful (4Given); Dance of the Sugar-Plum Fairy; Midnight Clear; Ave Maria Medley; Mary, Did You Know; Carol of the Mother; Merry Merry Christmas, Baby; The Sleigh; Oh Holy Night (4Given); The Christmas Song (4Given); Santa Claus is Coming to Town (4Given); He's Got the Whole World in His Hands (4Given); Wonderful World (4Given); Jingle Bells (4Given); Gloucestershire Wassail; Salvation; Stars I Shall Find; Jingle All the Way; Silent Night	4Given An Acapella Quartet
05/2009	The Sound of Love	C: Roger S. Hoel A: Nadia Johnson	Hopkins High School Concert Hall Hopkins, MN	Zion's Wall; Ole Ark's a Moverin'; Down by the Sally Gardens; Come to Me, Bend to Me; Lydia, the Tattooed Lady; Choral Flourish! (Good Samaritan Singers); Indian Prayer (Good Samaritan Singers); And the Father Will Dance (Good Samaritan Singers); Sometimes I Feel Like A Motherless Child (Good Samaritan Singers); Hand Me Down My Silver Trumpet (Good Samaritan Singers); South Pacific Medley; - Bali Hai; There is Nothin' Like a Dame; This Nearly was Mine; Honey Bun; Some Enchanted Evening; Away from the Roll of the Sea; Shvanda Polka; Sweet Georgia Brown; Hello Girls (Good Samaritan Singers); Old Joe Clark (Good Samaritan Singers); L'il Liza Jane / Polly Polly Doodle (Good Samaritan Singers); Rhythm of Life (Good Samaritan Singers); You Raise Me Up (Good Samaritan Singers); Lullaby of Broadway (Good Samaritan Singers); Soon ah Will Be Done; Black is the Color of My True Love's Hair; We Kiss in a Shadow; Cherish Medley; Goodnight, Sweetheart, Goodnight; When I Grow Tool Old to Dream	The Good Samaritan Singers
12/2009	Reflections of Christmas	C: Roger S. Hoel A: Nadia Johnson	Hopkins High School Concert Hall Hopkins, MN	Deck the Halls; Last Words of David; Spiritual Medley; - Witness; - Go Tell it on the Mountain; - Goin' To Bethlehem; Wunderbar (Golden Strings); Brazilian Sleigh Bells (Golden Strings); Air For the G String (Golden Strings); Christmas Waltz (Golden Strings); Skaters Waltz (Golden Strings); Deck the Halls (Golden Strings); It's Beginning to Look a Lot Like Christmas (Golden Strings); Eine Kleine Nacht Musik (Golden Strings); The Ant Hill (Golden Strings); Edelweiss (Golden Strings); Ode to Joy (Golden Strings); Cross Cultural Medley; - African Noel; - Sim Shalom; - A La Nanita Nana; - El Yivneh Ha' Galil; Jingle Bells; Hallelujah Chorus; Sleigh Ride (Golden Strings); Phantom at the Opera (Golden Strings); Moscow Nights (Golden Strings); Summertime (Golden Strings); Joy to the World (Golden Strings); O Come All Ye Faithful (Golden Strings); White Christmas (Golden Strings); Cumana (Golden Strings); 'Twas the Night Before Christmas; The Colors of Christmas; Silent Night	The Golden Strings
05/2010	America Sings	C: Roger S. Hoel A: Nadia Johnson	Hamline University Sundin Hall St. Paul, MN Hopkins High School Concert Hall Hopkins, MN	Behold Man; The Road Home; The Pasture; You Raise Me Up; Home on the Range (Dakota Harmony); Courage Live (Dakota Harmony); Who Are the Brave (Dakota Harmony); Order My Steps; Alleluia; America the Beautiful; The God Who Gave Us Life; Nothin' Gonna Stumble My Feet (Dakota Harmony); Over the Rainbow (Dakota Harmony); Joshua Fit the Battle of Jericho (Dakota Harmony); Fire in the Furnace (Dakota Harmony); O Susannah!; Television Theme Songs; Duke Ellington Medley; Battle Hymn of the Republic	Dakota Harmony North Dakota
12/2010	Peace and Joy to the World	C: Roger S. Hoel A: Nadia Johnson	Unknown Location	Come Dear Children; Bless This House; The Virgin's Slumber Song; The Cherubim Song; O' Yule Full of Gladness; Bugle 'N' Boogie (Southside Big Band); Lullaby of Birdland (Southside Big Band); God Rest Ye Merry Gentlemen (Southside Big Band); Jingle Bells (Southside Big Band); Happy Holidays (Southside Big Band); Rise Up Shepherds and Follow; Listen to the Sounds of Heaven; Ave Maria; Oh Po' Little Jesus; Betelehemu; Down Basic Street (Southside Big Band); When You're Smiling (Southside Big Band); Softly as a Morning Sunrise (Southside Big Band); You're a Mean One, Mr. Grinch (Southside Big Band); Winter Wonderland (Southside Big Band); Joyous Christmas Song; Mary Did You Know; Christmas Flourish; Silent Night	The Southside Big Band
05/2011	Apollo Sings the Songs of Spring	C: Roger S. Hoel A: Nadia Johnson	Hamline University Sundin Hall St. Paul, MN Hopkins High School Concert Hall Hopkins, MN	Riu, Riu, Chiu; Were You There; Oo Vos Omnes; Somebody's Calling My Name; Let It Shine (Chamber Choir); E'en So, Lord Jesus, Quickly Come (Chamber Choir); The Lord is My Shepard (Chamber Choir); God Be In My Head (Chamber Choir); Beautiful Savior (Chamber Choir); Alleluia; Great is Thy Faithfulness; Friendship; Ain' Got Time To Die; You Are the New Day (Chamber Choir); The Falling Snow (Chamber Choir); The Seal Lullaby (Chamber Choir); The Opening Chorus "The Bartered Bride" (Chamber Choir); The Lord Bless You and Keep You (Chamber Choir); All My Loving; She Moved Through the Fair; Byker Hill; Danny Boy; Homeward Bound	Minnetonka Chamber Choir
12/2011	Home is Where the Heart Is	C: Roger S. Hoel A: Nadia Johnson	Hamline University Sundin Hall St. Paul, MN Hopkins High School Concert Hall Hopkins, MN	Break Forth, O Beauteous Heavenly Light; Bless This House; What Are the Signs; Mary Had A Baby; The Creation; A Ceremony of Carols (Women's Chorus); All That Hath Life & Breath Praise Ye the Lord! (Women's Chorus); The First Noel (Women's Chorus); Tundra (Women's Chorus); Stopping by Woods on a Snowy Evening (Women's Chorus); Stand Old Ivy; Big Ten Medley; A Welsh Noel (Women's Chorus); We Need a Little Christmas (Women's Chorus); Candy Cane Lane (Women's Chorus); The Little Drummer Boy / Peace on Earth (Women's Chorus); I'm Wishing You a Merry, Merry Christmas (Women's Chorus); Precious Lord, Take My Hand; Sing Me To Heaven; A Perfect Day; Cantique de Jean Racine; Lullaby Goodnight, My Angel; I Can't Tarry; Keep Your Lamps; Stay With Us	Wayzata Women's Chorus C: Carole Birch A: Mary Faddon
04/2012	Homeward Bound	C: Roger S. Hoel A: Nadia Johnson	First Lutheran Church Detroit Lakes, MN Performance Arts Center EGF High School East Grand Forks Stern Cultural Center NDSSS Wahpeton, ND Hamline University Sundin Hall St. Paul, MN Hopkins High School Concert Hall Hopkins, MN	Brothers Sing On; Summer Evening; Song for the Mira; Prayer of the Children; The Star-Spangled Banner; Selections from Copper Street Brass Quintet; Our Father; The 23rd Psalm; Wanting Memories; Homeward Bound; Ole Ark's a Moverin; Selections from Copper Street Brass Quintet; Man Of La Mancha; What Shall We Do With the Drunken Sailor?; Let the Bulgine Run; Witness	Copper Street Brass Quintet
12/2012	Wonderment and Joy at Christmas	C: Nadia Johnson A: Patty McPherson	Hamline University Sundin Hall St. Paul, MN Hopkins High School Concert Hall Hopkins, MN	Child of God; Carol of the Bells; Soon and Very Soon; Jesus What A Wonderful Child; Hallelujah Chorus; Prelude in G♯ minor Op. 32 no. 12 (Loren FIshman); Ballad No. 1 in G minor Op. 23 (Loren FIshman); O Holy Child; Ave Maria & Mary Did You Know; Wake, Awake; Let All Mortal Flesh; Christmas Tree-O; Three Preludes (Loren FIshman); Pasquinade, Caprice Op. 59 (Loren FIshman); The Christmas Song; Winter Wonderland; 'Twas the Night Before Christmas; Silent Night	Loren Fishman, Pianist
04/2013	Apollo 2013 Spring Concert	C: Sean F. Vogt	St. Bartholomew Catholic Church Wayzata, MN	Toccata (Vogt); It is Well With My Soul (Vogt); Praludium in D (Vogt); The Peace May Be Exchanged (Vogt); Ou s'en vont ces gais bergers? (Vogt); Bring a Torch, Jeanette Isabelle (Vogt); Sing dem Herrn; Brothers, Sing On; Byker Hill; Loch Lomond; Zions Wall's; This Is My Song; A Celtic Triptych; Let It Be; The Shortest Ballad in the World; Bridge Over Troubled Water	Dr. Sean F. Vogt Organist
12/2013	Missing 2013 Fall Information				
06/2014	Apollo Jazz Concert	C: Sean F. Vogt A: Barbara Brooks	St. Catherine's St. Paul, MN	Selections by George Maurer Group; For Once in My Life; Fly Me to the Moon; When I'm Sixty-four; True Colors; Bésame Mucho / One Note Samba; It's De-Lovely	George Maurer Group
12/2014	Cocoa Coffee and Carols	C: Sean F. Vogt A: Barbara Brooks	Jehovah Lutheran Church St. Paul, MN	Gloria in excess Deo; Christmas Time is Here; Glory Manger; March and Dance of the Sugar Plum Fairies; Stars I Shall Find; Go Tell it on the Mountain; A Swingin' Christmas; Walking in the Air; White Christmas; You're a Mean One, Mr. Grinch; Hark! The Herald Angels Sing; I Saw Three Ships; Silver Bells; In Dulci Jubilo; Silent Night	Copper Street Brass Quintet
01/2015	The Liberation of Auschwitz	C: Sean F. Vogt	Ted Mann Concert Hall Minneapolis, MN	Spitfire Prelude and Fugue Five Prayers I. Psalm II. Hymn III. Elegy Different Trains: America - Before the War A Survivor from Warsaw Different Trains: After the War Preamble for a Solemn Occasion Five Prayers IV. Meditation V. Hayom	Aaron James Baritone Soloist James Andrews Dancer Orchestra
05/2015	The History of Glee	C: Sean F. Vogt A: Barbara Brooks	Ted Mann Concert Hall Minneapolis, MN	To Anacreon in Heaven; A Drinking Song (Apollo and Glee Club); Please, Kind Sir; Jane, My Jane; Come Again, Sweet Love; Courante (instrumental Ensemble); Glorious Apollo; Farewell to Lochaber; Two Ballets (Instrumental Ensemble); Come, Sirrah Jack, Ho; Turn, Amaryllis; Partita V in C Major (Instrumental Ensemble); Bright Phoebus Has Mounted; Who Wrote the Book of Love; I Saw Her Standing There; Down in the Valley; When I'm Sixty-Four; The Shortest Ballad in the World; We Rise Again; Selections from Men's Glee Club; The Friar's Song (Apollo and Glee Club); The Yellow and Blue (Apollo and Glee Club)	Men's Glee Club C: Dr. Eugene Rogers C: Adam Wills Begley A: David Gilliland University of Michigan Instrumental Ensemble: Marc Levine - Baroque Violin; Jin Kim - Baroque Violin; Julio Elhard - Bass Viola; Phillip Rukavina - Lute and Guitar
12/2015	Lessons & Carols	C: Sean F. Vogt	Westwood Lutheran Church St. Louis Park, MN	Lesson One - Reading from Genesis; Praise Him!; Lesson Two - Reading from Genesis; Bashana Haba'ah; Lesson Three - Reading from Isaiah; Zion Hears the Watchmen Singing; Lesson Four - Reading from Isaiah; O Holy Child; Lesson Five - Reading from Luke; Ave Maria (Franz Biebl); Lesson Six - Reading from Luke; Pat-a-Drummer; Lesson Seven - Reading from Luke; Who Is He in Yonder Stall?; Lesson Eight - Reading from Matthew; Rise Up, Shepherd, and Follow; Lesson Nine - Reading from John; African Noel; Silent Night	Minnesota Boy Choir Ensemble Minnesota Mormon Chorale Men's Ensemble
03/2016	Limited Editions	C: Sean F. Vogt	Chapel of St. Thomas Aquina St. Paul, MN Westwood Lutheran Church St. Louis Park, MN	Unknown	Apollo Master Chorale
12/2016	Cocoa, Coffee and Carols	C: Sean F. Vogt A: Kerri LeJeune	St. Stanislaus St. Paul, MN Shepherd of the Hills Edina, MN	Boar's Head Carol; Carol of the Bells Fantasy; Deck the Halls; What Sweeter Music; Silver Bells; Gloucestershire Wassail; O Tannenbaum; Away in a Manger; White Christmas; Joy to the World; Sleigh Ride; Hark! The Herald Angels Sing; Christmas Day; God With Us For All Time; New Year Carol; Song of Peace (Dona Nobis Pacem); Stars I Shall Find; Ding Dong Merrily On High; Silent Night	Bells of the Lakes C: William H. Mathis
04/2017	A Musical Journey Down the Mississippi	C: Aaron Humble A: Dan Wanamaker	Jehovah Lutheran Church St. Paul, MN Westwood Lutheran Church St. Louis Park, MN	A La Claire Fontaine (Guitar: Mackenzie Young); All Winter Long (Flute: Chloe Knutson); Hail! Minnesota; Lost in the Night (Solo: Jenny Ubl); Ain'-a That Good News; 12th Street Rag; Sour Grapes (Pianist: Dan Wanamaker); Make Believe (Duet: Jenny Ubl and Aaron James); Walk Him Up the Stairs; Muddy Water; Old American Songs: - At the River (Apollo); - The Little Horses (Solo: Aaron James); - Simple Gifts (Solo: Jenny Ubl); - Chinga-Ring, Chaw; Down By the Old Bayou (Solo: Matthew Tintes); Easy Street; Ol' Man River (Solo: Matthew Tintes)	Matthew Tintes Narrator / Bass-Baritone Soloist Jenny Ubl Soprano Soloist Mackenzie Young Guitar Chloe Knutson Flutist Aaron James Baritone Soloist
12/2017	Life, Lessons & Carols	C: Aaron Humble A: Dan Wanamaker	Chapel of the Incarnation Luther Seminary St. Paul, MN Westwood Lutheran Church St. Louis Park, MN	Veni Emmanuel; In Dulci Jubilo; Sure on this Shining Night; Lo, How a Rose E'er Blooming; Christmas Lullaby (Solo: Stephanie Thorpe); Betelehemu; Go Tell It On The Mountain; We Three Kings; Alleluia from Brazilian Psalm; Riu, Riu, Chiu; Fum, Fum, Fum; God Rest Ye Merry Gentlemen; Angels We Have Heard On High; Stars I Shall Find (in Honor of Dean Chenoweth); White Christmas; Gloucestershire Wassail; Winter Wonderland	Stephanie Thorpe Soprano Soloist
05/2018	Ticket To Ride	C: Aaron Humble A: Dan Wanamaker	Chapel of the Incarnation Luther Seminary St. Paul, MN Lutheran Church of the Good Shepherd Minneapolis, MN	United Kingdom and Ireland: Danny Boy; Loch Lomond; Down Among the Dead Men; United States: If I Got My Ticket, Can I Ride?; They Call the Wind Maria; This Land is Your Land; America the Beautiful; Africa: Bonse Aba; Nkosi Sikelel' iAfrika; Tshotsholoza; Germany and Austria: Laut verkünde unsre Freude; Widerspruch; Happy Wanderer; Italy: O Sole Mio; La Serenata; Funiculi-Funicula; Japan: Sakura; Australia: Waltzing Matilda	
12/2018	Do You Hear What I Hear? Holidays from the Heart of a Child	C: Aaron Humble A: Kraig Windschitl	Chapel of the Incarnation Luther Seminary St. Paul, MN Lutheran Church of the Good Shepherd Minneapolis, MN	Do You Hear What I Hear? (Theo Schultz); Stopping By The Woods on a Snowy Evening; We're Walking in the Air (Kate Beahen); Sleigh Ride (Theo Schultz); Caroling, Caroling; Christmas Time Is Here; The Christmas Song; It's Beginning to Look A Lot Like Christmas; Dance of the Sugar Plum Fairy; Gloucestershire Wassail; Haneirot Hallalu; Light One Candle; Hail Mary; Joseph's Carol; Little Drummer Boy; Carol of the Bells; Ding Dong Merrily On High; Do You Hear What I Hear? (Theo Schultz)	Kate Beahen Soprano Theo Schultz Percussionist
04/2019	On With The Show!	C: Aaron Humble A: Kraig Windschitl	Chapel of the Incarnation Luther Seminary St. Paul, MN Lutheran Church of the Good Shepherd Minneapolis, MN	INTRODUCTION: Rock Island from The Music Man; There's No Business Like Show Business; MEN AT WORK: Anvil Chorus from Il Trovatore; Old Man River from Showboat; Seize the Day from Newsies; MEN ON THE MOVE: New York, New York from On the Town; Oklahoma from Oklahoma; Va Pensiero from Nabucco; Muddy Water from Big River; MEN AT PLAY: Drinking Song from The Student Prince; Stomp Your Foot from The Tenderland; Begin the Beguine from Jubilee; There's Nothing Like a Dame from South Pacific; MEN IN LOVE: Lida Rose from The Music Man; Bewitched from Pal Joey; Almost Like Being in Love from Brigadoon; Evermore from Beauty and the Beast	Dr. David Schmalenberger Percussionist
12/2019	Sing We Now of Christmas	C: Aaron Humble A: Erin Roe	Lutheran Church of the Good Shepherd Minneapolis, MN St. Philip the Deacon Lutheran Church Plymouth, MN	SING OUT THE NEWS: African Noel; Sing Out the News!; Gaudete!; Go Tell It On the Mountain; SING THEM TO SLEEP: Lullaby for Mary's Son; A La Nanita Nana; Still, Still, Still; SING TO CELEBRATE: We Need a Little Christmas; We'll Dress the House; Deck the Halls; Gloucestershire Wassail; SING IN COMMUNITY: Here We Come A-Caroling; Masters In This Hall; Apollo Christmas Carol Medley (Sing-a-long); - O Come All Ye Faithful; - Hark the Herald Angels Sing; - Silent Night; SING ALONG TO THE RADIO: Silver Bells; A Swingin' Christmas; Sing We Now of Christmas	Rebecca Friedrichs Percussionist Zachary Brown Percussionist
04/2020	~~A Festival of Song:~~ ~~Apollo Sings Your Favorites~~ (Canceled due to COVID-19)				
12/2021	I'll Be Home for Christmas	C: Aaron Humble A: Erin Roe	St. Philip the Deacon Lutheran Church Plymouth, MN	Coming Together: With a Voice of Singing; Coming Home: I'll Be Home For Christmas; We Need a Little Christmas; Celebrating The Season: Deck the Halls; White Christmas; Jingle Bells (Soloists: MacKenzie Young, Justin Cervantes and Tyler Frankhouse); For What We've Lost: Sure on This Shining Night; We Shall Walk Through the Valley in Peace; Gabriel's Oboe (Oboe: Rachel Domingue); A Call For Rejoicing: Love Came Down at Christmas (Oboe: Rachel Domingue); As It Fell Upon a Night; Angels We Have Heard On High; The Gift of Friendship: Friendship; You'll Never Walk Alone	Rachel Domingue Oboist
04/2022	How Can We Keep From Singing?	C: Aaron Humble A: Erin Roe	St. Philip the Deacon Lutheran Church Plymouth, MN	Introduction: How Can I Keep From Singing?; Songs of Prayer Songs of Prayer: Even When God is Silent; Prayer of the Children; Deep River; Songs for Country: The Mansions of the Lord; When Johnny Comes Marching Home; Battle Hymn of the Republic (Soloist: Tyler Frankhouse); Songs of the Sea: Away From the Roll of the Sea; Down Among the Dead Men; Drunken Sailor; Songs of Commemoration Songs of Commemoration: Danny Boy (Soloists: Eric Davis and Jonathan Sussman); Loch Lomond (Soloists: Mackenzie Young and Jack Larson); Songs for Tomorrow: Impossible Dream; We Rise Again (Soloists: David Peterson and Justin Cervantes)	
12/2022	Apollo in December: Gifts of Word and Song to Ring in Your Holidays!	C: Chris McGinley A: Erin Roe	Immanuel Lutheran Church St. Paul, MN St. Phillip the Deacon Lutheran Church Plymouth, MN	Part I - Lessons & Carols: Creator Alme Siderum; The Bells; O Come, O Come, Emmanuel; I Heard the Bells on Christmas Day; The Holly and the Ivy; Christmas Lullaby (Soloist: Patrick Lair); Mary Had a Baby (Soloist: Fred Jensen); Ding! Dong! Merrily on High; Night of Silence (Silent Night); Part II: Ana El Na; Artsa Alinu; Ose Shalom; Here in My House; Have Yourself a Merry Little Christmas; Gloucestershire Wassail (Soloist: Tyler Frankhouse); Christmas in about 3 Minutes	Ellen Hacker, Pianist Niloofar Sohl, Viola
04/2023	Spring Concert: "A Toast!"	C: Chris McGinley A: Erin Roe	Immanuel Lutheran Church St. Paul, MN St. Phillip the Deacon Lutheran Church Plymouth, MN	Introduction: Great Apollo; TOAST: Vive L'Amour: Ain'-A That Good News; Sanctus; Laudamus; TOAST: Gaudeamus Igitur: John Peel; The Bridge Builder; We Rise Again; Hail Minnesota!; By the Waters of Minnetonka; TOAST: A Drinking Song: M-O-T-H-E-R; Sweetheart; TOAST: Ein Prosit: I Have Had Singing; Friendship; Brothers, Sing-on!	
12/2023	Fall Concert: "NOEL!"	C: Chris McGinley A: Erin Roe	Sundin Music Hall, Hamline University St. Paul, MN St. Phillip the Deacon Lutheran Church Plymouth, MN	Part 1: Christmas Carol Medley; Glory to God; I. All Glory, Laud and Honor; II. Prophesy; III. The Annunciation (Soloist: Nathaniel Pierce); IV. The Birth of Christ; V. At the Manger; VI. The Wise Men; VII. All Glory, Laud and Honor; Part 2: Noel! (Percussion: Jack Johnson, Ben Wagner. Soloists: Tyler Frankhouse, Jay Krohn); O Magnum Mysterium; Carol of the Bells; Still, Still, Still (Soloist: Matthew St. Martin); Fum, Fum, Fum; A La Nanita Nana; Gloucestershire Wassail (Soloists: Will Douty, David Peterson, Elias Pohren-Everett); The First Noel	
4/2024	Spring Concert: Songs of the Open Road	C: Chris McGinley A: Erin Roe	Richfield United Methodist Church Richfield, MN St. Phillip the Deacon Lutheran Church Plymouth, MN	Songs of the Open Road; Poljusko Pole; Galbally Farmer; The Awakening; Lonesome Road; Order My Steps; Homing; A Plainsman's Song (Soloist: Tyler Frankhouse); Take Me Home, Country Roads; The Bridge Builder; A-Roving; Tskhenosnuri (Soloists: Stephen Hazucha, John Hazucha, John-Marc Hazucha, Tyler Behny); Movin' On (Soloist: Steve Sallstrom); Loch Lomond (Soloist: Jay Krohn); Impossible Dream; You'll Never Walk Alone	
12/2024	Fall Concert: "Stories of the Season"	C: Chris McGinley A: Erin Roe	Sundin Music Hall, Hamline University St. Paul, MN Normandale Lutheran Edina, MN	I. OF THE ANGELS: Huron Carol (Guitar: Stephen Huot); Gaudete (Soloists: Will Douty, Tyler Frankhouse, Chris Renaud, Ryan Zettlemoyer); Lux Aurumque (Soloists: Sean Bonfoey, Tyler Behny, Sergei Raspel, Kyle Stumpf); II. OF THE PEOPLE: Do You Hear What I Hear?; Three Kings (Soloist: Tyler Frankhouse); Rise Up, Shepherd, and Follow (Soloist: Tyler Frankhouse, John Hazucha, Jay Krohn, David Peterson); III. OF HANUKKAH: Mi Zeh Y'Malleil (Soloist: Ryan Zettlemoyer); Sing Unto God (Soloist: Tyler Behny, John Hazucha); Maoz Tzur; Twas the Night Before Christmas (Soloist: Justin Cervantes, John Hazucha, Phillip Hunter, David Peterson); Es Ist Ein Ros Entsprungen (Soloist: Elias Pohren-Everett); Far Away, What Spender Comes This Day? (Small Group: "General Eclectic"); Winter Song; Stopping By the Woods on a Snowy Evening; Stars I Shall Find; Christmas Carol Medley (Soloist: Fred Jensen); Night of Silence (Guitar: Stephen Huot)	
5/2025	ENCORE! Songs from Stage and Screen	C: Chris McGinley A: Erin Roe	Sundin Music Hall, Hamline University St. Paul, MN Woman's Club of Minneapolis, Minneapolis, MN	There's No Business Like Show Business; Sing Unto God (Soloists: Tyler Behny and John Hazucha); Plorate filii Israel; I Want to Sing in Opera (Soloist: John Hazucha); Opera Medley: "Men at Work"; Pirates: Oh, Better Far to Live and Die (Soloist: Jake Dushek); Bullfighters: Song of the Toreador (Soloist: Jay Krohn); Soldiers: Soldier's Introduction; Hunters: Oh Cheerily Soundeth the Hunter's Horn; Auctioneers: Auctioneer's Song (Soloist: Tyler Behny); Priests: O Isis and Osiris; Laborers: Anvil Chorus; Nessun Dorma; Pure Imagination (Soloist: John-Marc Hazucha); Oy Poina (Soloist: General Eclectic); Baba Yetu (Soloists: Tyler Behny, Will Douty); Not While I'm Around; Broadway Medley; Consider Yourself; On the Street Where You Live; Put on a Happy Face; Summertime; Climb Every Mountain; Bye Bye Blackbird (Soloist: Chris Renaud); John Williams is the Man (Soloist: Kyle Stumpf)	
12/2025	Apollo in December: Cathedral Classics	C: Chris McGinley A: Erin Roe	Normandale Lutheran Church, Minneapolis, MN Gustavus Adolphus Lutheran Church, St. Paul, MN	Prelude: Creator Alme Siderum (Kathrine Handford, Organ); Creator Alme Siderum; O Magnum Mysterium; Veni, Veni, Emmanuel (Soloist: Jack Vishneski (KQ)); This Little Babe; Lo, How a Rose E'er Blooming; Fantasia on Christmas Carol (Soloist: Taylor Quinn (KQ)); Angels We Have Heard on High (Audience Sing-a-long); Seigneur Je Vous En Prie (KQ); Ave Maria (Apollo and KQ); The Boars Head Carol (KQ); Requiescat (KQ); Tout Puissant (KQ); Christmas Time is Here (KQ); Hark! The Herald Angels Sing (Audience Sing-a-long); Haneros Halolu; Glow; Betelehemu (Solist: Elias Pohren-Everett and Jay Krohn) and (Percussion: Tyler Behny, Chris Renaud, Ryan Zettlemoyer); The Mirthful Heart (KQ); Night of Silence; Postlude: Bring a Torch, Jeannette, Isabella (Kathrine Handford, Organ)	Kaleidoscope Quartet Kathrine Handford (Organist)

== Notable performances ==
The Seven Wonders of the World film "Invited by Writer Lowell Thomas to perform two pieces for his 1956 motion picture—with a live performance of its premier in Chicago. "This Is My Country" served as the background of the film's finale."

Inaugural Ball, President Eisenhower "Performed in 1957 as part of the inaugural festivities in Washington D.C., launching President Dwight Eisenhower's second term in office."

Brussels' World Fair "Garnered fame on the global stage by performing at Expo 58 in 1958."

Eisteddfod International Choral Competition, Wales "Earned the distinguished honor of second place in this world competition in 1982 — being the first chorus in any category to place in the top three of first-time performers."

International Choral Kathaumixw Festival "Held in British Columbia, Canada, Apollo performed and placed second in the "Equal Voice Choir" Division in 1998."

Carnegie Hall "Apollo Club continues its tradition of offering world-class performances in the Twin Cities and beyond with a performance at New York's Carnegie Hall in 2014."

Minnesota Music Hall of Fame Apollo Club of Minneapolis inducted into Minnesota Music Hall of Fame. Friday, November 3, 2017. Turner Hall in New Ulm, Minnesota
