= Lincoln Portrait =

Classical orchestral work written by the American composer Aaron Copland

Lincoln Portrait, for speaker and orchestra, is a 1942 work by American composer Aaron Copland, some 16–18 minutes in length. Its scoring relies on the brass section at the opening and for climaxes; its speaker narrates excerpts from Lincoln's documents, notably the text of his Gettysburg Address. (The work is sometimes called "A Lincoln Portrait" but it was not published under this title.)

== History ==
Lincoln Portrait
A 23 second sample demonstrating the narration, by Gregory Peck, of Lincoln's documents along with the prominence of brass instruments for dramatic emphasis

Conductor Andre Kostelanetz commissioned Copland to write a musical portrait of an "eminent American" for the New York Philharmonic. Copland chose President Abraham Lincoln, and used material from speeches and letters of Lincoln, as well as original folk songs of the period, including "Camptown Races" and "On Springfield Mountain." Copland finished Lincoln Portrait in April 1942.

The Cincinnati Symphony Orchestra premiered the work on May 14, 1942, with William Adams as the narrator.

Because of his leftist views, Copland was blacklisted and Lincoln Portrait withdrawn from the 1953 inaugural concert for Dwight D. Eisenhower.

== Texts ==
Together with some descriptive comments on Lincoln ("Abe Lincoln was a quiet and a melancholy man"), the work contains the following excerpts from his speeches:

Fellow citizens, we cannot escape history. We of this congress and this administration will be remembered in spite of ourselves. No personal significance or insignificance can spare one or another of us. The fiery trial through which we pass will light us down in honor or dishonor to the latest generation. We, even we here, hold the power and bear the responsibility. (Annual Message to Congress [since the twentieth century, State of the Union], December 1, 1862)

The dogmas of the quiet past are inadequate to the stormy present. The occasion is piled high with difficulty and we must rise with the occasion. As our case is new, so we must think anew and act anew. We must disenthrall ourselves and then we shall save our country. (Annual Message to Congress, December 1, 1862)

It is the eternal struggle between two principles, right and wrong, throughout the world. It is the same spirit that says 'you toil and work and earn bread, and I'll eat it.' No matter in what shape it comes, whether from the mouth of a king who seeks to bestride the people of his own nation, and live by the fruit of their labor, or from one race of men as an apology for enslaving another race, it is the same tyrannical principle. (Lincoln–Douglas debates, October 15, 1858)

As I would not be a slave, so I would not be a master. This expresses my idea of democracy. Whatever differs from this, to the extent of the difference, is no democracy.

That from these honored dead we take increased devotion to that cause for which they gave the last full measure of devotion. That we here highly resolve that these dead shall not have died in vain. That this nation under God shall have a new birth of freedom and that government of the people, by the people, and for the people shall not perish from the earth. (Gettysburg Address)

== Instrumentation ==
Lincoln Portrait is scored for speaker and an orchestra consisting of the following instruments:

Woodwinds

2 flutes (both doubling piccolos)
2 oboes
1 English horn (optional)
2 clarinets in B♭
1 bass clarinet
2 bassoons
1 contrabassoon (optional)

Brass

4 horns in F
3 trumpets in B♭ (third optional)
3 trombones
1 tuba

Percussion

timpani
snare drum
cymbals
bass drum
tam-tam
glockenspiel
sleigh bells
xylophone

Keyboards

celesta (optional)

Strings

harp
Violins I, II
Violas
Cellos
Double basses

== Notable narrators ==
Notable narrators of Lincoln Portrait have included:

- Marian Anderson, Philadelphia Orchestra, conducted by Seiji Ozawa and Aaron Copland, both times at Saratoga Performing Arts Center (1966 and 1977)
- Maya Angelou, Cincinnati Symphony Orchestra, conducted by Louis Langrée, September 9, 2014
- Neil Armstrong, Cincinnati Pops Orchestra, conducted by Erich Kunzel, both times at Riverbend Music Center (1984 and 2009)
- Alec Baldwin, Philadelphia Orchestra 2009
- Justin Vivian Bond, The Orchestra Now conducted by Leon Botstein at Bard College, November 4, 2018
- Kingman Brewster Jr. (ambassador, former president of Yale University), Yale Symphony Orchestra, conducted by Rob Kapilow (1978)
- Richard Butler (Governor of Tasmania), Sydney Symphony Orchestra
- President Bill Clinton with the Arkansas Symphony, conducted by David Itkin, recorded March 2003.
- Hillary Clinton, Arcadia Symphony New York, June 30, 2026
- Judy Collins from the album Portrait of an American Girl (2005)
- Aaron Copland, National Symphony Orchestra, conducted by Leonard Bernstein, November 14, 1980, eightieth birthday concert
- Peter Coyote, Symphony Napa Valley, March 29, 2015
- Walter Cronkite, U.S. Air Force Symphony Orchestra
- Charles Dance, Cincinnati Symphony Orchestra, conducted by Louis Langrée, at the Royal Albert Hall for the BBC Proms, London, England, 2017
- Clifton Davis, Jacksonville Symphony, conducted by Fabio Mechetti, at Times-Union Center for the Performing Arts, 2009
- Richard DeVos, Grand Rapids Symphony, conducted by David Lockington, 2000
- Melvyn Douglas, Boston Symphony Orchestra, conducted by Serge Koussevitzky, recorded by RCA Victor, 7 February 1946
- Hugh Downs at the age of 91 with the Phoenix Symphony, conducted by Michael Christie, for the Centennial Celebration of the State of Arizona, February 2012
- US Army Master Sergeant Michael Dudley, Boston Pops Orchestra, 2000
- Julius Erving, Philadelphia Orchestra, 1991
- Frankie Faison, Montclair State University Orchestra, Spring 2000
- Henry Fonda, London Symphony Orchestra, conducted by Aaron Copland, at Walthamstow London, 1968
- Danny Glover, Appleton West High School Wind Ensemble, Fox Cities PAC, December 2002
- The Reverend Professor Peter J. Gomes, Boston Symphony Orchestra, July 2009
- John Goodman, Louisiana Philharmonic Orchestra, conducted by James Paul, The National WWII Museum for Veterans Day Concert; November 11, 2013
- Vice President Al Gore, New York Philharmonic
- Washington State Governor Christine Gregoire, Seattle Philharmonic Orchestra, Adam Stern
- Steve Guttenberg, South Shore Symphony conducted by Scott Jackson Wiley, Rockville Centre, NY November 2016
- Tom Hanks, U.S. Armed Forces Symphony, at the We Are One celebration, January 18, 2009
- Katharine Hepburn, Cincinnati Pops Orchestra conducted by Erich Kunzel (1988 Grammy Award nominee)
- Charlton Heston, Utah Symphony conducted by Maurice Abravanel
- Samuel L. Jackson, Orchestra of St. Luke's conducted by James Levine
- James Earl Jones has performed the piece several times, including with the Seattle Symphony, San Francisco Symphony, and at the Chicago Symphony Orchestra's Lincoln Bicentennial Celebration in February 2009, as well as with the Arkansas Symphony Orchestra (David Itkin, conductor), February 1999
- Barbara Jordan, Houston Symphony (Lawrence Foster, conductor)
- Sen. Edward M. Kennedy, Symphony by the Sea, at the Newburyport Yankee Homecoming, July 29, 2006
- Coretta Scott King, National Symphony Orchestra, conducted by Aaron Copeland, February 12, 1969, at Constitution Hall in celebration of Lincoln's 160th birthday
- Jim Lehrer, U.S. Marine Band, conducted by Jason Fettig, February 23, 2015, Time Capsule 1945: The 70th Anniversary of the End of World War II
- George McGovern, South Dakota Symphony Orchestra, October 2012 in his last public appearance before his death
- Walter Mondale, Minnesota Orchestra
- Robert A. Muh, Boston Symphony Orchestra, Boston Pops, conducted by Keith Lockhart, June 4, 2009
- Bill Schonely, Portland Choir & Orchestra, conducted by Edward Higgins, June 2015
- Paul Newman, St. Louis Symphony
- Barack Obama, Chicago Symphony Orchestra conducted by William Eddins
- Gregory Peck, Los Angeles Philharmonic, conducted by Zubin Mehta, April 9, 1996
- Vincent Price, Yale Symphony Orchestra, Leif Bjaland conductor
- Phylicia Rashad, National Symphony Orchestra, conducted by Gianandrea Noseda, Kennedy Center, 22 January 2017
- Heather Cox Richardson, at Tanglewood, August 2025
- Esther Rolle
- Carl Sandburg, New York Philharmonic, conducted by Andre Kostelanetz, 1959. Sandburg's narration won a Grammy Award in 1960.
- Norman Schwarzkopf, St. Louis Symphony, conducted by Leonard Slatkin
- Barry Scott, Nashville Symphony, Leonard Slatkin, July 6, 2008 (recorded by Naxos Records)
- Vin Scully, Los Angeles Philharmonic, July 13, 2017 at the Hollywood Bowl
- Tom Skerritt, Seattle Philharmonic Orchestra, Adam Stern (conductor)
- Harry_Smith_(American_journalist), Des_Moines_Symphony, July 3, 2026 at the 32nd annual "Yankee Doodle Pops"
- Kenneth Spencer, New York Philharmonic, conducted by Artur Rodziński, February 1946. Recorded on Columbia Masterworks
- Willie Stargell, Pittsburgh Symphony Orchestra, September 2000
- Adlai Stevenson, Philadelphia Orchestra, conducted by Eugene Ormandy (and recorded by Columbia Records)
- Juana Sujo with the Venezuela Symphony Orchestra conducted by Aaron Copland, Caracas, March 28, 1957
- George Takei with the Honolulu Symphony conducted by Samuel Wong, November 2004; also with the Oregon Symphony conducted by Carlos Kalmar, September 16, 2017
- James Taylor with the Los Angeles Philharmonic, conducted by John Williams
- Margaret Thatcher, London Symphony Orchestra
- Rex Tillerson, Dallas Winds, conducted by Jerry Junkin, November 12, 2019
- Gore Vidal, Los Angeles Philharmonic, conducted by Michael Tilson Thomas, at Hollywood Bowl, August 2, 2007
- William Warfield, several orchestras and conductors. Warfield's narration won a Grammy Award in 1984.
- André Watts with the Reading Symphony Orchestra conducted by Louis Vyner at Ford's Theatre in 1975. Watts narrated previously during the 1972–1973 season with Gunther Schuller conducting the Boston Symphony Orchestra at Tanglewood-Shed in Lenox, MA.
- James Whitmore, Boston Pops, conducted by John Williams, Governor's Island, Statue of Liberty's one hundredth anniversary celebration, July 3, 1986.
- L. Douglas Wilder, with the Virginia Commonwealth University Wind Ensemble, conducted by Terry Austin
- Frank J. Williams, Rhode Island Philharmonic, February 2009

== In Venezuela ==
Aaron Copland had come to Caracas to conduct the first Venezuelan performance of Lincoln Portrait on March 27, 1957. A New York Times reviewer said it had a "magical impact" on the audience. As Copland recalled, "To everyone's surprise, the reigning dictator, who had rarely dared to be seen in public, arrived at the last possible moment." On that evening Juana Sujo, an Argentine actress resident in Venezuela and an opponent of the repressive regime of Venezuelan President Marcos Pérez Jiménez, was the fiery narrator who performed the spoken-word parts of the piece. When she spoke the final words, "... that government of the people, by the people, for the people (el gobierno del pueblo, por el pueblo y para el pueblo) shall not perish from the earth," the audience rose and began cheering and shouting so loudly that Copland could not hear the remainder of the music. Copland continued, "It was not long after that the dictator was deposed and fled from the country."

== See also ==
- Names from the War
