= Marsha Mabrey =

African American conductor

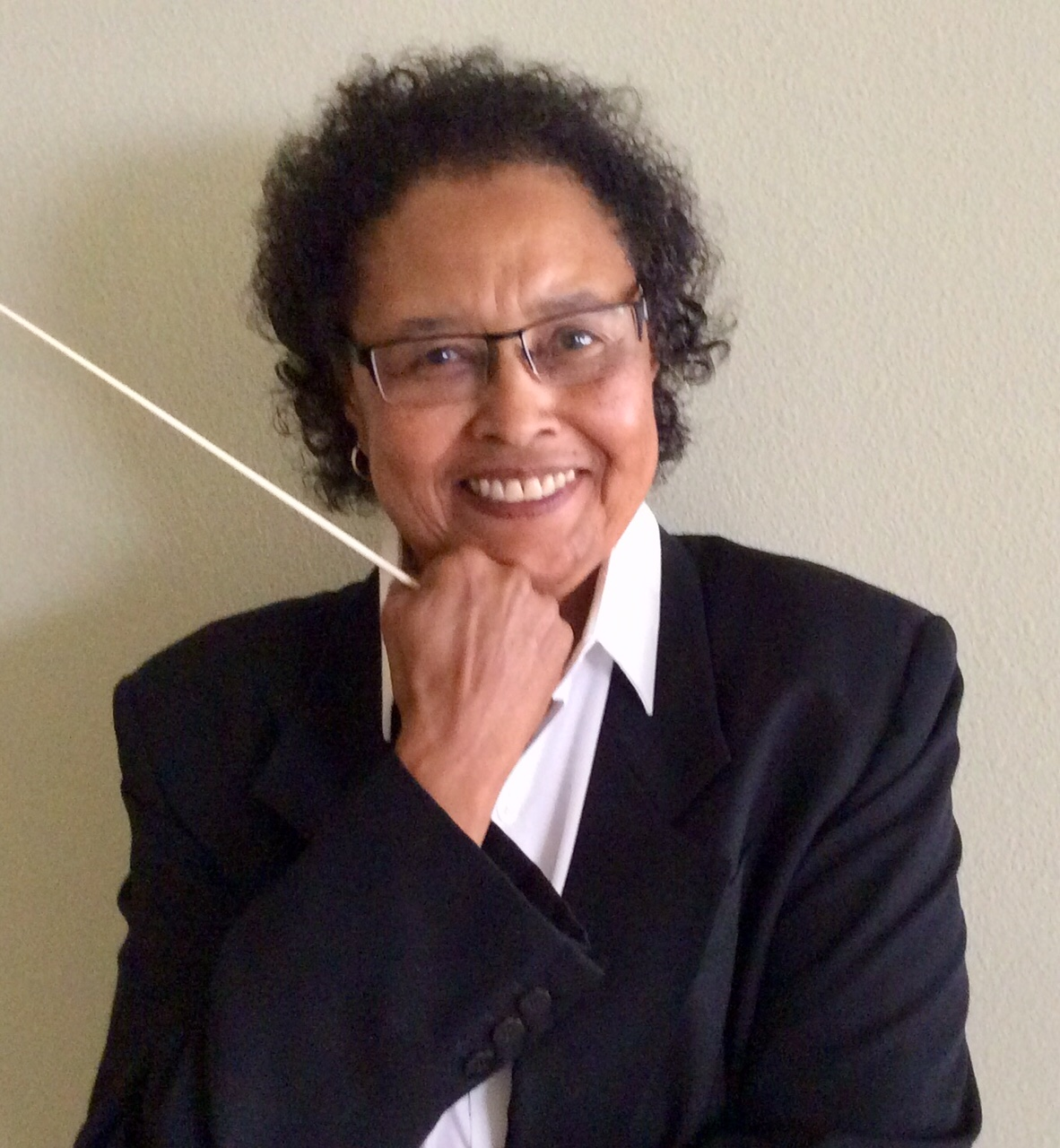
- Marsha Mabrey in 2020

Background information
- Born: November 7, 1949 (age 76); Pittsburgh, Pennsylvania
- Genres: Classical
- Occupations: Conductor, music educator

Marsha Eve Mabrey (born November 7, 1949) is an African American conductor and educator. She was the first African American woman to be appointed and serve as the conductor of the Seattle Philharmonic Orchestra.

== Early life and education ==
Marsha Mabrey was born in Pittsburgh, Pennsylvania, November 7, 1949. Her parents were Theodore Mabrey, an aerospace design engineer, and Ella Jones Mabrey, a homemaker.

Marsha began kindergarten in Niagara Falls, New York, and started the first grade in Ann Arbor, Michigan. Mabrey began her musical studies in fourth grade on violin. By the time she reached the seventh grade, Mabrey decided to become an orchestra conductor, "one who shapes the total picture rather than one who is only one element of the symphonic whole." She received a bachelor's and a master's degree from the University of Michigan (BMus 1971, MMus 1972) where she studied with conductor/violinist Elizabeth A.H. Green and Theo Alcantara. She also studied viola at Michigan with Francis Bundra and violin with Ángel Reyes. Mabrey finished coursework toward a DMA in orchestral conducting at the University of Cincinnati – College-Conservatory of Music.

== Career ==
Mabrey was always interested in teaching as well as conducting. She was on the faculty and served as conductor of several university symphonies: Winona State University, Winona, Minnesota (1978–80); Grand Valley State College (now Grand Valley State University), Allendale, Michigan (1980–82); University of Oregon School of Music, Eugene, Oregon (1982–89), and Cornish College of the Arts, Seattle, Washington (1998). She served as Assistant Conductor of the Grand Rapids Symphony Orchestra, Grand Rapids, Michigan (1980–81). She has been Guest Conductor of many orchestras in the US and Germany including Sinfonietta Frankfurt (Concert tour: Frankfurt, Offenbach, Hanau and Schwalbach, Germany), the Oregon Symphony, the Savannah Symphony, The Women's Philharmonic of San Francisco, and the Vancouver Symphony Orchestra.

She served as vice president for Educational Affairs for the Detroit Symphony in Detroit from 1991 to 1993, during which time she managed and facilitated the Ford Motor Company Youth Docent Program, Civic Orchestra, Educational Concert Series, DSOH Fellowship Program and the Unisys African-American Composers Forum and Symposium.

In 1996, she became the first African-American woman music director and Conductor of the Seattle Philharmonic Orchestra, Seattle, WA. In Seattle, she distinguished herself as both an advocate for community outreach and for programming lesser-known American composers such as Bern Herbolsheimer, Regina Harris Baiocchi, Joseph Curiale, and June Kirlin.

In Seattle, Mabrey also served as a string specialist in the Bellevue School District, teaching at Newport High School and Chinook Middle School. In Bellevue, the students receive music instruction every day. Her expectations were high, and her students thrived under her direction. She retired from the Bellevue School District in 2013.

Mabrey has been a board member of the Conductors Guild and a member of the League of American Orchestras and the Music Educators National Conference.

== Creative artistic projects ==
During her term as assistant professor of music at the University of Oregon School of Music, Eugene, where she was conductor and director of the University Symphony, Mabrey developed and directed the West Coast Women Conductors and Composers in Performance Symposium (February 1985) and American Women Conductors and Composers in Performance Symposium (February 21–23, 1986). These two significant symposia during the mid-80s and were supported by University of Oregon Center for the Study of Women in Society. The West Coast Symposium featured a panel of women composers including Elinor Armer, Emma Lou Diemer, Beverly Grigsby, Nancy Van de Vate, and Ann Hankinson. Participating conductors included Karen Keltner, Marsha Mabrey, Madeline Schatz, and Frances Steiner. The final evening of the symposium featured the presentation of women's orchestral works, including world premieres of works by Emma Lou Diemer and Nancy Van de Vate and a concert reading of a work by Ann Hankinson. The American Symposium expanded to the national scene and featured composers and conductors such as Ellen Taaffe Zwilich, Tania León, Libby Larsen, and Pauline Oliveros. Composer and pianist Elinor Armer gave the keynote address at the American Symposium, which featured chamber recitals and orchestral works by women as well as panel discussions, lectures and workshops.

From 1991 to 1993, during her tenure as vice-president for Education Affairs at the Detroit Symphony, Mabrey was developer and director of the African-American Composers Forum and Symposium, which was supported by a grant from Unisys.

== Personal life ==
Mabrey met her life partner Stephanie Wittman in 1976. Wittman is a social worker and psychotherapist. Wittman retired in 2014. Mabrey and Wittman married in 2013.
