= Kathleen McGuire =

Australian conductor and composer

- Born: Kathleen Alison McGuire; Melbourne, Australia
- Genres: Orchestral, opera, choral, musical theater, ballet
- Occupations: Conductor, music educator, composer, arranger, instrumentalist, singer
- Instruments: Classical guitar, bass guitar, clarinet, trumpet, saxophone, percussion, double bass, recorder
- Website: kathleen-mcguire.com

Kathleen Alison McGuire (born in 1965 in Melbourne) is a choral and orchestral conductor, arranger, composer, music educator, vocalist and multi-instrumentalist. Known also for her work with social justice and human rights organizations, from 2000 to 2010 she served as the first female artistic director and conductor of the San Francisco Gay Men's Chorus – the world's first openly gay choral organization – and in 2010 she established Singers of the Street: a choir of people affected by homelessness in San Francisco. She became a US citizen in 2011 and, in 2013, returned to Australia to serve as director of music at Queen's College (University of Melbourne) and co-artistic director of the School of Hard Knocks. In 2006, she was a grand marshal in the San Francisco LGBT Pride Parade. Her contributions have officially been recognized by the California Senate and State Assembly, and "Kathleen McGuire Day" was designated twice in her honor by San Francisco mayors Gavin Newsom (22 April 2010) and Edwin Lee (6 April 2013).

== Biography ==
The eldest daughter of high school art teacher Jeanette Mary Tilson and civil engineer Frank Leonard McGuire, Kathleen Alison McGuire grew up in the Melbourne suburb of Seaford and attended Carrum Primary School along with her siblings: brother Lawrence and sister Ruth. She began to sing from the time she could speak, and learned to play the recorder and guitar at grade school. Excelling also in sports and academically, at age 11 she won a scholarship to attend Mentone Girls Grammar School. Here she learned to play the clarinet and trumpet and studied music theory while continuing with classical guitar. She also sang in the school's choir. McGuire participated in community music organizations, including the Melbourne Moomba Youth Band, Frankston City Band, and the Mordialloc City Band, adding soprano cornet and side-drum to her list of instruments.

McGuire's interest in conducting came in her mid-teens when she had opportunity to conduct the school's concert band and also as assistant conductor of the choir at St Augustine's Church of England in Mentone, which she attended after the family moved to the Bayside suburb of Parkdale in 1980. She was also appointed as assistant conductor of the Melbourne Moomba Youth Band.

In 1983 McGuire was accepted as a bachelor of music student on classical guitar at the Melbourne Conservatorium of Music at the University of Melbourne, studying guitar with Peter Lynch. In the same year she was also appointed as music director of the Mordialloc Light Opera Company, where she honed her conducting skills directing such works as Gilbert and Sullivan's Iolanthe and Frank Loesser's The Most Happy Fella. In 1984, her university major changed to composition, studying with Peter Tahourdin. Although conducting was not offered to undergraduates, McGuire was allowed to conduct the university orchestra occasionally and she served as the assistant conductor of the Byrd-Cage Singers under the tutelage of Loris Synan.

After graduating with a bachelor of music degree in composition, McGuire taught music in secondary schools during the day while maintaining conducting appointments with multiple organizations, including the Melbourne University Choral Society, Malvern Symphony Orchestra, the Gilbert and Sullivan Society of Victoria, and Melbourne Opera Company. Many of her concerts were broadcast by Melbourne radio station 3MBS. She studied conducting with Robert Rosen, at first privately and then as a graduate student at the Victorian College of the Arts (VCA). In 1990 she founded and led the Victorian Women's Orchestra. In 1991, conducting the Australian premiere of the rock opera Metropolis, McGuire won the Victorian Musical Theatre Guild Award for Best Musical Director.

Still teaching part-time during the day, after completing a graduate diploma of arts in music at the VCA, McGuire subsequently completed a graduate diploma in education at Monash University. Conducting became her primary focus, however, and in 1994 McGuire was awarded a Rotary International Ambassadorial Fellowship that enabled her to go to England. She completed a master of music degree with distinction in conducting at the University of Surrey at Guildford, studying with Nicholas Conran and Owen Rees. While in the UK, McGuire travelled regularly to London to observe rehearsals of the English National Opera (at that time conducted by Sian Edwards), and also met Simone Young who was conducting at Covent Garden. Young encouraged McGuire to pursue a conducting career in the US.

McGuire travelled to the US for the first time in 1995, visiting friends in West Virginia. In 1996 she was accepted as a doctoral student in orchestral conducting at the University of Colorado at Boulder (CU), studying with orchestra conductor Theodore Kuchar, opera conductor Robert Spillman, and choral conductor Joan Catoni Conlon. While at CU, McGuire conducted the orchestra and opera company and sang with the University Singers. She also conducted the professional Boulder Philharmonic orchestra and several local community organizations.

McGuire graduated with a doctor of musical arts in 2000 and was elected by faculty to Pi Kappa Lambda, the National Music Honors Society. In the same year she was appointed by the San Francisco Gay Men's Chorus (SFGMC) as its first female artistic director and conductor, where she served until the end of 2010. With the SFGMC, the world's first openly gay choral organization, McGuire toured regularly and produced more than a dozen recordings, and she instituted an outreach program that raised more than $450,000 for health service organizations. She conducted the SFGMC at Carnegie Hall, the Kennedy Center and Louise M. Davies Symphony Hall, and worked with such guest artists as Sir Ian McKellen and Carol Channing. For six weeks in 2004, under McGuire's leadership, SFGMC came into international focus singing on the steps of San Francisco City Hall during the historic same-gender marriages temporarily permitted by Mayor Gavin Newsom. McGuire served as part of a global LGBT choral movement, conducting international festival choirs at the Sydney Opera House for the Gay Games in 2002 at Soldier Field for the Gay Games in Chicago in 2006.

I arrived in San Francisco as a classical musician, but I soon found my voice as a social justice advocate. The music was the means by which I could serve as a conduit for 200 men to change hearts and minds in truly meaningful ways. Our goal was to entertain while sharing a message, whether it was celebrating the life of a gay icon, adopting spirituals and sacred music in a queer context, or protesting inequality. My proudest moments occurred in our outreach appearances. Singing for inmates at Vacaville Prison on World AIDS Day, 2003. Visiting Park Day Elementary School in 2002 for the grand finale of an LGBT-themed week; the sixth graders sang to us: "It's Okay to be Gay" (a song they wrote themselves). Touring to towns and cities in central and northern CA, raising awareness and hundreds of thousands of dollars for their health service organizations. And within our own community, helping gay men – physically and emotionally scarred from the ravages of HIV and homophobia – to find a new and courageous voice alongside their stouthearted brothers in the chorus. A pinnacle was the same-gender marriages of 2004: a palpable turning point as spirits were raised and joy abounded in our city for the first time since the horrors of the AIDS pandemic. SFGMC sang "Chapel of Love" on the steps as thousands flocked to city hall. Senator (then Assemblyman) Mark Leno presided over my own marriage under the dome, amid hundreds of reporters from near and far who clamored for stories in a giddy frenzy. San Francisco is a unique global hub for change, and I am proud to have been part of one exciting era

— Kathleen McGuire, 3 April 2013

In 2006 McGuire co-founded GLAM (Gay, Lesbian & Allied Musicians) Youth Choir in San Francisco, and rode her bicycle more than 550 miles from San Francisco to Los Angeles in the annual AIDS LifeCycle fund raiser. McGuire had become a recognized social justice advocate and in 2006 was selected as a grand marshal in the San Francisco LGBT Pride Parade and Celebration.

In 2005 McGuire was also appointed as the principal conductor of the Oakland-based Community Women's Orchestra (CWO), having previously guest conducted its parent organization: The Women's Philharmonic. McGuire led CWO for the next eight years, including commissioning new works and restoring neglected works by women composers. McGuire became a champion for female musicians. She established internships for assistant conductors, and co-founded Strings Attached: an entry-level ensemble for women musicians who were returning to playing or new to their instruments.

Upon leaving the SFGMC in 2010, McGuire founded Singers of the Street (SOS), a choir of people affected by homelessness in San Francisco. The idea came to her from Jonathon Welch, whom she had met a decade earlier. Welch had established such groups in Sydney and Melbourne, Australia. McGuire visited rehearsals of the Choir of Hard Knocks led by Welch in Australia, and was inspired to create something similar in San Francisco. Singers of the Street enabled McGuire to advocate for another part of society in need. Singers of the Street was selected in 2012 to represent the US at the London Olympics festival in a special concert at Convent Garden. Singers of the Street performed via a music video produced by McGuire. In 2013 SOS's music video was selected by the American Prize as a finalist in the choral performance category. McGuire also served for a time as minister of music at the Congregational Church of San Mateo, working alongside Penny Nixon. Nixon and the congregation were also committed to social justice advocacy.

In 2013, McGuire returned to Melbourne, Australia, to assume positions as director of music at Queen's College – The University of Melbourne, music teacher at Brunswick Secondary College, and Co-Artistic Director of the School of Hard Knocks, working alongside Jonathon Welch. In 2017 she was appointed as music director of two Melbourne choirs: The Tudor Choristers and the Star Chorale. In 2016 she commenced as a casual academic in the Faculty of Education and Arts at Australian Catholic University, where she was subsequently promoted to Lecturer in 2019.

== Composing and arranging ==
In tandem with her conducting career, McGuire also established herself as a composer and arranger, with works published by Yelton Rhodes Music, Shawnee Press, Tresona Music and Wirripang. She orchestrated many works for musical theater in Australia in the 1980s and 1990s, and in the US concentrated primarily on choral arrangements including more than one hundred pieces for the SFGMC. Her arrangement of the song "Harriet Tubman" (2008) was JW Pepper's "Editor's Choice" in 2008–2009. Her edition of Gareth Valentine's "AIDS Requiem" was used for the professional recording of the work on the JAY/TER label. In 2014 she composed, in collaboration with Jonathon Welch and Andy Payne, the cantata Street Requiem for those who died on the streets, which was premiered at the Melbourne Recital Centre on June 7, 2014. The work received its United States premiere on January 25, 2015, including soloist mezzo-soprano Frederica von Stade. In 2015 she collaborated with singer-songwriter Christina Green, composing No Excuses! - a song suite for women's choir inspired by the true stories of family violence survivors. The work drew national attention in Australia, featured on an ABC television special and supported by 2015 Australian of the Year Rosie Batty She has been a member of the American Society of Composers, Authors and Publishers (ASCAP) since 1900 and in 2016 was accepted as a member of the Music Arrangers Guild of Australia (MAGA).

== Rock music ==
In her teens, McGuire taught herself bass guitar and played in a garage band with Australian jazz musician John Thorn. In the early 1990s she played professionally with the Marie Wilson Band, including appearances on national TV in Australia. From 2011 to 2013, McGuire played original and cover songs with rock band Critical Bliss in San Francisco, appearing frequently at Martuni's and other Bay Area venues.

== Personal life ==
McGuire came out as a lesbian in her twenties. Several longterm relationships included one with Texan classical pianist and conductor Stephanie Lynne Smith. They shared a public domestic partnership ceremony at San Francisco City Hall in June 2003. They were divorced in 2007 and remain friends and colleagues. McGuire has been in a relationship with Audrie Sexton since May 1, 2014. They were married in 2019.

== Awards and accolades ==
- 1982: Dux of the School (valedictorian), Mentone Girls' Grammar School, Victoria, Australia
- 1991: Best Musical Director Award, Victorian Music Theatre Guild (Australia)
- 1994: Rotary International Ambassadorial Fellowship
- 27 June 2003: Water Bond, awarded by San Francisco City Treasurer Susan Leal
- June 2006: Community grand marshal, San Francisco LGBT Pride Parade and Celebration
- 2006: Influential Person of 2006, San Francisco Bay Times
- 16 August 2004: Certificate of Recognition, California Legislature
- 19 June 2006: Proclamation, San Francisco Mayor Gavin Newsom
- 19 June 2006: Proclamation, San Francisco Board of Supervisors
- 2006, Who's Who in America, Marquis
- 2006, Who's Who of American Women, Marquis
- 2007, Who's Who in the World, Marquis
- 2007: Bay Area Personality, Bay Area Reporter
- 21 May 2008: Certificate of Recognition, California State Assembly
- 2009, Cambridge Who's Who Registry
- 2010: The American Prize for Choral Conducting: Excellence in Music Education Citation
- 2010: KQED Local Hero Award
- 22 April 2010: Mayoral proclamation, "Kathleen McGuire Day", San Francisco, California
- 22 April 2010: California Senate proclamation
- 22 April 2010: Certificate of Recognition, California Senate
- 18 January 2011: Conductor laureate honorary title awarded by the San Francisco Gay Men's Chorus
- 10 January 2012: Profile of Excellence Award, ABC7 TV
- 31 March 2013: Conductor laureate honorary title awarded by the Community Women's Orchestra
- 6 April 2013: Proclamation from State of California awarded by Senator Mark Leno
- 6 April 2013: Certificate of Honor and "Kathleen McGuire Day" awarded by San Francisco Mayor Ed Lee (presented by Bevan Dufty)
- 2 September 2013: The American Prize, Special Judges' Citation for Extraordinary Commitment to the Community Through Music
- 2015: The American Prize in Composition—choral music (professional division) Special Judges' Citation for Street Requiem: "Dignifying the Homeless Through Song"
- 2016: Top of the Class award, School of Hard Knocks, Melbourne, Australia
- 2017: Alumni Achievement Award, The University of Surrey, Guildford, UK
- 2017, Who's Who in the World, Marquis
- 2020: Teaching Development Award, Australian Catholic University

== Discography ==
- 1997: World AIDS Day Benefit Concert Colorado Quilt Chorus – CD
- 1997: St. Aidan's Prayer for Lindisfarne, St. Aidan's Church Choir – CD
- 1998: Five Years For Freedom, The Rainbow Chorus – CD
- 2001: I Dream of a Time, SFGMC – CD
- 2002: SFGMC Does Queen, SFGMC – enhanced CD
- 2004: Oh, Happy Day! SFGMC – CD
- 2004: Closer Than Ever, 25th Anniversary Concert, SFGMC – CD
- 2005: Home for the Holidays – Live at the Castro Theatre, SFGMC – CD
- 2005: Divas' Revenge: Opera & Broadway Our Way, SFGMC, CWO – CD
- 2007: Why We Sing, SFGMC – DVD
- 2008: U.S.S. Metaphor, SFGMC, CWO – DVD
- 2008: Creating Harmony: 30th Season Highlights & New World Waking, SFGMC, CWO
- 2010: Women's Work and Play, Community Women's Orchestra – CD
- 2010: California Freedom Tour 2010, San Francisco Gay Men's Chorus – CD
- 2012: Stand By Me, Singers of the Street – music video
- 2014: Street Requiem, School of Hard Knocks - CD
- 2020: Sing Nowell!, The Tudor Choristers - CD
