= San Francisco Gay Men's Chorus =

World's first openly gay men's chorus, credited with creating the LGBT choral movement

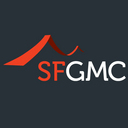

Background information
- Also known as: SFGMC
- Genres: Broadway, choral, classical, jazz, popular
- Occupation: Men's Choir
- Instrument: ca. 300 voices
- Years active: 1978–present
- Members: Artistic Director and Conductor; Jacob Stensberg; Assistant Conductor and Music Director of Homophonics; Mitch Galli; Chief Executive Officer; Chris Verdugo; Principal Accompanist; Danny Sullivan; Music Director of The Lollipop Guild; Paul Saccone
- Past members: SFGMC Alumni Association
- Website: www.sfgmc.org

The San Francisco Gay Men's Chorus (SFGMC) is the world's first openly gay chorus, one of the world's largest male choruses and the group most often credited with creating the LGBT choral movement.

The chorus was founded by gay music pioneer Jon Reed Sims. The group does not require that members identify as gay, bisexual, or male. The eligibility requirements for SFGMC are to be at least 18 years of age, to be able to sing in the Tenor 1, Tenor 2, Baritone or Bass range, and to pass the audition process defined by the Artistic Director. With a membership of over 250, the SFGMC presents a wide range of music and performs for many different kinds of audiences.

== Background ==
=== Early challenges ===
The SFGMC came into existence during the gay rights movement, which rose to national prominence after the Stonewall Riots in New York City in 1969. In 1977, openly gay candidate for San Francisco Supervisor Harvey Milk began traveling around the United States to present what came to be known as the Hope Speech. Speaking as an openly gay elected public official, he urged gay people to come out of the closet to oppose anti-gay efforts such as the Briggs Initiative and Anita Bryant's Save Our Children campaign. Sims responded by forming the San Francisco Gay Freedom Day Marching Band and Twirling Corps, the world's first openly gay and lesbian performing arts group, early in 1978 and the SFGMC later that year. The chorus held its first rehearsal on October 30, 1978.

However, the first public performance of the SFGMC took place exactly four weeks later, on November 27, at an impromptu memorial at San Francisco City Hall for Milk and Mayor George Moscone, who had been assassinated earlier that day by former Supervisor Dan White. The SFGMC performed "Thou, Lord, hast been our refuge" ("Herr Gott, du bist unsre Zuflucht") by Mendelssohn at the event, which was attended by at least 25,000–40,000 mourners who had marched to City Hall from the Castro district, which was represented by Milk in the Board of Supervisors.

Sims, who specialized in conducting bands and orchestras, soon appointed Dick Kramer (1927–2007) as SFGMC conductor. The two men co-directed SFGMC's first official concert, which took place on December 20, 1978, at Everett Middle School, where the 115-voice chorus presented an eclectic program to a capacity crowd.

Despite the precedent set by the band, chorus members debated whether to use the word "gay" in its name:

I remember ... an argument over whether to include the word "gay" in the title. Until the mid to late '70s, any mention of gay was sensationalized and lurid. Gay bashing was tacitly approved. If a gay man called the police about being harassed, they would arrest him.

— Tom Ammiano

Being an openly gay organization presented certain challenges beyond the reluctance of some gay men to join because of the name. In 1981, the SFGMC lost a controversial court battle when Superior Court Judge Ira Brown ruled that the Jesuits at the University of San Francisco could refuse to allow the chorus to sing at St. Ignatius Church. A civil suit several months later awarded damages to the SFGMC.

=== National tour ===
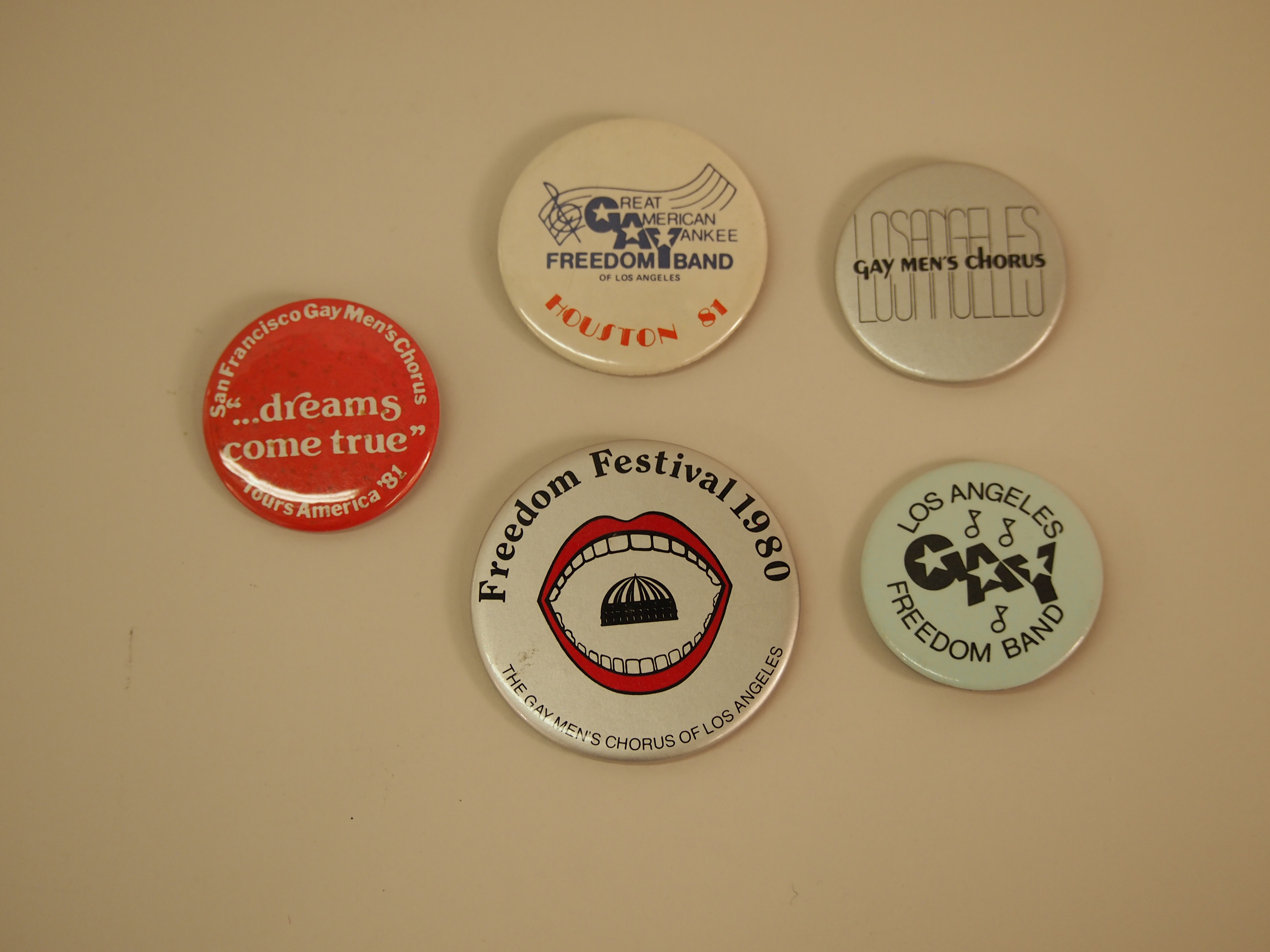
1981 red tour button on left

Musically, the chorus was an instant success. Kramer's commitment to musical excellence was rewarded with many reviews praising the group's ability. That success allowed the chorus to reach out to a wider audience with a 1981 national tour and a companion LP recording, The San Francisco Gay Men's Chorus Tours America 1981. During that tour, the chorus performed in nine cities: Dallas, Minneapolis (Orchestra Hall), Lincoln, Detroit, New York City, Boston, Washington D.C. (Kennedy Center), Seattle (Seattle Opera House), then returned to San Francisco for a triumphant performance at Davies Symphony Hall where San Francisco Mayor Dianne Feinstein awarded SFGMC the key to the city—the first time that honor had been bestowed on a gay organization. Although the tour was a critical and artistic success, it left SFGMC with a debt of US$200,000, which was covered in part by the mortgages on the homes of three members. The final payment on the debt was made in 1991, just a few months short of the tour's tenth anniversary.

=== LGBT choral movement ===
The tour and recording helped spark the formation of many LGBT choruses in the United States and around the world, including the Gay Men's Chorus of Washington, D.C., Boston Gay Men's Chorus, Vancouver Men's Chorus in Canada, and the Melbourne Gay and Lesbian Chorus in Australia. By 1982, choruses were performing in many cities across the US, Canada, Europe (for instance, Stockholms Gaykör, Sweden) and a global LGBT choral movement had begun to take shape. SFGMC founding member Jay Davidson helped create the Gay and Lesbian Association of Choruses (GALA Choruses) and served as its first board president. LGBT singers in other parts of the world created similar organizations, including LEGATO, an association for lesbian and gay choirs and ensembles in Europe established in 1997, and SING OUT! – the Association of Lesbian and Gay Choirs in the UK and Ireland. There are now more than 250 LGBT choruses worldwide.

=== New music ===
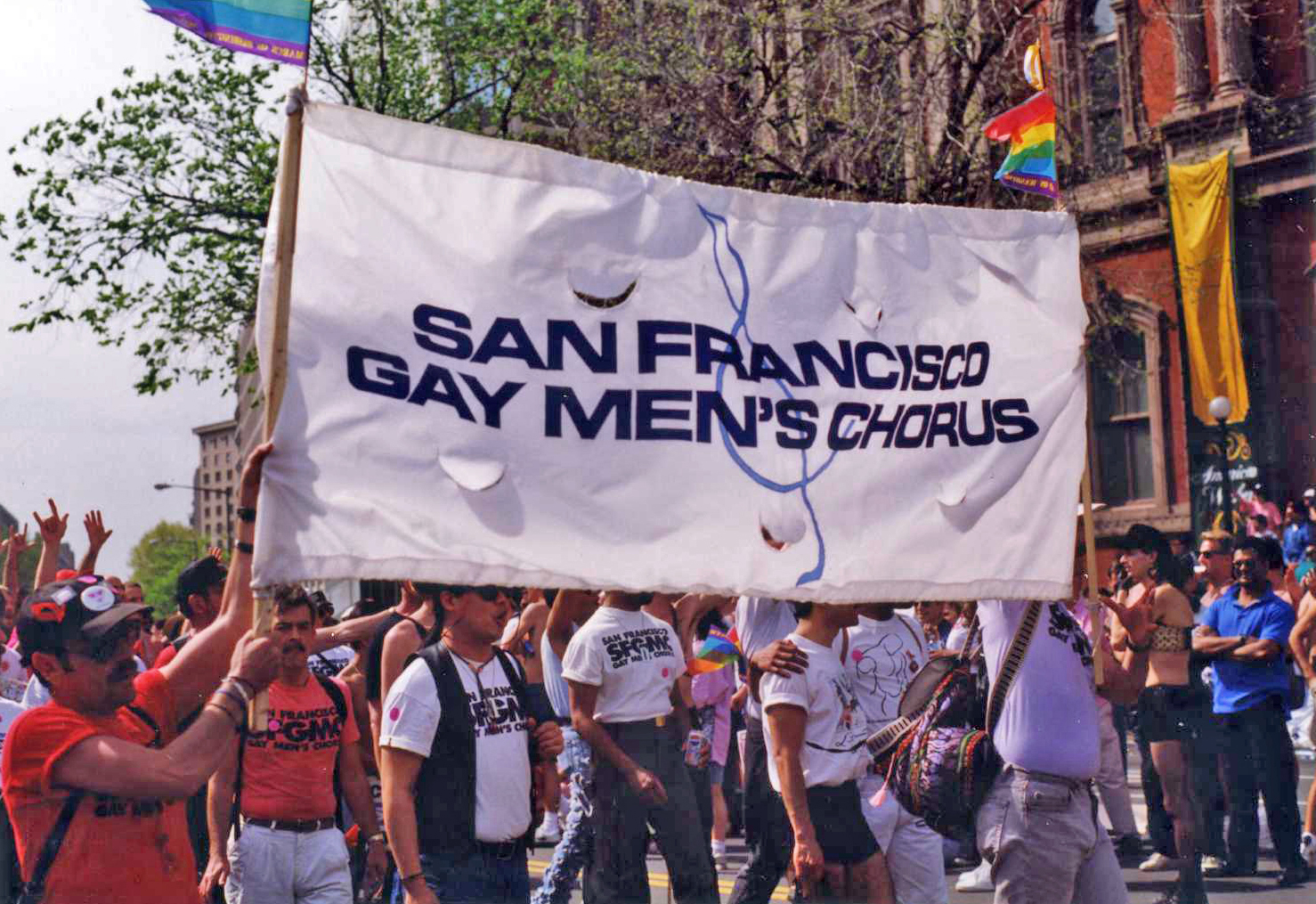
1993 March on Washington for LGB Equal Rights and Liberation

In the late 1970s, gay choral music was virtually nonexistent. Because the SFGMC wanted to perform music relevant to its members and audience, the group commissioned many works, slowly building a new repertoire for men's choruses as well as for the LGBT community. In 1979, SFGMC member Tad Dunlap composed what is possibly the first-ever gay-specific choral piece, "I Understood," with lyrics from one of Harvey Milk's inspirational speeches. The SFGMC's 1986 commission, Invocation and Dance by David Conte, was one of the earliest pieces to deal with AIDS, and is now considered a standard of American TTBB choral literature. NakedMan, a song suite by Philip Littell and Robert Seeley commissioned by the SFGMC in 1996, instantly became one of the most important works in gay choral literature and is still widely performed by LGBT choruses. "Never Ever", the final movement of NakedMan, has found its way into the repertoire of high school and college choirs, especially as a graduation piece. Dr. Stan Hill, SFGMC's conductor from 1989 to 2000, was a driving force behind many commissions. In honor of its 30th anniversary in 2008, the chorus commissioned and performed new works by composers David Conte, Eric Lane Barnes, Ilyas Iliya, L. Peter Deutsch, Libby Larsen, and Steve Schalchlin.

=== Recent commissions ===
In 2011, Stephen Schwartz created Testimony, a choral work using lyrics taken from submissions to Dan Savage's It Gets Better Project. The Chorus premiered Testimony in March 2012, and it has now been performed by several other gay men's choruses.

Also in 2011, the Chorus announced plans to commission a major new work based on the life and legacy of Harvey Milk. The work, entitled I Am Harvey Milk and with music and lyrics by Andrew Lippa, premiered at Nourse Theatre on June 26, 2013—the same day on which the US Supreme Court ruled that Section 4 of DOMA and California Proposition 8 were both unconstitutional. Its Broadway premiere occurred on October 6, 2014.

In its 37th season, the Chorus premiered "New Year's Carol," with music by Ola Gjeilo and words by Charles Anthony Silvestri, and also performed the Bay Area premiere of Jake Heggie's For a Look or a Touch opera.

In March 2014, the Chorus performed the world premiere of Tyler's Suite, dedicated to the memory of Tyler Clementi, a young gay man who died by suicide in 2010 after experiencing bullying. Co-commissioned with several other gay choruses, it features movements composed by Stephen Schwartz, John Corigliano, Jake Heggie, and Ann Hampton Callaway, all set to poetry by Pamela Stewart. Callaway joined the Chorus on stage as a soloist.

In April 2015, the Chorus presented the world premiere of #twitterlieder, a 15-song cycle with music by James Eakin, set to lyrics by Charles Anthony Silvestri. Each song is a 140-character tweet.

=== AIDS ===
From the mid-1980s through the late 1990s, the chorus focused heavily on AIDS because of the huge impact the disease was having on its members and the broader LGBT community.

As AIDS took its toll, chorus members used concerts as a way to bring a sense of urgency to the public. The group's music became more somber and began including AIDS requiems. The chorus also became a place for members to talk openly about HIV and AIDS. Men shared tips on how to get into clinical drug trials and serenaded friends through their last breaths. For men who were fighting for their lives, often alone and estranged from parents who had turned their backs on gay children, the chorus became family.

— Meredith May

Hill describes the era as "the worst of times", explaining that he spent every Wednesday and Sunday visiting members in hospitals. Members and former members who died of AIDS and other causes became known as the chorus's "Fifth Section".

In addition to commissioning and performing AIDS-related music, the chorus participated in and presented concerts and other events to raise awareness and funds for AIDS health service and research organizations. Although SFGMC lost over 250 members to the disease, the organization survived, grew, and continued to exhibit passion for its mission. In 1998, for example, the chorus made its first international appearances in Sydney, Australia.

=== Community outreach ===
By the late 1990s, the chorus had survived the worst of the epidemic and was ready to resume a more active role as ambassador for the LGBT community. In 2000, with the appointment of conductor Dr. Kathleen McGuire, the SFGMC expanded its community outreach. Over the next few years, appearances included: Giving Back concerts, which raised funds for women in 2000, young people in 2002, and breast cancer and AIDS in 2002; the SFGMC's first by-invitation concerts for elementary and high school students in 2002 and 2003; a performance at Vacaville prison for World AIDS Day in 2003; programming to reach out to transgender, African American, and faith-based communities in 2004; participation in Special Olympics events (2003–2005); the addition of a Spanish-language ensemble in 2005; and sponsorship of an LGBT youth chorus in 2006.

After a quarter-century of singing for gay rights, members of the SFGMC finally performed at St. Ignatius Church – this time without controversy – on Jan. 11, 2003, at a memorial for AIDS advocate and SFGMC alumnus, David Smith Fox (1952–2002). This was no minor event, with Nancy Pelosi and other dignitaries among the 600 attendees. In 2018, St. Ignatius Church invited SFGMC to hold its 40th anniversary concert there.

In January 2010, in response to the passage of Proposition 8, SFGMC launched its first California Freedom Tour with sold-out performances in Redding and Chico. To commemorate Harvey Milk's birthday in May, 2010, the chorus performed in Bakersfield and Fresno, and ended the 2010 tour with a trip to Vallejo in July. SFGMC chose these cities because they are parts of California that strongly supported Proposition 8. The second California Freedom Tour, with performances in Bakersfield, Fresno, Redding and Vallejo, took place in April through July 2011. In 2012 also SFGMC traveled to Stockton and Sacramento, California, plus Denver, Colorado and Laramie, Wyoming.

In 2017, in response to anti-gay ballot measures, SFGMC toured seven Southern states. The tour, entitled the Lavender Pen Tour, featured sold-out houses in several cities and became the subject of a 2019 documentary, Gay Chorus Deep South, which was featured at several film festivals and won an Audience Award at the Tribeca Film Festival.

In 2018, SFGMC launched its RHYTHM (Reaching Youth Through Music) program, which sends chorus members on outreach visits to elementary, middle, and high schools throughout the Bay Area.

== Membership ==
Mission: To lead by creating extraordinary music and experiences that build community, inspire activism, and foster compassion at home and around the world.

— SFGMC Mission Statement,

The SFGMC is a non-profit community arts organization made up of singers and non-singers, board members, staff and alumni. The SFGMC's board of directors is officially known as Golden Gate Performing Arts, Inc.

A number of chorus members also participate voluntarily in smaller ensembles, each with fewer than 25 singers. These ensembles represent the chorus at outreach events, hold their own concerts, make recordings, and are featured regularly in concerts with the full chorus. Currently, there are three ensembles: The Lollipop Guild, founded in 1979, and best known for its a cappella and Barbershop singing; Vocal Minority, founded in 2003, which specializes in vocal jazz and show choir repertoire; and SWAG, founded in 2013, which features a more urban sound and aesthetic and tight harmonies from the jazz and R&B genres. A larger, ad hoc group called the Ambassadors also represents the chorus at outreach performances.

According to data gathered by the SFGMC Alumni Association, more than 1,800 men have been chorus members since 1978. Two founding members still sing with the group, along with several others who went on the 1981 tour. Auditions for new SFGMC members are held semi-annually, in January and August. In order to be eligible for membership, singers must pass an audition and be at least 18 years old. Identifying as gay is not a requirement, but members are expected to abide by the organization's mission. While the chorus bylaws originally required members to be male, in 2021 the bylaws were re-written such that the "only requirement is the vocal ability to sing within the traditional tenor and bass vocal ranges", opening choir membership to trans, non-binary, and female singers.

The appellation "Fifth Section" is reserved primarily for former members who died from various causes, including AIDS/HIV. Former Air Force Technical Sergeant Leonard Matlovich, who was never a formal member of the chorus but donated $6000 of his discrimination settlement with the Air Force to the Chorus' 1981 national tour, was inducted into the Fifth Section following his 1989 death from AIDS.

== Performances ==
SFGMC presents an annual subscription concert series that includes holiday concerts in December; a spring concert at Louise M. Davies Symphony Hall — home of the San Francisco Symphony; an Annual Pride Concert with other San Francisco LGBT organizations; plus a concert featuring the chorus's small ensembles and a cabaret featuring its soloists. In addition, one of the most popular of San Francisco's annual holiday events, Home for the Holidays, has been presented by the SFGMC annually since 1990 on Christmas Eve at the historic Castro Theatre.

Through its SingOut Program, SFGMC also makes up to 50 community appearances each year, including ones that directly benefit local nonprofit and healthcare organizations. In recent years, SFGMC has helped to raise more than US$430,000 for organizations such as the AIDS Foundation, AIDS Emergency Fund, STOP AIDS, Face to Face – Sonoma County AIDS Network, Stanislaus Community Assistance Project, Santa Cruz Assistance Project, Napa Solano Health Project, Lyon Martin Women's Health Services, Breast Cancer Fund, American Cancer Society, Special Olympics, Larkin Street Youth Services, Lavender Youth Recreation and Information Center, the Matthew Shepard Foundation, and Make-A-Wish.

== Controversy ==
SFGMC generated controversy when they released a song on YouTube on July 1, 2021 titled "A Message from the Gay Community". The lyrics were by Charlie Sohne and music by Tim Rosser with the chorus featuring lead vocals by Troy Iwata and Daniel Quadrino. The song, a satire of anti-LGBT rhetoric, talked about "converting" children to the gay rights movement, and included lines such as "We're coming for your children", "You won't approve of where they go at night", and "You think that we'll corrupt your kids... Funny, just this once, you're correct". There was a strong negative reaction to the song online from right wing outlets, with TMZ reporting that the group received death threats, and the video was temporarily set to private before being restored on July 9 along with a statement from the group.

== Achievements ==
SFGMC has received many awards and honors, including several Cable Car Awards in the 1980s, official recognitions from San Francisco and California elected officials, the Circles of Hope Award from the Metropolitan Community Foundation in 2003, and Absolutely Fabulous Awards for floats in the San Francisco Pride Parade, most recently in 2011. In 2009, the Chorus was voted "Best Of The Bay" by the San Francisco Bay Guardian in the category "Best Music Organization" in the "Readers Poll – Classics" section. The Chorus is featured in the award-winning documentary films Singing Positive in 1995 (with a sequel in 2009) and Why We Sing in 2006. SFGMC is featured in many recordings (see Discography below), including the 2005 and 2006 winners of the Out Music Awards for Outstanding New Recording: Chorus or Choir for CDs Oh Happy Day! and Home for the Holidays - Live at the Castro Theatre. In June 2007, eMusicUK's Getting Started in Classical Music webpage listed the CD San Francisco Gay Men's Chorus Tours America 1981 as one of 12 essential recordings considered Best of the Best.

SFGMC was heard around the world singing at San Francisco City Hall during the same-gender marriage ceremonies of February and March 2004, including for comedian and talk show host Rosie O'Donnell.

In 2007-2008, supporting efforts to legalise same-sex marriage and to disparage the US military’s “Don’t Ask, Don’t Tell” policy, SFGMC performed in San Francisco and Miami, Florida, and released a DVD of U.S.S. Metaphor or The Lad Who Loved a Sailor, a satirical parody of Gilbert and Sullivan’s HMS Pinafore.

In May, 2008, SFGMC performed the song "Oh, Happy Day" at the 37th Academy of Gospel Music Awards, becoming the first gay chorus to appear at this event. On May 4, 2009, SFGMC ensemble The Lollipop Guild performed at the Various Voices festival in London, marking the organization's debut in Europe.

In June 2014, it was announced that SFGMC's recording of I Am Harvey Milk had won the 13th annual Independent Music Award for Best Soundtrack / Cast Recording.

SFGMC has performed in Australia, Canada and across the United States, in such venues as Carnegie Hall in New York City, Kennedy Center in Washington, D.C., the Sydney Town Hall, Jay Pritzker Pavilion in Chicago and Salle Wilfrid-Pelletier in Montreal. The Chorus has appeared and collaborated with numerous celebrities and arts organizations, including: San Francisco Symphony, Berkeley Symphony Orchestra, San Francisco Opera, Marin Opera, Opera By The Bay (Sausalito), San Francisco Ballet, The Women's Philharmonic, the Community Women's Orchestra, the Bay Area Rainbow Symphony, Holly Near, Deborah Voigt, Lisa Vroman, Carol Channing, Michael Feinstein, Florence Henderson, Nell Carter, Megan Mullally, Sir Ian McKellen, Alan Cumming, Kristin Chenoweth, Sharon Gless, BD Wong, Cris Williamson, Joan Rivers, Nichelle Nichols, Barbara Cook, Julie Newmar, Armistead Maupin, Jennifer Holliday, Stephen Schwartz, Deke Sharon, Mark Etheredge, Beach Blanket Babylon, Matt Alber, Andrew Lippa, Laura Benanti, and Patti LuPone.

SFGMC was invited to Los Angeles in the summer of 2014 as guests of the Gay Men's Chorus of Los Angeles for a combined performance of I Am Harvey Milk at Walt Disney Concert Hall.

In January 2019, the Chorus announced it would purchase the former Baha'i Center at 170 Valencia Street, intending to convert it into the National LGBTQ Center for the Arts.

In June 2019, to mark the 50th anniversary of the Stonewall Riots, sparking the start of the modern LGBTQ rights movement, Queerty named The SFGMC one of the Pride50 trailblazers “who actively ensure society remains moving towards equality, acceptance and dignity for all queer people.

== Leadership: Artistic Directors and Conductors ==
- Jon Reed Sims (Oct. 1978)
- Dick Kramer (Nov. 1978 – Jan. 1982)
- Robin Kay (guest conductor, Feb. – Mar. 1982)
- Robert Erickson, Dale Richard, Claude Zetty (interim conductors, 1982)
- Ernie Veniegas (1982–1984)
- Charles Baker, Dennis Coleman, Vance George (guest conductors, 1985)
- Gregg Tallman (Aug. 1985 – June 1989)
- Dr. Stan Hill (July 1989 – July 2000; Conductor Laureate July 11, 2012)
- Joseph Jennings (guest conductor, Sept. – Dec. 1998)
- Dr. Kathleen McGuire (Aug. 2000 – Dec. 2010; Conductor Laureate Jan. 3, 2011)
- Dr. Timothy Seelig (January 2011 – 2022); also served as guest conductor, Feb. – June 2009)
- Jacob Stensberg (July 2022 – present)

== Discography ==
- Tours America '81 (Golden Gate Records LP 1981, CD 1992)
- How Fair This Place (1991)
- Brahms, Bernstein, & the Boys! (1993)
- Our Gay Apparel (September 1995, December 2003)
- NakedMan (July 1996)
- ExtrABBAganza! (April 1997)
- Q (1998)
- Our Boys Will Shine (1998)
- Misbehavin' with Nell Carter (May 1999)
- Sing Me to Heaven (July 2000)
- Exile (June 2000)
- Best of SFGMC (June 2001)
- I Dream of a Time (November 2001)
- SFGMC Does Queen (June 2002)
- Closer Than Ever, 25th Anniversary Concert (May 2004)
- Oh, Happy Day! (July 2004)
- Home for the Holidays – Live at the Castro Theatre (June 2005)
- Divas' Revenge: Opera & Broadway Our Way (November 2005)
- Cowboys, Boas and Bears! Oh, My! (June 2006)
- Why We Sing (DVD June 2007)
- USS Metaphor (DVD, May 2008)
- Creating Harmony: 30th Season Highlights and New World Waking (double CD, Dec. 2008)
- A Few Licks (February 2009)
- Tune In, Turn Up, Sing Out (June 2009)
- California Freedom Tour 2010 (May 2010)
- Words (April 2011)
- Testimony (March 2012)
- Enchantingly Wicked (June 2012)
- I Am Harvey Milk (October 2013)
- Illuminate: Live at 35 including "Tyler's Suite" (June 2014)
- Passion including Jake Heggie's "For a Look or a Touch" (July 2015)
- Festive: Four Years of Favorites including "New Year's Carol" (October 2015)
- 40 (October 2017)
- Unbreakable (February 2019)

For more information, see catalogue at the SF Gay Men's Chorus official website.

== See also ==
- Moscone–Milk assassinations
- San Francisco 2004 same-sex weddings
- Timeline of HIV/AIDS
- LGBT culture in San Francisco
