= Melbourne Gay and Lesbian Chorus =

Gay choir in Australia

- Also known as: MGLC
- Origin: Melbourne, Australia
- Genres: Broadway, choral, classical, jazz, popular
- Occupation: Choir
- Instrument: ca. 100 voices
- Years active: 1990–present
- Members: Musical Director; Stephanie Teh; Assistant Musical Directors; Emily Cook; Ben Lee shOUT Youth Chorus Musical Director; Alex Gorbatov shOUT Youth Chorus Musical Director; Lam Nguyen-Hoang; Emily Whisson
- Website: www.melbpridechorus.org.au

Melbourne Pride Chorus (MPC), previously known as Melbourne Gay and Lesbian Chorus, was founded in Australia in 1990 by Lawrence McGuire (1966). The chorus was first named 'Alsounds', due to its part affiliation with the foundation. In January 1995, the choir was incorporated as the Melbourne Gay and Lesbian Chorus Inc, reflecting the chorus's organizational independence and a desire to further challenge stereotypes.

== Background ==
=== Gay Choirs in Australia ===
The first gay choir in Australia was Human Nature, an all-male, Sydney-based chorus. It began in 1981, and disbanded c. 1997. McGuire, unaware of the Sydney group, learned of the existence of gay choruses while listening to an LP record, The San Francisco Gay Men's Chorus Tours America 1981, at a party. Inspired by the discovery, McGuire, along with his roommates (including his sister, Kathleen McGuire, and gay friend Tuck Wah Leong), discussed the notion of forming a gay and lesbian choir in Melbourne. McGuire wanted to form a choir specifically with gay men and women in an effort to unify these sometimes-divergent groups. AIDS had already caused much devastation in the gay community, and he believed that a choir would help to lift spirits and be a positive expression against homophobia. With a small group of men and women, both gay and straight, the first rehearsal was held on April 28, 1990, at St Luke's Anglican Church in South Melbourne.

Sydney Gay and Lesbian Choir (SGLC) began less than a year later in January 1991, independent of the Melbourne chorus. Rob Holland founded SGLC in response to the lack of Australian representation in the Cultural Festival of the Vancouver Gay Games, held in August 1990.

Since then, many choirs with an LGBT focus have formed in Australia and also in New Zealand:

==== Chronology of gay choirs in Australia and New Zealand ====
- Gay Liberation Quire (men's), Sydney (1981–1987)
- Melbourne Gay & Lesbian Chorus, founded in 1990
- Sydney Gay and Lesbian Choir, founded in 1991
- Gay & Lesbian Singers (GALS) Auckland, founded in 1992
- Canberra Gay and Lesbian Qwire, founded in 1993
- Gay and Lesbian Singers of Western Australia (GALSWA), founded in 1993
- Adelaide Gay & Lesbian Singers (1996–1999)
- Brisbane Pride Choir, founded in 1998
- Adelaide Gay & Lesbian Qwire, founded in 2001
- shOUT Youth Chorus (formerly Melbourne Gay & Lesbian Youth Chorus), founded in 2005
- Cairns Out Loud Lesbian & Gay Choir, founded 2007
- Homophones, gay men's chorus in Wellington (2007–2011)
- LOW REZ Melbourne Male Choir, founded in 2008
- Glamaphones (mixed chorus), Wellington, founded in 2011
- QTas – Tasmania's LGBTIQ Choir, founded in 2013
- True Colours Chorus, Darwin, founded in 2018

=== Conductors ===
MGLC's first musical director was Trevor Dunn. Dunn, who was a music teacher at Kilbreda College, a Catholic girls' high school in Mentone, directed the group for a number of years before succumbing to AIDS in 1992.

Following a series of short-term conductors, Tuck Wah Leong took the helm as musical director in about 1994 and directed the MGLC's award-winning first CD and its first international tour.

In 2001, MGLC appointed conductor Adrian Kirk, under whose direction the chorus developed a more sophisticated, classical sound.

Jonathon Welch AM – of the renowned operatic trio Tenor Australis, and former conductor of the Sydney Gay and Lesbian Choir – served as MGLC's musical director from 2005 to 2007.

Darren Wicks was the musical director for 2008.

In 2009, Adrian Schultz, the director of the Youth Chorus, was appointed musical director and served until July 2013. Subsequently, he served as guest conductor of the Youth Chorus for the Christmas concert in 2014 and on multiple occasions since.

Ben Leske was appointed musical director of the Melbourne Gay and Lesbian Youth Chorus (now known as shOUT) in 2009 and led the Youth Chorus until early 2015, for its first major performance, The Sound of Youth (2010), and during a period of significant growth in its membership. In November 2017, Ben graduated with a Ph.D. in Music Therapy from the University of Melbourne. The focus of the Ph.D. was choir leadership, inspired by his interest in the well-being of members of the Melbourne Gay and Lesbian Youth Chorus.

Dr Kathleen McGuire served as interim musical director in 2009 and then served as musical director from 2013 to 2015. She also conducted MGLC at Trevor Dunn's memorial service in 1992 and at several annual AIDS memorial services at St Mark's Anglican Church in the early 1990s.

Drew Downing was appointed as musical director in 2015.

Stephanie Teh, longtime member and assistant musical director from 2011 to 2020, was appointed musical director in 2021.

=== Community involvement ===
Since its inception, the MGLC has provided support and outreach to the GLBTI community. Examples of regular community appearances include: World AIDS Day ceremonies and services for the People Living With AIDS; Midsumma Pride March and performances at the Victorian Pride Centre. MGLC are also regular participants in the Out and Loud Choral Festival.

=== shOUT Youth Chorus ===
In August 2005, MGLC founded the Melbourne Gay and Lesbian Youth Chorus, the first chorus of its kind in Australasia.

The inaugural Youth Chorus musical director was Gudula Kinzler.

Gudula, a German citizen, was in Australia for a few years and has now returned to Germany, where she is the musical director of Die Rheintochter, a mixed women's choir, based in Cologne, Germany.

They perform their own major stand-alone performances and also join with the main chorus at numerous events.

They recorded their first CD, Count Me In, in 2008.

In November 2015, MGLYC formally changed its name to shOUT Youth Chorus. The members felt that it was important to re-brand in such a way that recognizes the Youth Chorus's inclusion of people of diverse genders and sexualities.

The stated mission of shOUT is to support and engage young people from diverse backgrounds.

== Achievements ==
=== Awards ===
- 1st Prize, Community Choir Section, Boroondara Eisteddfod, 1995
- Best Choir Award, Australian National Festival of the Voice, 1996
- Rainbow Award, Best Live Performance, 2004
- Rainbow Award, Best Live Performance, 2005
- Rainbow Award, Best New Community Event for Youth Chorus's debut concert, 2006
- Best Choir Sing, Sing For Good, 2015
- Best Choir Sing, Sing For Good, 2016

=== Touring ===
- 1998, August: European tour to Frankfurt, Freiberg Vienna, and Amsterdam for Gay Games
- 1996, February: Sydney Gay and Lesbian Mardi Gras
- 2000: Our Family concert, Canberra
- 2001: Adelaide Lesbian & Gay Cultural Festival
- 2002, November: Gay Games in Sydney, Australia
- 2006, July: Gay Games in Chicago, and OutGames in Montreal
- 2013, July: Festival of Voices in Hobart, Tasmania
- 2016, February: Out and Loud Festival in Auckland, New Zealand
- 2019 October: Out and Loud Festival in Canberra, Australian Capital Territory
- 2023 February: Out and Loud and Proud, Sydney

=== Performance highlights ===
- 1990: First concert: Steppin' Out, Caulfield Town Hall
- 1995: Qantas 75th birthday, Melbourne Zoo
- 1998, 5 August: Gay Games Choir Festival, Concertgebouw, Amsterdam
- 1999, 27, 28 March: Let’s Misbehave concert, Newton Theater, Sydney
- 2002, 7 November: Sing Out to the World concert, Sydney Opera House
- 2002: Virgin Megastore opening with Sir Richard Branson, South Yarra
- 2003, 24 February: concert with Seattle Men's Chorus and Ann Hampton Callaway, Melbourne Town Hall
- 2006, 2 March: concert with Jimmy Somerville, Justice Michael Kirby, Bob Downe and Eddie Perfect at Hamer Hall
- 2006, 19 July: Gay Games choral concert, Jay Pritzker Pavilion, Chicago
- 2007, 15 & 16 September: On Broadway, Malvern Town Hall
- 2010: The Sound of Youth (inaugural Youth Chorus concert), Gasworks Theatre
- 2012, 13 October: Rainbow Dreaming – songs of Australia, St Mark's Church Fitzroy
- 2012, 8 December: Hallelujah It's The Chorus, St Mark's Church Fitzroy
- 2013, 20 July: Out in the Spotlight – songs of stage and screen, Preston Town Hall
- 2014, 5 October: No Place I'd Rather Be, Methodist Ladies College, Kew
- 2015, 15 August: Celebrate 25 (25th anniversary concert), St Kilda Town Hall
- 2015, 17 October: Not So Quiet – A rainbow reunion (10th anniversary Youth Chorus concert), Fitzroy Town Hall
- 2016, 20 February: Out and Loud Choral Festival, Auckland
- 2016, 18 June: Jukebox – Swinging songs of the 50s and 60s, Clocktower Centre Moonee Ponds
- 2016, 14–16 July: Dolly Diamond's Christmas in July, The Melba Spiegeltent Collingwood
- 2016, 15 October: Rodgers+Hart+Hammerstein – The sublime music of Richard Rodgers, Lorenz Hart and Oscar Hammerstein II, Church of All Nations (Melbourne)
- 2016, 10 December: Summer Sing Fling – A collaboration of Summer and Christmas music with Low Rez Male Choir, shOUT Youth Chorus, and The Decibelles Female Pop Choir, Metropolitan Meat Market Melbourne

== Affiliations ==
MGLC is an affiliate member of the Gay and Lesbian Association of Choruses (GALA Choruses) and a member of the Australian National Choral Association.

== Discography ==
- Four Songs (Cassette Tape) (1995)
- Kaleidoscope (CD – MGLC001) (1996)
- MGLC Meets Queerfloten (CD – Live recording from Freiberg, Germany) (1996)
- Inflight (CD – MGLC004 – Live recording at James Tatoulis Auditorium, Methodist Ladies College, Kew) (1998)
- Walk on By (CD – MGLC005) (2002)
- Evolution (CD) (2006 – MGLC006)
- Feelin' Groovy (CD – MGLC007) (2006)
- Count Me In (Youth Chorus) (CD) (2008)
- Hallelujah! It's The Chorus (CD – Live recording at St Mark's Anglican Church, Fitzroy) (2013)
