= The Choir of Hard Knocks =

Australian choir

Choir of Hard Knocks
- Origin: Melbourne, Victoria, Australia
- Genres: Pop rock; classical
- Years active: 2006–present
- Spinoffs: Choir of Hope and Inspiration
- Past members: Jonathon Welch

The Choir of Hard Knocks is an Australian choir.

== History ==
The Choir of Hard Knocks was the brainchild of Jason Stephens of FremantleMedia Australia in conjunction with the charity Reclink, a not for profit community organisation that provides sport and arts opportunities to those experiencing social and economic disadvantage. Their name references the phrase, school of hard knocks: learning by experiencing life, not through classrooms. Jonathon Welch, a former tenor with Opera Australia who had previously developed a similar choir, the Sydney Street Choir, was cast as the choir master.

Stephens began his TV career as a comic writer and performer in D Generation in 1986-1987. Welch had studied the Montreal Homeless Men's Choir in late 1999 and established a choir of homeless people for a TV project – the Sydney Street Choir – in 2001. Stephens and his organisation, FremantleMedia Australia, created the ABC TV five-part documentary series, Choir of Hard Knocks, after pitching the idea to chronicle the formation and progress of a choir in Melbourne. In 2005 Stephens had also learnt of the Montreal group and convinced Welch to participate in the documentary as music director and choirmaster.

The funding organisation behind the choir was managed by RecLink, which subsequently expanded its choir program nationally and later supported eight similar choirs around Australia including the Transformers, Choir of High Hopes Hobart, Sydney Street Choir and the Rocky Road Choir.

Recruiting was by word of mouth and through community organisations with rehearsals beginning in September 2006. The original ensemble had 47 members. Welch canvassed other charities for funding and support to advertise the choir's first rehearsal. After six weeks of rehearsals, their premiere performance occurred in October 2016. Bridget McManus of The Age, observed, "the timing might not have been perfect, the soloist was a little shaky, and a wild-haired man at the back had a tendency to echo the last word of every line, but the infectious enthusiasm of the group belting out 'Blame It on the Boogie' – in unison, with all the actions – was hard to ignore. At the front of the group, by the Flinders Street Station steps, stood a spirited conductor on whom all singers' eyes were fixed despite the peak-hour bustle." As at May 2007, the choir had about 50 members.

The choir raised money, initially, to record a CD single for promotion and individual sales, through busking in city streets. They also held a fund-raising concert at the Melbourne Town Hall on 7 March 2007. For that performance they were supported by Melbourne Gay and Lesbian Chorus and by the Sydney Street Choir. Weekly broadcasts of the TV series commenced in early May 2007. The Choir of Hard Knocks later performed at the Sydney Opera House, which was broadcast in a second series as Choir of Hard Knocks Opera House Special in November.

A self-titled companion CD to the first series, Choir of Hard Knocks: the Voice of RecLink, was released on 26 May 2007 containing traditional songs, "Amazing Grace" and "Silent Night" and cover versions of pop rock tracks, "Flame Trees" (originally by Cold Chisel) and "Hallelujah" (Leonard Cohen). Seven tracks were recorded at Sing Sing Studios, Richmond, nine tracks were recorded live from their first Melbourne Town Hall concert. It was each and every member's first experience in a recording studio. The album peaked at No. 21 on the ARIA Albums Chart and remained in the top 50 for 16 weeks. At the end of that year it was certified as a platinum record for shipment of 70,000 units. It appeared at No. 3 on ARIA's End of Year Charts – Top 50 Classical Albums 2007 and No. 46 on the next year's chart.

An associated DVD of the same name was issued in August 2007 and became the second highest selling Australian documentary DVD for that year. Their second album, Songs of Hope and Inspiration was released on 7 December 2007, which reached No. 39. By the end of the following year it was certified gold for shipment of 35,000 copies. It appeared at No. 9 on ARIA's End of Year Charts – Top 50 Classical Albums 2007 and No. 43 in the following year. The DVD of the second series, Choir of Hard Knocks: Opera House Special, was issued in November 2008.

== Television show ==
In 2005 FremantleMedia Australia producer Jason Stephens brought the idea of a television series called the Choir of Hard Knocks to the Australian Broadcasting Corporation. In an interview on Australian Story by the Australian Broadcasting Corporation, Stephens said "I'd always been quite fascinated by choirs. Living in Melbourne during that time 2005 the homelessness problem was more obvious, I guess. And I kind of thought it would be interesting to put those two ideas together to see if we could make a choir out of homeless and disadvantaged people." The ABC and Fremantle chose Reclink, a charity that had worked with homeless people in the past, as the charity that would work with the television construct and cast the choir conductor Jonathon Welch.

The five-part Australian Broadcasting Corporation documentary TV series of the same name, broadcast weekly from May 2007 and released two albums, Choir of Hard Knocks: the Voice of RecLink (26 May 2007), which peaked at No. 21 on the ARIA Albums Chart, and Songs of Hope and Inspiration (7 December 2007), which reached No. 39. A DVD of the series also titled, Choir of Hard Knocks: the Voice of RecLink, was issued in August. A second series in November 2007 followed the choir members preparing for a concert at the Sydney Opera House. In April 2009 the choir was replaced by the Choir of Hope and Inspiration after a falling-out between Welch and RecLink.

== Choir of Hope and Inspiration ==
Following a split between RecLink and Welch in March 2009, the latter formed a new not-for-profit entity, the Melbourne Street Choir, Inc (MSC). Supported by a pro bono committee of management (board), MSC focussed on a new choir and delivered a greater level of transparency and accountability to choir members in relation to all of its activities. Many members of the original choir followed Welch to the MSC which recommenced public performances from 29 April 2009 at the Melbourne International Jazz Festival. On 21 May Welch launched the Choir of Hope and Inspiration with a training choir, the Morning Bell Choir (named due to their training sessions beginning early in the day), while the main choir was established as the Choir of Pride & Joy.

== Discography ==
=== Studio albums ===
List of studio albums, with selected chart positions and certifications
Title	Album details	Peak chart positions	Certifications
Title	Album details	AUS	Certifications
The Choir of Hard Knocks	Released: May 2007; Label: ABC Classic (4766166); Formats: CD, digital download	21	ARIA: Platinum
Songs of Hope and Inspiration	Released: December 2007; Label: ABC Classic (4766347); Formats: CD, digital download	39	ARIA: Gold

== Awards and nominations ==
=== ARIA Awards ===
The ARIA Music Awards is an annual awards ceremony that recognises excellence, innovation, and achievement across all genres of Australian music.

Year	Award	Work	Result	Ref.
2007	Best Original Soundtrack, Cast or Show Album	Choir of Hard Knocks	Won	

=== Logie Awards ===
At the Logie Awards of 2008, the first TV series won Most Outstanding Factual Series and was nominated for Most Popular Factual Program. At the 8th Helpmann Awards in July 2008 their appearance at the Sydney Opera House, Choir of Hard Knocks: Live in Concert, won Best Special Event.
