= Diana Steiner =

Diana Steiner, (Diana Steiner Dickstein) is an American professional violinist. She was born in 1932 in Portland, Oregon. She was the violin solo winner of the Walter W. Naumburg Foundation Violin Competition in1952. Her New York recital debut was reviewed by the New York Times.

She received her Bachelor of Music degree in 1949 from the Curtis Institute of Music. Steiner received her masters studying with Jascha Heifetz at USC Thornton School of Music. Steiner recorded a LP record of music by Ernst von Dohnányi and Jean Sibelius with pianist David Berfield. In 1976 © Baroque Records™ a division of 43 North Broadway, LLC. Another LP released was "Great Music for Violin Lovers". In 1950, she performed the Mendelssohn Violin Concerto as soloist with the Boston Symphony.

Her younger sister Frances Steiner, born 1937, is a well-known professional cellist and conductor. Her daughter, Marcia Dickstein, is an active harpist in the Los Angeles area.

Ms.Steiner has published several music compilations and written a book entitled "Mother Started It". The book is about the three generations of classical musicians in her family. Her mother, Elizabeth Levy Steiner; Diana and her sister, Frances Steiner; and Diana's daughter, Marcia Dickstein. It includes vignettes of the famous musicians that crossed their lives, including Efrem Zimbalist, violinist; Gregor Piatigorsky, cellist; Jascha Heifetz, violinist; Nadia Boulanger, composer and pedagogue; Leonard Bernstein, conductor and composer, and Mehli Mehta, conductor.
