= The Women's Philharmonic =

The Women's Philharmonic (TWP)
- Orchestra
- Founded: 1981
- Disbanded: 2004
- Location: San Francisco, California

The Women's Philharmonic (TWP) was a San Francisco-based, professional orchestra founded by Miriam Abrams, Elizabeth Seja Min and Nan Washburn in 1981 and disbanded in 2004.

== History ==
Originally known as the Bay Area Women's Philharmonic, in 1998, the orchestra's repertoire consisted almost entirely of works by more than 150 women, including more than 130 premiere performances and more than 40 commissions. A partial list of TWP's repertoire, compiled by Women's Philharmonic Advocacy, includes 283 works. TWP's mission was "to change the face of what is played in every concert hall by incorporating works by women composers into the orchestral repertoire." TWP's long list of accomplishments includes multiple awards for Adventurous Programming from ASCAP and the American Symphony Orchestra League.

The Women's Philharmonic received funding from the Ford Foundation, Rockefeller Foundation, National Endowment for the Arts, the San Francisco Arts Commission, and the Women's Foundation of San Francisco. Insufficient funds to meet programmatic needs was central to the closure of the orchestra in 2004.

In 2008, Women's Philharmonic Advocacy was formed "in order to recognize the achievement of The Women's Philharmonic (1980-2004) over their 24 years of activity, to build on this work by advocating for the performance of women composers by orchestras and ensembles, to address the place of women composers (historic and contemporary) in today's repertoire of orchestras and ensembles in the US and internationally, and to present information that highlights the shortage of programming of works by women; the heritage of The Women's Philharmonic emphasizes that this should and can be corrected."

The philharmonic continues in existence as the Community Women's Orchestra, which was initially founded in 1985 by Nan Washburn as an adjunct to The Women's Philharmonic.

== Leadership ==
=== Music directors ===
- Elizabeth Seja Min (music director, 1981–1985)
- Nan Washburn (artistic director and associate conductor, 1981–1990)
- JoAnn Falletta (music director, 1986–1997)
- Apo Hsu (music director, 1997–2003)

=== Guest conductors ===
- Sebrina Alfonso
- Gisele Ben-Dor
- Sarah Caldwell
- Ann Krinitsky
- J. Karla Lemon
- Jadine Louie
- Anne Manson
- Marsha Mabrey
- Kathleen McGuire
- Frances Steiner

== Recordings ==
- Baroquen Treasures (Newport Classic, 1990)
- The Women's Philharmonic: Mendelssohn, Schumann (1993, Koch International Classics 7169, reissued 2008)
- Uses of Music in Uttermost Parts: Music by Elinor Armer, Text by Ursula K. Le Guin (1995, Koch International Classics)
- The Music of Chen Yi (1996, New Albion Records)
- The Music of Florence Price (2001, Koch International Classics 7518, reissued 2008)
