= Gay Chorus Deep South =

- Directed by: David Charles Rodrigues
- Written by: Jeff Seymann Gilbert, David Charles Rodrigues
- Produced by: Bud Johnston, Jesse Moss
- Starring: San Francisco Gay Men's Chorus, Oakland Interfaith Gospel Choir
- Edited by: Jeff Gilbert
- Music by: Bryan Senti
- Release date: April 29, 2019 (Tribeca Film Festival)
- Running time: 100 minutes
- Country: United States
- Language: English

Gay Chorus Deep South is a 2019 documentary about the San Francisco Gay Men's Chorus and the Oakland Interfaith Gospel Choir's October 2017 tour in Mississippi, Tennessee, Alabama and the Carolinas. It aired on MTV in the United States in December 2019. It was produced by Airbnb.

== Critical reception ==
Gay Chorus Deep South has received very positive reviews from critics. As of October 2021, 100% of the 23 reviews compiled on Rotten Tomatoes were positive, with an average rating of 8/10.

Reviewing it for The Los Angeles Times, Gary Goldstein wrote, "it's heartening to see greater openness to LGBTQ+ folks than outsiders might expect", but he suggested the film should have "dug more deeply and aggressively into the virulent religious and political forces that have enabled Southern inhospitality toward LGBTQ+ and other diverse groups to persist."

In Variety, Peter Debrudge opined, "There's a lesson here that applies to more than just LGBT political causes: To heal the country and move on, we must reach across the divide and listen to one another. And what better way to do that than with a concert?"

For Dan Callahan of TheWrap, "There are the expected clichés voiced here about how music can transform hearts and minds, but Gay Chorus Deep South is most useful as a way of seeing how intolerance hides behind evasive Southern hospitality and how it might be vanquished with what that hospitality seeks to avoid: direct confrontation."
