= Community Women's Orchestra =

- Short name: CWO
- Founded: 1985
- Location: Oakland, California
- Principal conductor: Samantha Burgess
- Website: communitywomensorchestra.org

The Community Women's Orchestra (CWO), based in Oakland, California, was founded by conductor Nan Washburn in 1985 as a community project adjunct to The Women's Philharmonic (TWP), a now-defunct, professional orchestra.

Part of CWO's original purpose was to explore orchestral music by women composers for TWP. Today, CWO is an independent and growing entity. It continues to focus on encouraging women in music, and includes at least one work by a woman composer on each of its programs. An assistant conductor is appointed annually in an effort to create more opportunities for women conductors, and Strings Attached – an entry-level ensemble – encourages the participation of women instrumentalists of varying abilities.

In addition to its own concert season of three full concerts and a chamber music event, CWO appeared at four concerts at Louise M. Davies Symphony Hall as guests of the San Francisco Gay Men's Chorus (SFGMC), 2005–2008. Also in 2008, the CWO toured to Miami, Florida, to perform at the quadrennial GALA Choruses Festival.

== Women's music ==
The CWO has been responsible for numerous regional, national, and world premieres of works by women composers, including Juliette Folville and Dame Ethel Smyth. In its 25th season (2009–2010), the CWO commissioned and premiered three new works by composers Martha Stoddard, Hilary Tann, and Mary Watkins, and premiered a newly orchestrated work by June Bonacich. CWO was the first contemporary orchestra to play Fanny Mendelssohn's Overture in C, when conductor JoAnn Falletta was in the process of reconstructing the work.

Dana Sadava was selected as CWO's new musical director for the 30th anniversary season. Sadava served as assistant conductor during the 2007–2008 season. Her recent engagements include Wexford Festival Opera, the Boulder Chamber Orchestra, Pensacola Opera, Indianapolis Opera, the new music ensemble Zero Blue, and Banff Opera as Theatre, where she was a faculty member of the opera training program. She has been featured in master classes with Marin Alsop, Michael Tilson Thomas, and Gustav Meier. Sadava has a Bachelor of Science degree from the California Institute of Technology. She subsequently studied conducting with Michael Morgan and Alasdair Neale at the San Francisco Conservatory of Music, and with Kenneth Kiesler at the University of Michigan.

== Recordings ==
The CWO appears on several recordings with the SFGMC, and in 2010 released its first self-produced CD, featuring commissioned works in honor of the orchestra's 25th anniversary.

== Discography ==
- Divas' Revenge: Opera & Broadway Our Way (SFGMC, November 2005)
- USS Metaphor (SFGMC DVD, May 2008)
- Creating Harmony: 30th Season Highlights and New World Waking (SFGMC double CD, December 2008)
- Women's Work and Play – 25th anniversary CD (August, 2010)

== Conductors ==
- Nan Washburn, founder and conductor laureate, 1985–1990
- Ann Krinitsky, conductor laureate, 1990–2001
- Martha Stoddard, interim conductor, 2004–2005
- Dr. Kathleen McGuire, conductor laureate, 2005–2013
- Dana Sadava, conductor 2014–2020
- Martha Stoddard, conductor 2021

=== Assistant conductors ===
- Dana Sadava, 2007–2008
- Jessica Bejarano, 2009; 2012–2013
- Yuchi Chou, 2008–2010
- Sandra I. Noriega, 2010–2011
- Ellen Sanders, 2014–2015

=== Guest conductors ===
- Sara Jobin, 1998
- Jessica Bejarano, 2013

=== Strings Attached (ensemble) conductors ===
- June Bonacich, 2010–2012
- Sandra I. Noriega, 2011–2014
