= Robert A. Muh =

American entrepreneur and investor

Robert A. Muh (born January 7, 1938) is an American entrepreneur, investor, economist and philanthropist. He is a board member of Sutter Securities Incorporated, an investment firm in San Francisco, California.

== Early life and career ==
Muh was born on January 7, 1938, and raised on Long Island to immigrant Jewish parents from Germany and Austria. He attended the Massachusetts Institute of Technology (MIT) where he earned a S.B. in Management in 1959. He then went to Columbia University where he earned an MBA and a Master of Philosophy degree in finance. While he was teaching finance at Columbia Business School, he met Berit Spant, a student in operations research at Columbia University Graduate School of Business. They both went to work at McKinsey & Co. and were married in 1968. They have two daughters and three grandchildren.

== Business career ==
Muh served as a 2nd Lieutenant in the U.S. Army before beginning his business career as a management consultant at McKinsey & Co. from 1966 to 1969. He then left to become chairman of a New York Stock Exchange member firm, Newburger, Loeb & Co, Inc. In 1972, Muh joined Bear Stearns & Co. as head of the Los Angeles region corporate finance department. He became a general partner at Bear Stearns in 1982 and served as senior managing director of the San Francisco region from 1984 to 1987. He was President of Financial Services International Inc. from 1987 to 1992. In 1992, Muh co-founded Sutter Securities, Inc., a full-service investment-banking firm headquartered in San Francisco. He served as CEO of Sutter Securities and was president until 2020.

Muh is the former chair of the Financial Industry Regulatory Authority (FINRA) District Committee for Northern California, Northern Nevada and Hawaii; FINRA is the successor to the NASD and is the largest independent regulator for all securities firms doing business in the United States; he served as Chairman of the FINRA Small Firm Advisory Board and he was the Vice Chair of the National Association of Independent Broker/Dealers (NAIBD). In September 2016, Muh was elected to a three-year term on the FINRA Board of Governors.

He has taught as an Adjunct Assistant Professor at Columbia Business School and is a former adjunct professor at the University of San Francisco School of Law. Muh has served as a director of multiple companies including Sizzler International Inc., DayRunner, Inc., SOLA International Inc., Far West Financial, World Wide Restaurants, Dollar Rent-A-Car and Koo Koo Roo, Inc.

== Philanthropy and other interests ==
Muh has founded and endowed the MIT Robert A. Muh Alumni Award in the Humanities, Arts, and Social Sciences to honor MIT graduates for significant achievements in humanities, arts, and social sciences fields. Winners of the Robert A. Muh Award have included former Secretary of State George Shultz, President of Northeastern University Joseph Aoun, Former Kennedy Center President Michael Kaiser cellist Carlos Prieto and Nobel laureate in Economics Robert C. Merton. He maintains a significant involvement with his alma mater, the Massachusetts Institute of Technology (MIT). He holds the distinguished position of Life Member Emeritus within the MIT Corporation and has previously served as the Chair of the Humanities Visiting Committee, and he has served on several of the school's visiting committees including the Sloan School. In 1989, he also established the Muh Family UROP Fund for MIT's Undergraduate Research Opportunities Program "to support research by promising undergraduates in management, economics, or political science".

Muh has served as a trustee and chairman of the Board of the Culinary Institute of America where he has served as co-chair of the school's investment committee, and Muh and his wife helped to establish a New Works Fund at the San Francisco Ballet. Muh served as a trustee and Vice Chair of the Napa Valley Opera House in Napa, CA and the Muhs were major supporters of the Opera House. Muh produced a musical tribute to composer Harry Warren and he has narrated Copland's Lincoln Portrait with the Boston Pops at Symphony Hall in Boston. Muh has been a partner in KMW Farms for more than 40 years. KMW Farms was the breeder of Pine Chip, a trotter that won the Breeders Crown and set the world record for the mile in 1994. The Muhs are also the founders of the Atlas Peak Foundation in support of education and the arts.
