= Adam Stern (conductor) =

American conductor (born 1955)

Adam Oscar Stern (born 1955) is an American conductor. Born in Hollywood, Los Angeles, California, United States, Stern was trained at the California Institute of the Arts in Los Angeles. He received his MFA in conducting in 1977 at the age of twenty-one, the youngest music student in CalArts' history to receive a master's degree.

== Conductor ==
Following years as a freelance conductor, composer and pianist, Stern served as assistant conductor (1992–1996) and associate conductor (1996–2001) of the Seattle Symphony, as well as music director of the Northwest Chamber Orchestra (1993–2000). Stern has guest-conducted throughout the United States, including engagements with the Milwaukee Symphony, the Rochester Philharmonic, the Boulder Philharmonic, Symphonic Wind Ensemble at Michigan State University, the Chamber Music Society of Lincoln Center, Chamber Music Northwest in Portland, the New York Chamber Symphony, Philharmonia Northwest and the Sacramento Symphony. From 2001 to 2005, Stern was the music director and conductor of the Bellevue Youth Symphony Orchestra. From 2005 to 2014, Stern was the music director and conductor of the Port Angeles Symphony, during which tenure he introduced dozens of works to the orchestra's repertoire and was credited with raising its playing standards to unprecedented heights.

He has been the music director of the Seattle Philharmonic Orchestra since 2003, and music director of the Sammamish Symphony Orchestra since 2014. In July 2016 he guest-conducted the "Pops" concert at the Oregon Coast Music Festival, and was named the Festival's permanent associate conductor and "Pops" Conductor a few days later.

A devotee of unjustly neglected works, Stern is particularly noted for his frequent performances of English music, especially that of Ralph Vaughan Williams. He led the first Seattle Symphony performance of Vaughan Williams' Pastoral Symphony in 1996; In January 2007, he and the Seattle Philharmonic presented the Northwest premiere of the same composer's final symphony, No. 9. Stern has also led Seattle, Northwest, West Coast, U. S., and world premieres of works by Alexis Alrich, Elsa Barraine, Caroline Berkenbosch, Louise Bertin, Mélanie Bonis, Nicole Buetti, Aaron Copland, Roque Cordero, Jean Coulthard, Richard Danielpour, Nana Forte, Gina Gillie, Ruth Gipps, Maria Grenfell, Gustav Holst, Helvi Leiviskä, Sky Macklay, Jocelyn Morlock, Karl Nord, Richard Peaslee, Goffredo Petrassi, Gerard Schurmann, Rodion Shchedrin, Paul Stanhope, James Tenney, Aurelio de la Vega, Grace Williams, Isidora Žebeljan, and Bernd Alois Zimmermann.

== Composer ==
Stern's compositions include The Fairy's Gift for narrator and chamber ensemble (available on the Delos label), Partita Concertante for bassoon and wind ensemble, and Fanfare Pastorale, written for the Seattle Philharmonic. He has composed incidental music for numerous dramatic production in Los Angeles and Seattle. His music for the theater includes incidental scores for productions of Richard III, The Winter's Tale, King Lear, The Pillowman, Art and A Christmas Carol. His setting of Hans Christian Andersen's tale The Snow Queen for narrator and string quartet, with text adapted by Marta Zekan, was premiered by the St. Helens String Quartet and Ms. Zekan at a concert of the Seattle Chamber Music Society in February 2014. Spirits of the Dead, a "rhapsody for narrator and orchestra" based on the early poem of Edgar Allan Poe, was premiered in October 2014 with narrator Edmund Stone and the Seattle Philharmonic Orchestra under Stern's direction. Stern's most recent work, Crossroads for string quartet, received its premiere by the Serendipity Quartet on December 18, 2016.

== Record producer ==
Stern was the recording producer for the majority of recordings made by Gerard Schwarz and the Seattle Symphony. Stern won a 1991 Grammy Award for "Classical Producer of the Year".

== Other roles ==
Stern has performed as a pianist in concertos by Bach, Mozart, Haydn and Gershwin, and in chamber music performances of repertoire from the Baroque era to the present day.

In 1980, Stern appeared in the Richard Dreyfuss film The Competition. In 2006, he was The Narrator in staged performances of Igor Stravinsky's L'Histoire du Soldat at the Orcas Island Chamber Music Festival, and in 2015, he returned to Orcas Island as The Reciter in performances of William Walton's Façade conducted by James Paul.

From 2009 through 2015 he was on the faculty at Cornish College of the Arts, where he taught composition, conducting, orchestral repertoire studies and history of film music.

He has conducted the background scores to numerous films, including Runaway Jury, Heist, Thirteen Ghosts, Ghost Rider, Bee Season, Millions, Clifford's Really Big Movie, The Gift and Just Visiting.

Stern was a music copyist for composers Frank Zappa, David Diamond, Gerhard Samuel and Leonard Rosenman.

A lifelong Democrat, Stern has resided in Seattle since 1992.
