= Jonathon Welch =

Jonathon Welch AM
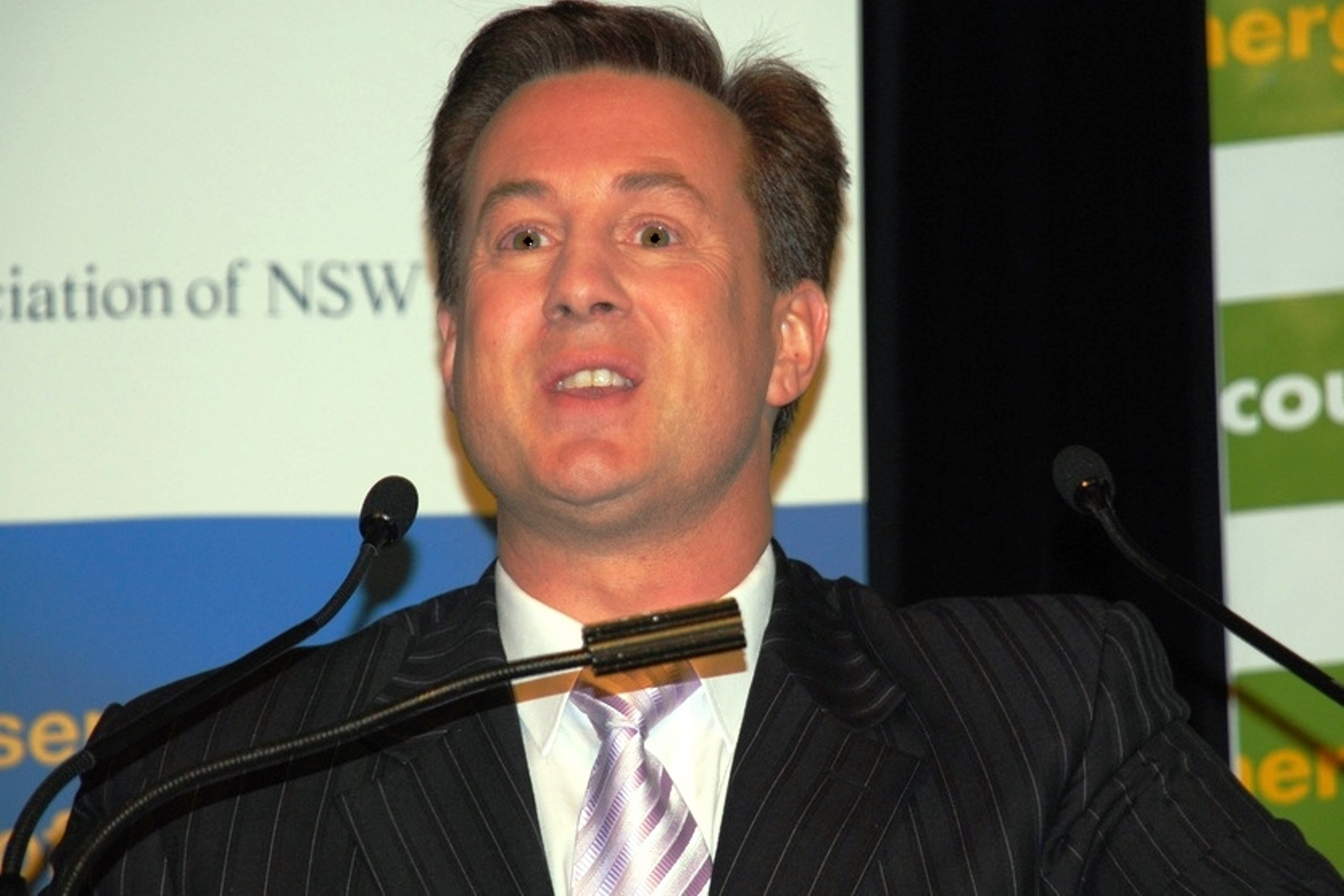
- Jonathon Welch, June 2008

Background information
- Born: 5 October 1958 (age 68); Ripponlea, Victoria, Australia
- Genres: Opera, choral
- Occupations: Tenor singer, choral conductor, voice teacher
- Instruments: Piano, Voice
- Years active: 1965–present
- Website: jonathonwelch.com

Jonathon Charles Welch (born 5 October 1958) is an Australian choral conductor, opera singer and voice teacher. As a singer, Welch has been a tenor for the Victoria State Opera, Lyric Opera of Queensland and Opera Australia.

During 2006 Welch was invited to be the choirmaster for the Fremantle TV production known as The Choir of Hard Knocks comprising homeless and disadvantaged singers from Melbourne. The TV producer was Jason Stephens and the five-part documentary series was televised during mid-2007 on Australian Broadcasting Corporation.

In June 2009 on the Queen's Birthday, Welch was appointed a Member of the Order of Australia with the citation, "For service to the arts as an operatic performer and vocal coach, and to the community as the founder and musical director of the Choir of Hard Knocks". On 1 April that year he had released his autobiography, Choir Man.

== Biography ==
Welch grew up in the Melbourne suburb of Ripponlea. His father, Kenneth Welch, was an engineer born in Sydney to English parents Thomas Archibald and Ella Thrale Welch. His mother, Olive Margaret Hando, was the daughter of Charles and Florence Amelia Hando, farmers from Charlton in rural Victoria. Kenneth and Olive married in 1948 and settled in Melbourne, where Olive worked as a legal secretary. Welch's older sister is Andrea (born c. 1951) and his older brother is Glenn (born c. 1953). They have an adopted younger sister, Elizabeth. Welch attended Ripponlea Primary School. His first job, at eight years old, was selling newspapers directly to motorists. Olive and Andrea sang and played the piano at home, while Kenneth enjoyed listening to opera and Gilbert and Sullivan.

At the age of seven or eight, Welch crafted his first public performance – on the stairs to his school's library – a self-adapted version of Winnie the Pooh and charged his fellow school mates sixpence each. In October 1966 he started piano lessons with Valda Johnstone. As a boy soprano, Welch sang at the local Presbyterian Church, St Margaret's. His parents separated in 1969 and subsequently divorced – the four children remained with Olive. He completed his secondary education at Melbourne High School and commenced a teaching course at Melbourne State College (which later became a faculty of the University of Melbourne).

By 1980 Welch left his teaching course and became a member of the Victoria State Opera chorus as a tenor, making his professional debut in 1981. Olive died of lung cancer when he was 23 years old. He performed in the Victorian State Opera's first production of The Pirates of Penzance (1983). He followed with four years (1984 to 1988) in Brisbane, where he became principal tenor for the Lyric Opera of Queensland while also studying at Queensland Conservatorium of Music. In 1988 Welch joined Opera Australia as a tenor and sang alongside Joan Sutherland at the Sydney Opera House. By 1994 he had founded Tenor Australis with fellow tenor, Gerry Sword. In 1997 he worked with the Sydney Gay and Lesbian Choir and by year's end was their musical director.

At the end of 1999 Welch travelled to Canada for a holiday. While there, he read a magazine article about Montreal's Homeless Men's Choir. In 2001 Welch formed the Sydney Street Choir – to establish a choir of homeless people for a television project. He also formed or has led other choirs including Geelong Pop Choir and Pop Kidz, Australian Pop Choir, and Melbourne Gay and Lesbian Chorus. In 2003 Welch explained his motivation:

Music I think was given to me as a gift. And I believe it was given to me not just for myself but in my ability to perform and teach is to give enjoyment to others. I believe that's why I was put on this earth ... [the Sydney Gay and Lesbian Choir] in many ways were a catalyst for me, making a very big career change from just singing to go back to teaching and conducting. And the joy I got from that really inspired me to go on to create the Street Choir and Pop Kidz and the Australian Pop Choir.

— "The Gift of Song", Compass, 25 December 2003, ABC Television

During 2006 Welch was invited to be the choirmaster for the Choir of Hard Knocks by Jason Stephens It was funded by RecLink, a non-profit charity and welfare organisation. The process of forming the ensemble was televised on Australian Broadcasting Corporation during mid-2007 as a five-part documentary series. Also that year, Welch issued a solo album, With a Song in My Heart on ABC Records.

From June to August 2008 Welch was a judge on TV talent competition, Battle of the Choirs. In March 2009 he had a falling out with RecLink and The Choir of Hard Knocks was replaced by Choir of Hope and Inspiration in April. He also started a new community project, THECHO!R, that year. Welch developed another choir, Voices from the Inside, for the November 2009 TV series, Jail Birds, with female inmates of HM Prison Tarrengower.

In November 2009, Welch created the inaugural national Social Inclusion Week "to connect people, encourage participation and form communities". Social Inclusion Week, held annually since its inception, is in the last week of November each year.

Welch was the music director for the KwaYa Uganda project in September 2012 and April 2013.

Beyond Hard Knocks, a "where are they now" documentary on the journey of the original Choir of Hard Knocks members and their founding director, was released in September 2013 and shown on GEM TV in November 2014.

The inaugural Australian cruise of the performing arts on the MS Radiance of the Seas in November 2014 included Welch as well as, among others, Cheryl Barker, David Hobson, Colin Lane, Teddy Tahu Rhodes, Simon Tedeschi, Elaine Paige, and Marina Prior.

In addition to the information above, Welch has founded:

- Melbourne Festival of Choirs between 2010 and 2012. This became the Melbourne International Singers Festival from 2013. This Festival is held annually over the Queen's Birthday Weekend in June.
- Sing For a Cure, cancer fundraising concert series launched 2011
- School of Hard Knocks, launched September 2012 and now known as Upbeat Arts
- Only Women Aloud, formed September 2012
- Melbourne Eisteddfod, launched in 2013
- Brisbane International Singers Festival in 2016
- Play It Forward in September 2018. Play It Forward provides a unique range of tailored inclusive arts programs, events and projects for all Australians.

Welch finished as artistic director with Choir of Hard Knocks in December 2018, after 13 years in the role. Danielle Matthews and Adam Przewlocki have taken over as the choir's co-artistic directors. Welch is now a Patron of the choir.

In 2020, Welch competed in the television singing competition The Voice. Boy George picked him for his team in the blind auditions where Welch sang "This Is the Moment". He then lost in the battle where he sang "Stand by Me".

== Personal life ==
=== Relationships and family ===
Welch is an openly gay performer, and has led both the Sydney Gay and Lesbian Choir and the Melbourne Gay and Lesbian Chorus. In late December 2000 Welch met his future domestic partner, Matt (an electrical engineer from Orion, Illinois), on the Pacific cruise ship Regal Princess, where Welch was on a working holiday with Tenor Australis providing on-board entertainment. As of September 2007 the pair were living in Yarraville, and had been together for six-and-a-half years.

== Controversies ==
On April 28, 2009, it was reported in The Age that Jonathon Welch decided to break away from Reclink, the very organisation that created the Choir of Hard Knocks TV show. The Age reported that the breakup was a result of “legal action, threats, the expulsion of one member and the suspension of four others, and a very public tiff between Welch and RecLink.” The spokeswoman for the four suspended choir members, Tess Lawrence, stated that their suspension was "devastating" and she was "endeavouring to console them." The Sydney Morning Herald on November 1, 2012, stated that a “few choristers, upset at what they saw as an injustice, sought legal advice and even turned on Welch.”

In July 2021 Jonathan Welch filed documents in the Federal Court of Australia claiming that the stand-up comedy school, School of Hard Knock Knocks, has lost "Mr Welch potential business opportunities and income. The Respondents are deliberately and knowingly using the intellectual property of Mr Welch for their own commercial gain.”. The respondent has since "lodged a counterclaim, saying that Welch's School of Hard Knocks is in itself a breach of Fremantle Media's trademark for the Choir of Hard Knocks." The matter did not go to court, but rather settled with a deed of settlement.

In September, 2021 Paulien George of the Voices of Casey challenged Jonathon Welch's registration of Voices of Casey Choir with ASIC at the Administrative Appeals Tribunal (AAT). During the first hearing, Senior Member Anne O’Connell raised that Play It Forward is not a registered charity with the Australian Charities and Not-For-Profit Commission (ACNC). Jonathon Welch later apologised for "any confusion over whether his Play It Forward musical education company, which he has referred to as a charity, is in fact a registered charity."

On September 21, 2021, Senior Member Anne O’Connell held a hearing in Jonathon Welch's absence asking him to provide written submissions explaining why he “should not be referred to the Legal Services Commissioner and the Attorney-General for making legal threats in the middle of tribunal proceeding” against Paulien George. Welch later lost the case on October 8, 2021, with the AAT Senior Member Professor Ann O'Connell ruling that "Welch's Play It Forward musical education business could no longer use the Voices of Casey Choir name." Jonathon Welch also withdrew his trademark application for 'Voices of Casey' saying that because of the "damaging media attention the Voices of Casey name and brand has now received, we are choosing to focus our energy where it should be, on the singers, and withdraw our trademark application as the goodwill it (the name) once had, has been irrevocably tarnished.”

At the beginning of 2024 Jonathon Welch took action for the second time in the Federal Court against "comedy training outfit the Hard Knock Knocks Comedy School and its founder Morry Morgan" alleging that Morgan did not honour an earlier deed of settlement and rebranding undertakings." The case, however, was delayed due to Jonathon Welch's "long-standing" lawyer, Stuart Gibson, suddenly taking leave days before the mediation.

== Awards and accolades ==
In 1999 Welch won the Australasian Choral Championships at the City of Sydney Eisteddfod. South Sydney Council, in 2002, presented him with a community services award. Welch was the 2008 winner of the Australian Local Hero Award – a part of the Australian of the Year awards. The award was in recognition of his work with The Choir of Hard Knocks. The National Australia Day Council stated that he had "touched the heart of the nation when he demonstrated the power of singing in building and renewing promising lives that had been saddened and defeated by circumstance". Also in 2008 Welch was awarded an honorary doctorate from Griffith University.

=== Mo Awards ===
The Australian Entertainment Mo Awards (commonly known informally as the Mo Awards), were annual Australian entertainment industry awards. They recognise achievements in live entertainment in Australia from 1975 to 2016. Jonathon Welch won one award in that time.

Year	Nominee / work	Award	Result (wins only)
2006	Jonathon Welch	John Campbell Fellowship Award	Won

== Honours ==
In June 2009 on the Queen's Birthday he was appointed a Member of the Order of Australia with the citation, "For service to the arts as an operatic performer and vocal coach, and to the community as the founder and musical director of the Choir of Hard Knocks".

== Bibliography ==
- Welch, Jonathon; Mundell, Meg (1 April 2009). Choir Man. Pymble, New South Wales: HarperCollins. ISBN 978-0-7322-8762-7.
