= Nana Forte =

Slovenian composer

Nana Forte (born September 24, 1981) is a Slovenian composer. She was born in Zagorje ob Savi, Slovenia.

In 2005, Forte graduated in composition from the Music Academy in Ljubljana under Marko Mihevc. She continued her postgraduate studies at Hochschule für Musik Carl Maria von Weber in Dresden under Lothar Voigtländer from 2005 to 2007 and in Berlin at the Universität der Künste under Walter Zimmermann (2007–09).

Her works include compositions for solo instruments, chamber music, orchestral music and pieces for choir. Forte is one of the few young Slovenian composers who are composing much choral music. While studying she worked with many Slovenian choirs and conductors and was awarded a number of prizes for her choral compositions.

Her compositions have been performed in concerts and festivals all over the Europe, including Young Euro Classic (DE), Weimarer Frühjahrstage (DE), Music Biennale Zagreb (CRO), Festival Bemus (SRB), Klara Festival (BE), Festival Emilia Romagna (I), Festival Semanas de Musica do Estoril (PT), Festival LES VOIXS DU PRIEURE (FR), Biennale of Contemporary Music Koper (SI), Ljubljana Festival (SI) and Festival Slowind (SI), and have been broadcast by various European classical music radio stations. Some of her pieces have been published and recorded.

In 2007, she was chosen to represent the Republic of Slovenia in the project "European Ensemble Academy", organized by the Deutscher Musikrat on the occasion of the German presidency of the European Union. Her piece Pritrkavanje, written for a chamber ensemble specially for this event, has been performed in Dortmund, Bremen, Ljubljana, Rome and Brussels.

In August 2007, her orchestral composition Genesis was performed at the festival of Young Euro Classic in Berlin with the Music Academy Orchestra Ljubljana with conductor George Pehlivanian and soloists Jože Kotar (clarinet) and Borut Zagoranski (accordion). In the same year she also presented her piece for choir Libera me at the Music Biennale Zagreb in Croatia.

Her piece Libera me for two mixed choirs was the obligatory piece at the finals of the 5th International Competition for Young Choral Conductors Europa Cantat in Ljubljana in 2009 and was performed by many Slovenian and European choirs.

In May 2010, her composition V lovljenju besed med izštevanjem tišine (Searching for Words while Counting out Silence) for flute and soprano was awarded first prize at the Second Biennale of Contemporary Music in Koper, Slovenia.

Her recent notable project was MusmA 2011 (Music Masters on Air), a cooperation of ten festivals in partnership with their ten radio stations, where she represented Slovenia and won the first prize. For this occasion she was commissioned a new piece for piano solo. The composition A broken car was performed in six European music festivals in Belgium, Italy, Serbia, Portugal, Hungary and Slovenia.
