= Portland Choir & Orchestra =

The Portland Choir & Orchestra (formerly the Portland Ensign Choir & Orchestra) is a non-profit community choir and orchestra in Portland, Oregon.

The Portland Choir & Orchestra has performed with various guest artists, including Grammy nominated and acclaimed concert violinist Jenny Oaks Baker, Broadway performer Dallyn Vail Bailes, and Mormon Tabernacle Organist Clay Christiansen. The choir has performed the National Anthem for several Portland Trail Blazers games at the Moda Center.

== See also ==
- Culture of Portland, Oregon
