= Frances Steiner =

American musician

- Born: February 25, 1937 (age 89)
- Education: Temple University; Harvard University; University of Southern California
- Occupation: conductor
- Spouse: Mervin I. Tarlow
- Children: Sarah Leah Tarlow
- Parents: Ferenz Joseph Steiner (father); Elizabeth Levy (mother)
- Relatives: Diana Steiner (older sister)

Frances Steiner (born February 25, 1937) is an American conductor, cellist and professor emeritus. Steiner is known for her advocacy of American music, especially works by women and African Americans, and for her expertise in 18th century performance practices. She has directed a number of world and West coast premieres of composers such as Ellen Zwilich, George Walker, and Augusta Read Thomas. She is currently the music director of the Chamber Orchestra of the South Bay in Los Angeles.

== Early life and education ==
Steiner's father, Ferenz Joseph Steiner, was a Hungarian cellist who emigrated to the United States in 1908. After living in both New York and Detroit, he moved to Los Angeles. It was the era when films were made without scores, and Ferenz Joseph found work in a Hollywood movie house orchestra. He later moved to Portland, Oregon where he became the Principal Cellist of the Portland Symphony Orchestra and married Elizabeth Levy. Their first daughter, Diana Steiner, was a child prodigy who won a scholarship in violin to the Curtis Institute of Music. Diana's scholarship to Curtis prompted the family's move to Philadelphia, Pennsylvania. Diana Steiner subsequently followed with a career as a violinist.

In 1945, Frances followed in the footsteps of her older sister, by winning a cello scholarship to Curtis. At the age of 13, Steiner appeared as a cello soloist with the Philadelphia Orchestra.

Steiner won a cello scholarship to the Curtis Institute of Music at the age of eight, making her the youngest cellist ever to be admitted to Curtis. The same year, the Philadelphia Orchestra selected her composition for performance in its Children's Concert Series.^{[7]} At age 16, she took a required course in choral conducting at Temple University and found herself smitten with the discipline. Steiner studied composition with Walter Piston and Randall Thompson, cello with Gregor Piatigorsky and Leonard Rose, and conducting with Elaine Brown (conductor) and Nadia Boulanger. At 18, she earned a B.S. in education from Temple University. Degrees from Curtis (B.A.-- Music), Radcliffe College/Harvard University (M.A.-- Music) and the University of Southern California (D.M.A.-- Cello and Conducting) followed.

== Career ==
Steiner's multi-faceted career has included recitals and chamber music concerts at Town Hall (New York) and the Kennedy Center (Washington, DC); the Assistant Principal Chair of the Los Angeles Chamber Orchestra and principal cellist chairs with the California Chamber Symphony, Glendale Symphony, and Festival Orchestra at Lincoln Center; solo cello appearances with the Glendale Symphony and the Philadelphia Orchestra. The conductors that she has worked with include Leopold Stokowski, Carmen Dragon, Daniel Lewis, and Neville Marriner.

In 1974, Steiner became the music director of the Chamber Orchestra of the South Bay (formerly the Baroque Consortium Chamber Orchestra), a post she still holds today; making Steiner the longest-serving music director in the history of the orchestra. Steiner served a 31-year tenure as the music director of the Carson-Dominguez Hills Symphony Orchestra (1977–2008). In addition, she succeeded Hans Lampl to serve as the music director of the Compton Civic Symphony from 1974 to 1978.

At a time when women were not accepted into the ranks of many major symphony orchestras, Steiner's pursuit of a career in conducting seemed impossible, Barbara Jepson wrote in Feminist Art Journal. In 1974, when Steiner became the music director of the Compton Civic Symphony, she was one of only four women in the United States to hold such a post. Three years later, in 1977, she became the first woman to conduct a professional orchestra from the stage of the Dorothy Chandler Pavilion of the Los Angeles Music Center. In the same year Steiner conducted at the Dorothy Chandler Pavilion, the 146 conductors of the major symphony, regional and metropolitan orchestras in the United States and Canada were all male.

On the international stage, she was the first woman to conduct the National Symphony Orchestra of the Dominican Republic, the first woman to conduct the Sofia Chamber Orchestra in Russia, and the first American woman to conduct the Maracaibo Symphony in Venezuela. She has been a guest conductor with a number of orchestras, including, the Wisconsin Chamber Orchestra, The Long Beach Symphony, the Oakland Symphony, and the Bay Area Women's Philharmonic.

== Awards ==
Steiner has received a number of awards, including the Conductors Guild Prize in the American Conductors’ Competition (1978), the Mu Phi Epsilon Professional Music Fraternity's Elizabeth Mathias Award (1998) and Award of Merit (2003), and the Outstanding Professor Award at California State University, Dominguez Hills (1991). In addition, the Chamber Orchestra of the South Bay has been awarded several NEA grants, and the Carson-Dominguez Hills Symphony was honored with the Arts and Humanities Award of the National Recreation and Park Association, Southwest Regional Council (1988).

== Private life ==
In 1965, Frances Steiner married an attorney, Mervin I. Tarlow. In 1975, she gave birth to a daughter, Sarah Leah Tarlow, also an attorney.

== Recordings ==
- Steiner-Berfield Trio: Beethoven’s Trio, Opus 36 (after Symphony No. 2), Diana Steiner, Violin, Frances Steiner, Cello, David Berfield, Piano, Orion Records 1977
- Sonatas for Cello and Piano by Paul Hindemith, Frances Steiner, Cello, David Berfield, Piano, Orion Records 1973

== Publications ==
- Six Minuets for Two Cellos by Joseph Haydn, edited and arranged by Frances J. Steiner, Boosey and Hawkes 1967
- Musicianship for the Classroom Teacher, by Max Kaplan and Frances Steiner, Rand-McNally 1966
