= Seattle Philharmonic Orchestra =

- Origin: Seattle, Washington, USA
- Genre: Classical music
- Years active: 1944—
- Members: Music director Adam Stern
- Website: http://www.seattlephil.org/

The Seattle Philharmonic Orchestra, hosted in Benaroya Hall in Seattle, Washington, United States, is a member-controlled orchestra founded in 1944.

The orchestra performs a minimum of four subscription concerts per season, in addition to outreach concerts and collaborations with other artistic organizations. Under the current (2003–present) music director Adam Stern, the philharmonic presents a broad spectrum of orchestral music, from standard repertoire to local, West Coast, U.S. and world premieres.
