= List of women composers by birth date =

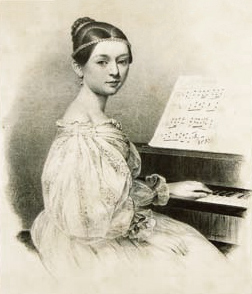
19th-century composer and pianist Clara Schumann.

Women composers of Western classical music are disproportionately absent from the music textbooks and concert programs that constitute the patriarchical Western canon, even though many women have composed music. (Note: Print sources include the Norton/Grove Dictionary of Women Composers, edited by Julie Anne Sadie and Rhian Samuel (New York; London: W. W. Norton, c.1995), Barbara Garvey Jackson, "Say Can You Deny Me": A Guide to Surviving Music by Women from the 16th Through the 18th Centuries (Fayetteville: University of Arkansas Press, 1994), and Aaron I. Cohen, International Encyclopedia of Women Composers (New York: Books & Music, 1987).)

The reasons for women's absence are various. The musicologist Marcia Citron writing in 1990 noted that many works of musical history and anthologies of music had very few, or sometimes no, references to and examples of music written by women. Among the reasons for historical under-representation of women composers Citron has adduced problems of access to musical education and to the male hierarchy of the musical establishment (performers, conductors, impresarios etc.); condescending attitudes of male reviewers, and their association of women composers with "salon music" rather than music of the concert platform; and denial of female creativity in the arts by philosophers such as Jean-Jacques Rousseau and Immanuel Kant. All this needs to be considered in the perspective of restrictions against women's advancement in cultural, economic and political spheres over a long historical period.

Since such discrimination against women composers can be considered in the context of general societal attitudes about gender or perceived roles of men and women, many musicologists and critics have come to incorporate gender studies in assessing the history and practice of the art.

Some notable Western composers include: Hildegard von Bingen (1098–1179), a German Benedictine abbess, writer, composer, philosopher, Christian mystic, visionary, and polymath; Fanny Hensel (1805–1847); Clara Schumann (1819–1896); Ethel Smyth (1858–1944); Amy Beach (1867–1944); Rebecca Clarke (1886–1979); Germaine Tailleferre (1892–1983); Lili Boulanger (1893–1918); Sofia Gubaidulina (1931–2025); Kaija Saariaho (1952–2023); and Judith Weir (born 1954 and the first woman to hold the office of Master of the King's Music).

Women composers are also listed alphabetically at List of women composers by name.

== Before 16th century ==
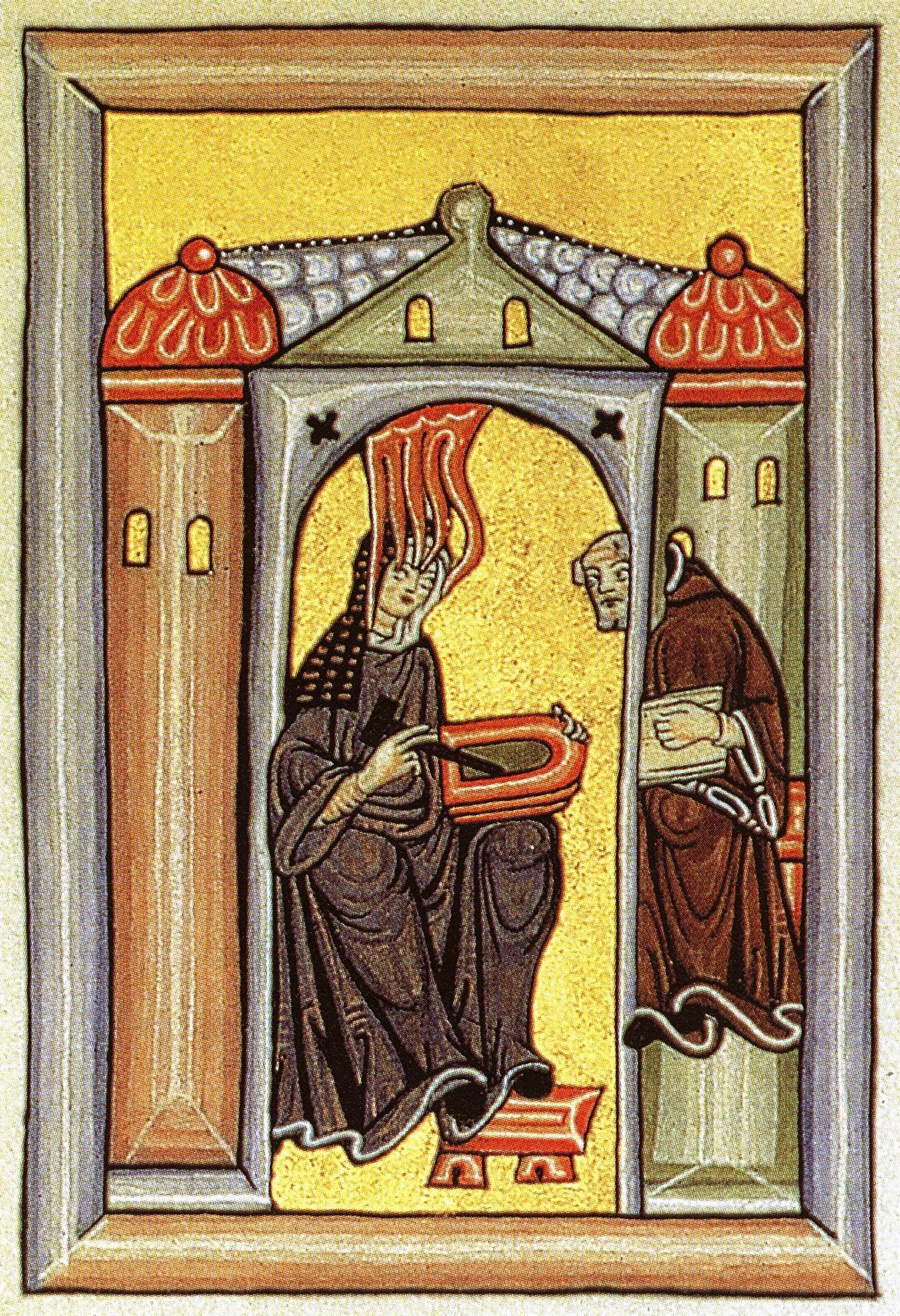
Illumination from Hildegard's Scivias (1151) showing her receiving a vision and dictating to teacher Volmar

- Kassia (c.810 – c.865)
- Hildegard of Bingen (1098–1179)
- Herrad of Landsberg (c.1130–1195)
- Azalais de Porcairagues (fl. mid-12th century)
- Iseut de Capio (c.1140–?)
- Tibors de Sarenom (fl. mid-12th century)
- Marie de France (1175?–1225?)
- Alamanda de Castelnau (fl. second half of 12th century)
- Maria de Ventadorn (fl. late 12th century)
- Beatritz de Dia (fl. late 12th/early 13th centuries)
- Blanche of Castile (1188–1252)
- Castelloza (fl. early 13th century)
- Dame Margot (fl. 13th century)
- Gertrude of Dagsburg (fl. 13th century)
- Maroie de Dregnau de Lille (fl. 13th century)
- Dame Maroie (fl. 13th century)
- Sainte des Prez (fl. 13th century)
- Lorete (fl. 13th century)
- Garsenda de Proensa (fl. early 13th century)
- Birgitta of Sweden (c.1303 – c.1373)

== 16th century ==
- Clementine de Bourges (unknown date – 1561)
- Gaspara Stampa (1523–1554)
- Maddalena Casulana (c. 1540 – c. 1590)
- Paola Massarenghi (fl. 1565–1585)
- Lucia Quinciani (born c. 1566, fl. 1611)
- Claudia Sessa (c. 1570 – between 1613 and 1619)
- Cesarina Ricci de Tingoli (born c. 1573, fl. 1597)
- Vittoria Aleotti (c.1575–after 1620)
- Sulpitia Cesis (1577–after 1619)
- Adriana Basile (c. 1580 – c. 1640)
- Francesca Caccini (1587–1640?)
- Caterina Assandra (c. 1590–after 1618)
- Alba Trissina (c. 1590–after 1638)
- Lucrezia Orsina Vizzana (1590–1662)
- Settimia Caccini (1591–1638?)
- Claudia Rusca (1593–1676)

== 17th century ==
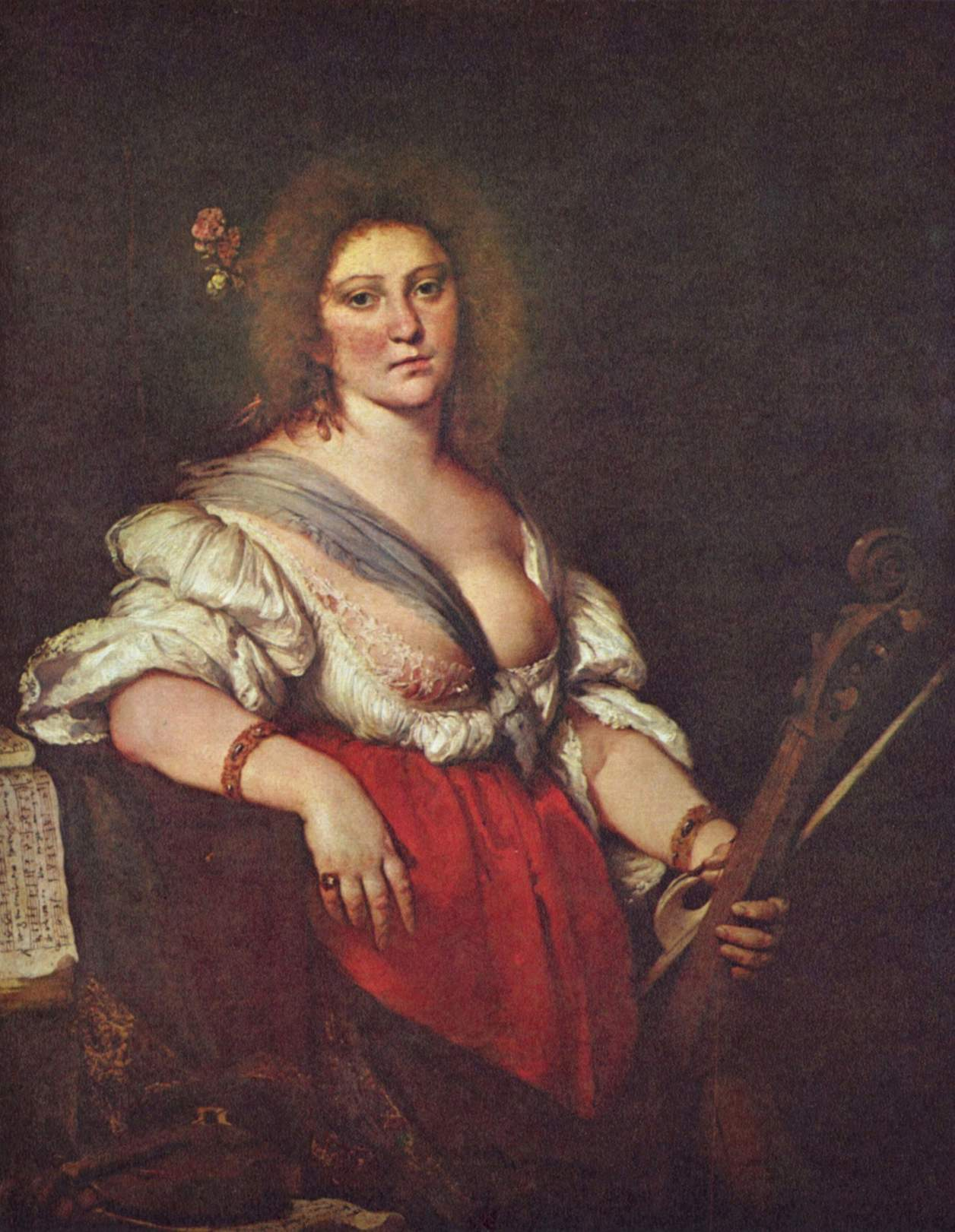
Barbara Strozzi, sometime between c. 1730–1740

- Chiara Margarita Cozzolani (1602–1678)
- Leonora Duarte (1610–1678)
- Leonora Baroni (1611–1670)
- Sophie Elisabeth, Duchess of Brunswick-Lüneburg (1613–1676)
- Francesca Campana (c. 1615–1665)
- Barbara Strozzi (1619–1677)
- Isabella Leonarda (1620–1704)
- Mlle Bocquet (early 17th century–after 1660)
- Lady Mary Dering (1629–1704)
- Maria Francesca Nascinbeni (c. 1640–1680)
- Esther Elizabeth Velkiers (1640–after 1685)
- Countess Amalia Catharina of Waldeck (1640–1697)
- Antonia Bembo (c. 1640–c. 1720)
- Maria Cattarina Calegari (1644–1675)
- Marieta Morosina Priuli (fl. 1665)
- Mme Sicard (fl.1678)
- Rosa Giacinta Badalla (1660–1710)
- Angiola Teresa Moratori Scanabecchi (1662–1708)
- Élisabeth Jacquet de La Guerre (1665–1729)
- Françoise-Charlotte de Senneterre Ménétou (1679–1745)
- Maria Anna de Raschenau (fl. 1690s–1703)
- Anna Maria della Pietà (c. 1696–1782)
- Michielina della Pietà (fl. c. 1701–1744)
- Caterina Benedicta Grazianini (fl. 1705–15 [b.ca.1685])
- Camilla de Rossi (fl. 1707–1710)
- Julie Pinel (fl. 1710–1737)
- Maria Margherita Grimani (fl. 1713–1718 [b.ca.1690])
- Mrs Philarmonica (fl. 1715)
- Marie-Anne-Catherine Quinault (1695–1791)

== 1701–1750 ==
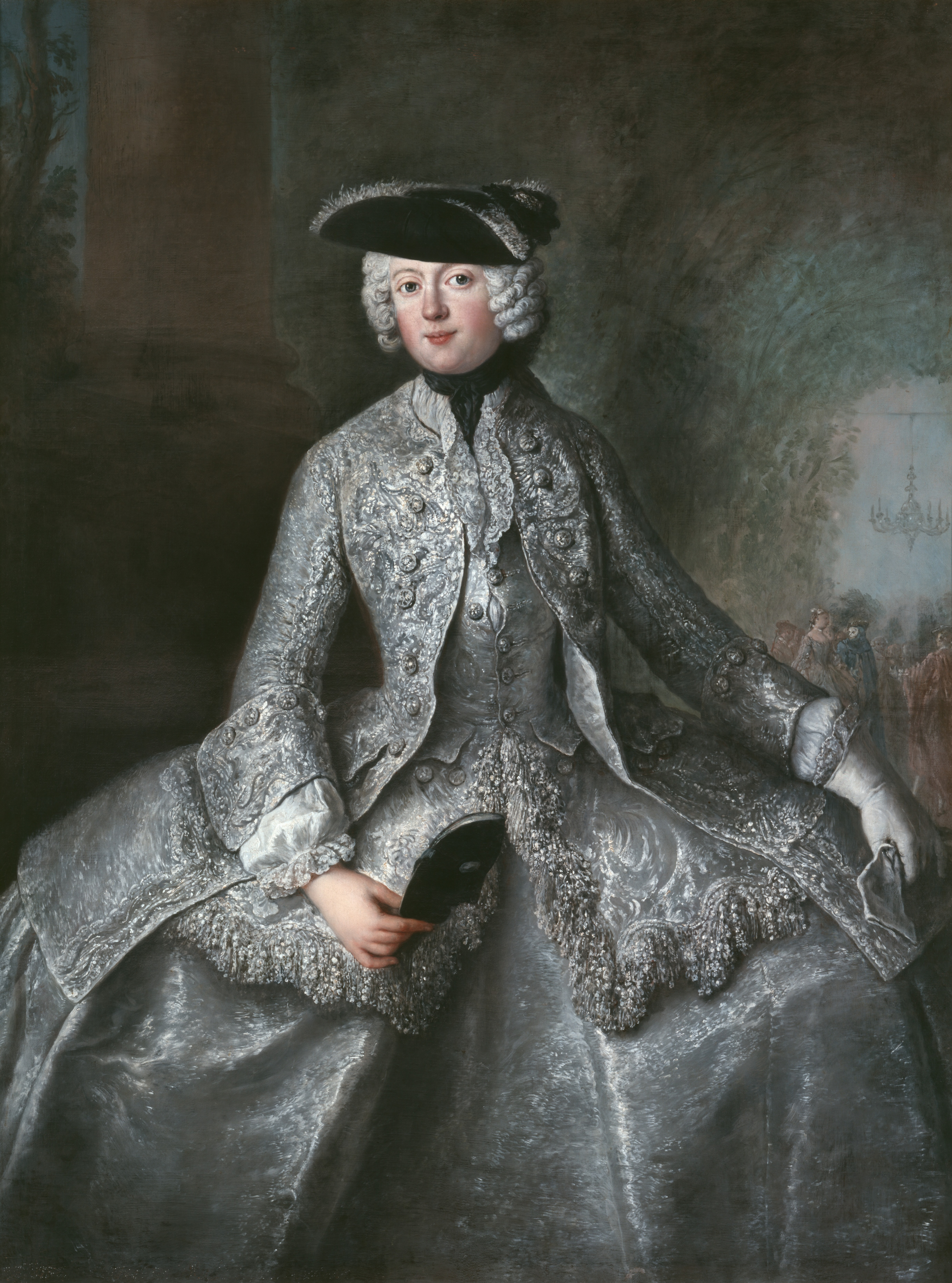
Princess Anna Amalia of Prussia

- Rosanna Scalfi Marcello (1704 or 1705–after 1742)
- Zanetta Farussi (1707–1776)
- Wilhelmine of Bayreuth (1709–1758)
- Mlle Guédon de Presles (early 18th century–1754)
- Barbara of Portugal (1711–1758)
- Agata Della Pietà (1712–1769)
- Luise Adelgunda Gottsched (1713–1762)
- Santa della Pietà (c. 1715?–after 1774) (fl. c. 1725–1750)
- Philippine Charlotte of Prussia (1716–1801)
- Mlle Duval (1718–after 1775)
- Elisabeth de Haulteterre (c. 1720?–after 1768) (fl. 1737–1768)
- Maria Teresa Agnesi (1720–1795)
- Anna Amalia of Prussia (1723–1787)
- Maria Antonia of Bavaria (1724–1780)
- Diamante Medaglia Faini (1724–1770)
- Miss Davis (c. 1726–after 1755)
- Elisabetta de Gambarini (1731–1765)
- Josina van Aerssen (Baroness Boetzelaer) (1733–1787)
- Mme Papavoine (born c. 1735, fl. 1755–61)
- Hélène-Louise Demars (b. c. 1736)
- Anna Bon (born 1738–1739)
- Anna Amalia, Duchess of Saxe-Weimar-Eisenach (1739–1807)
- Mlle Guerin (born c. 1739, fl. 1755)
- Isabelle de Charrière (Belle van Zuylen) (1740–1805)
- Elisabeth Olin (1740–1828)
- Maria Carolina Wolf (1742–1820)
- Anne Louise Brillon de Jouy, née Boyvin d'Hardancourt (1744–1824)
- Marianna von Martines (1744–1812)
- Maddalena Laura Sirmen (1745–1818)
- Marie Emmanuelle Bayon Louis (1746–1825)
- Genovieffa Ravissa de Turin (1745/50–1807)
- Henriette Adélaïde Villard de Beaumesnil (1748–1813)
- Gertrud Elisabeth Mara (1749–1833)
- Polly Young, or Maria Barthélemon (1749–1799)
- Elizabeth Anspach (1750–1828)
- Elizabeth Joanetta Catherine von Hagen (1750–1809/10)

== 1751–1800 ==
- Maria Anna Mozart (1751–1829)
- Corona Elisabeth Wilhelmine Schröter (1751–1802)
- Juliane Reichardt (Juliane Benda) (1752–1783)
- Jane Savage (1752/3–1824)
- Jeanne Renee de Bombelles (1753–1828)
- Charlotte von Brandenstein (1754–1813)
- Josepha Duschek (1754–1824)
- Maria Theresia Ahlefeldt (1755–1810)
- Francesca Lebrun (1756–1791)
- Georgiana Cavendish, Duchess of Devonshire (1757–1806)
- Charlotte Caroline Wilhelmine Bachmann (1757–1817)
- Harriett Abrams (1758–1821)
- Josepha Barbara Auernhammer (1758–1820)
- Marianna von Auenbrugger (1759–1782)
- Marie-Elizabeth Cléry (1759–1809)
- Maria Rosa Coccia (1759–1833)
- Maria Theresia von Paradis (1759–1824)
- Sophia Maria Westenholz (1759–1838)
- Christina Charlotta Cederström (1760–1832)
- Katerina Maier (c. 1760–after 1800)
- Maria Hester Park, (1760–1813)
- Madame Ronssecy (fl. 1780–1800)
- Dorothea Jordan (1761–1816)
- Yekaterina Sinyavina (1761–1784)
- Adelheid Maria Eichner (1762–1787)
- Jane Mary Guest (c. 1762–1846)
- Ann Valentine (1762–1842)
- Anna Maria Crouch (1763–1805)
- Anna von Schaden (1763–1834)
- Helene de Montgeroult (1764–1836)
- Charlotte Wilhelmina Franziska Brandes (1765–1788)
- Elizabeth Billington (1765–1818)
- Jeanne-Hippolyte Devismes (1765–?1834)
- Magdalene Stirling (1765–1846)
- Anne-Marie Krumpholtz (1766–1813)
- Harriet Wainwright (c. 1766–1843)
- Caroline Wuiet (1766–1835)
- Cecilia Maria Barthélemon (1767–1859)
- Julie Candeille (1767–1834)
- Margarethe Danzi (1768–1800)
- Maria Theresa Bland (c. 1769–1838)
- Kateřina Veronika Anna Dusíkova (1769–1833)
- Nannette Streicher (1769–1833)
- Vincenta Da Ponte (fl. second half 18th century)
- Marianne Sessi (177?–1847)
- Klementyna Grabowska (Countess Clementine) (1771–1831)
- Lucile Grétry (1772–1790)
- Maria Frances Parke (1772–1822)
- Sophie Bawr (1773–1860)
- Maria Brizzi Giorgi (1775–1822)
- Sophia Corri Dussek (1775–1847)
- Margaret Essex (1775–1807)
- Sophie Gail (1775–1819)
- Wilhelmine von Troschke und Rosenwehrt (1775–1830)
- Sophie Gay (1776–1852)
- Mme. Tarbé des Sablons (1777–1855)
- Pauline Duchambge (1778–1858)
- Louise Reichardt (1779–1826)
- Ekaterina Likoshin (fl. 1800–1810)
- Sophie Lebrun (1781–1863)
- Charlotta Seuerling (1782–1828)
- Hortense de Beauharnais (1783–1837)
- Henriette Löfman (1784–1836)
- Therese Emilie Henriette Winkel (1784–1867)
- Bettina von Arnim (Bettina Brentano) (1785–1859)
- Catherina Cibbini-Kozeluch (1785–1858)
- Isabella Colbran (1785–1845)
- Fanny Krumpholtz Pittar (1785–1815)
- Marie Bigot (1786–1820)
- Caroline Boissier-Butini (1786–1836)
- Le Sénéchal de Kerkado (c. 1786–after 1805)
- Marie Nicole Simonin Pollet (1787-1864)
- Wilhelmine Schwertzell (1787–1863)
- Elena Asachi (1789–1877)
- Augustine Renaud d`Allen (1798–after 1821)
- Maria Agata Szymanowska (1789–1831)
- Harriet Browne (1790–1858)
- Elise Schlick (1790–1855)
- Gertrude van den Bergh (1793–1840)
- Amalie, Princess of Saxony (1794–1870)
- Olivia Buckley (born mid-1790s–after 1845)
- Mme Delaval (fl. 1791–1802)
- Hedda Wrangel (1792–1833)
- Caroline Ridderstolpe (1793–1878)
- Helene Liebmann (1796–1835)
- Mathilda d'Orozco (1796–1863)
- Emilie Zumsteeg (1796–1857)
- Annette von Droste-Hülshoff (1797–1848)
- Virginie Morel-du Verger (1799–1869)
- Marie Schauff (fl. 1799–1844)
- Maria Fredrica von Stedingk (1799–1868)
- Filipina Brzezińska-Szymanowska (1800–1886)
- Susanna Nerantzi (fl. 1830–1840)

== 1801–1850 ==
- Onestina Ricotti (19th century)
- Caroline Sawath (19th century)
- Theresa Schaeffer (19th century)
- Marianna Bottini (1802–1858)
- Marion Dix Sullivan (1802–1860)
- Eliza Flower (1803–1846)
- Anna Sick (1803–1895)
- Isidora Zegers (1803–1869)
- Louise Farrenc (1804–1875)
- Friederike Proch Benesch (1805–1872)
- Louise Bertin (1805–1877)
- Fanny Hensel (1805–1847)
- Elizabeth Masson (1806–1865)
- Adelaide Orsola Appignani (1807–1884)
- Helen Blackwood (1807–1867)
- Emma Hartmann (1807–1851)
- H. Servier (1807–1858)
- Elise Rondonneau (fl. 1827–1860s)
- Princess Cecilia of Sweden (1807–1844)
- Caroline Wiseneder (1807–1868)
- Maria Malibran (1808–1836)
- Caroline Elizabeth Sarah Norton (1808–1877)
- Anna Caroline Oury (1808–1880)
- Leopoldine Blahetka (1809–1885)
- Hanna Brooman (1809–1887)
- Baronne Almaury de Maistre (1809–1875)
- Johanna Kinkel (1810–1858)
- Louise Geneviève de Le Hye (1810–1838)
- Loïsa Puget (1810–1889)
- Elise Schmezer (1810–1856)
- Alicia Ann Scott (1810–1900)
- Josefa Somellera (1810–1885)
- Carolina Uccelli (1810–1885)
- Ann Mounsey (1811–1891)
- Emilie Mayer (1812–1883)
- Amalia Redec (1812–1885)
- Sophie Seipt (1812–1889)
- Mathilde Ringelsberg (1813–1877)
- Julie von Webenau née Baroni-Cavalcabò (1813–1887)
- Delphine von Schauroth (1814–1887)
- Thérèse Wartel (1814–1865)
- Fredrikke Egeberg (1815–1861)
- Josephine Lang (1815–1880)
- Lucja Rucinska (1817, 1818 or 1820–1882)
- Mary Anne à Beckett (1817–1863)
- Harriet Anne Smart (1817–1883)
- Caroline Orger (1818–1892)
- Caroline Reinagle (1818–1892)
- Laura Wilson Barker (1819–1905)
- Ellen Dickson (1819–1878)
- Jacobine Gjertz (1819–1862)
- Clara Schumann (1819–1896)
- Elizabeth Stirling (1819–1895)
- Augusta Browne (1820–1882)
- Felicita Casella (c. 1820–after 1865)
- Emilie Hammarskjöld (1821–1854)
- Clara Angela Macirone (1821–1895)
- Charlotte Sainton-Dolby (1821–1885)
- Maria Anna Stubenberg (1821–1912)
- Pauline Viardot (1821–1910)
- Betty Boije (1822–1854)
- Faustina Hasse Hodges (1822–1895)
- Hermine Rudersdorff (1822–1882)
- Caroline Samuel (1822–1851)
- Amalie Scholl (1823–1879)
- Louise Strantz (1823–1909)
- Maria Vespermann (1823–1882)
- Emma Maria Macfarren (1824–1895)
- Marie Siegling (1824–1919)
- Jane Sloman (1824–after 1850)
- Virginia Gabriel (1825–1877)
- Kate Loder (1825–1904)
- Nina Stollewerk (1825–1914)
- Victorine Farrenc (1826–1859)
- Augustine Lorotte (1826–19??)
- Maria Lindsay (1827–1898)
- Teresa Milanollo (1827–1904)
- Julia Niewiarowska-Brzozowska (1827–1891)
- Elizabeth Philp (1827–1885)
- Eugenie Santa Coloma Sourget (1827–1895)
- Clémence de Grandval (1828–1907)
- Leonie Tonel (1828-1886)
- Anna Schuppe (1829–1903)
- Charlotte Alington Barnard (1830–1869)
- Charlotte Tardieu (1829–1890)
- Aurore von Haxthausen (1830–1888)
- Agathe Plitt (1831-1902)
- Fanny Arthur Robinson (1831–1879)
- Martha von Sabinin (1831–1892)
- Julia Woolf (1831–1893)
- Louise Béguin-Salomon (1831–1916)
- Caroline Richings (1832–1882)
- Emily Bruce Roelofson (1832–1921)
- Mathilde Hannah von Rothschild (1832–1924)
- Modesta Sanginés Uriarte (1832–1887)
- Sophia Dellaporta (fl. second half of the 19th century)
- Clotilde Kainerstorfer (1833–1897)
- Jane Roeckel (1833–1907)
- Kate Lucy Ward (1833–1915)
- Esmeralda Athanasiu-Gardeev (1834–1917)
- Tekla Bądarzewska-Baranowska (1834–1861)
- Teckla Juel (1834–1904)
- Anna Pessiak-Schmerling (1834–1896)
- Fanny Puzzi (1834-1913)
- Helen Tretbar (1835–1902)
- Johanne Amelie Fenger (1836–1913)
- Susan McFarland Parkhurst (1836–1918)
- Anaïs Perrière-Pilte (1836–1878)
- Constance Faunt Le Roy Runcie (1836–1911)
- Charlotte Sporleder (1836–1915)
- Pauline Thys (c.1836–1909)
- Caroline Wichern (1836–1906)
- Carlotta Ferrari (1837–1907)
- Bertha Tammelin (1836–1915)
- Georgina Weldon (1837–1914)
- Anna Ware Poole (1838-1929)
- Harriet Maitland Young (1838–1923)
- Liliʻuokalani (1838–1917)
- Louise Haenel de Cronenthall (1839–c. 1876)
- Lotten Edholm (1839–1930)
- Laura Constance Netzel (1839–1927)
- Alice Mary Smith (1839–1884)
- Ingeborg von Bronsart (1840–1913)
- Theodora Cormontan (1840–1922)
- Georgina Schubert (1840–1878)
- Mary Helena Synge (1840–1917)
- Elfrida Andrée (1841–1929)
- Clara H. Scott (1841–1897)
- Louise Héritte-Viardot (1841–1918)
- Julie Waldburg-Wurzach (1841–1914)
- Josefina Brdlíková (1843–1910)
- Célanie Carissan (1843–1927)
- Florence Ashton Marshall (1843–1922)
- Oliveria Louisa Prescott (1843–1919)
- Marguerite Olagnier (1844–1906)
- Marie de Pierpont (1844-1896)
- Clara Kathleen Rogers (1844–1931)
- Manuela Antonia Márquez García-Saavedra (1844–1890)
- Maria Broel-Plater (1845-1895)
- Ika Peyron (1845–1922)
- Pauline Rosenthal (1845–1912)
- Giuseppina Vitali (1845–1915)
- Regina Watson (1845–1913)
- Ella Adayevskaya (1846–1926)
- Marie Jaëll (1846–1925)
- Sophie Menter (1846–1918)
- Emma Pitt (1846-1919)
- Helen Radnor (1846-1929)
- Valentina Serova (1846–1924)
- Agnes Tyrrell (1846–1883)
- Antonietta Gambara Untersteiner (1846–1896)
- Eliza Mazzucato Young (1846–1937)
- Eloísa D'Herbil (1847–1943)
- Agathe Backer Grøndahl (1847–1907)
- Chiquinha Gonzaga (1847–1935)
- Augusta Holmès (1847–1903)
- Marguerite Samuel (1847–1912)
- Agnes Zimmermann (1847–1925)
- Josephine Amann-Weinlich (1848–1887)
- Louise Filliaux-Tiger (1848–1916)
- Nadezhda Rimskaya-Korsakova (1848–1919)
- Teresa Seneke (1848–1875)
- Frances Allitsen (1849–1912)
- Soledad Bengoecha de Cármena (1849–1893)
- Catalina Berroa (1849–1911)
- Roberta Geddes-Harvey (1849–1930)
- Ludmila Jeske-Choińska-Mikorska (1849–1898)
- Nanna Magdalene Liebmann (1849–1935)
- Kate Ralph (1849-1937)
- Felicia Tuczek (1849–1905)
- Pauline Volkstein (1849–1925)
- Stephanie Wurmbrand-Stuppach (1849–1919)
- Luise Adolpha Le Beau (1850–1927)
- Jeanne Rivet (1850–1913)
- Carrie Burpee Shaw (1850–1946)
- Kate Simmons (1850–1926)
- Emma Roberto Steiner (1850–1928)

== 1851–1875 ==
- Maria Wilhelmj (185?–1930)
- Eva Best (1851–1925)
- Mary Grant Carmichael (1851–1935)
- Gabrielle Ferrari (1851–1921)
- Annie Fortescue Harrison (1851–1944)
- Kate Vanderpoel (born 1851)
- Helena Munktell (1852–1919)
- Marie Townsend (1851–1912)
- Antha Minerva Virgil (c. 1852–1939)
- Amanda Röntgen-Maier (1853–1894)
- Teresa Carreño (1853–1917)
- Susan Trew (born 1853)
- Josephine Troup (1853–1912)
- Mary Augusta Wakefield (1853–1910)
- Julie Rivé-King (1854–1937)
- Manuela Cornejo Sanchez (1854–1902)
- Hendrika van Tussenbroek (1854–1935)
- Nellie Bangs Skelton (1855–1911)
- Maude Valérie White (1855–1937)
- Cecilia Arizti (1856–1930)
- Eva Dell'Acqua (1856–1930)
- Kateřina Emingerová (1856–1934)
- Helen Hopekirk (1856–1945)
- Natalia Janotha (1856–1932)
- Gilda Ruta (1856–1932)
- Mary Elizabeth Turner Salter (1856–1938)
- Fannie Lovering Skinner (1856–1938)
- Berta Bock (1857–1945)
- Cécile Chaminade (1857–1944)
- Rosalind Frances Ellicott (1857–1924)
- Ethel R. Harraden (1857–1917)
- Cécile Hartog (1857–1940)
- Mathilde Kralik von Mayerswalden (1857–1944)
- Mary Knight Wood (1857–1944)
- Emma Wooge (1857–1935)
- Carrie B. Wilson Adams (1858–1940)
- Mélanie Bonis (1858–1937)
- Emma Mundella (1858–1896)
- Olga Radecki (1858-1933)
- Catharina van Rennes (1858–1940)
- Helen Rhodes (Guy d’Hardelot) (1858–1936)
- Frances C. Robinson (1858-1905)
- Clara Ross (1858-1954)
- Hilda Sehested (1858–1936)
- Ethel Smyth (1858–1944)
- Stella Stocker (1858–1925)
- Lydia Kunz Venth (1858–1931)
- Adelheid Wette (1858–1916)
- Sophie Wolff-Fritz (1858–1938)
- Hedwige Chrétien (1859–1944)
- Laura Sedgwick Collins (1859–1927)
- Narcisa Freixas (1859–1926)
- Vincenza Garelli della Morea (1859–after 1924)
- Susie Frances Harrison (1859–1935)
- Elisabeth Meyer (1859–1927)
- Ida Georgina Moberg (1859–1947)
- Clara Rees (1859-?)
- Margit Sztaray (1859–?)
- Teresa Tanco Cordovez de Herrera (1859–1946)
- Bertha Tapper (1859–1915)
- Hope Temple (1859–1938)
- Agnes Tschetschulin (1859–1942)
- Ellen Wright (1859–1904)
- Laura Valborg Aulin (1860–1928)
- Alicia Van Buren (1860–1922)
- Gisela Frankl (1860–1935)
- Celeste de Longpré Heckscher (1860–1928)
- Halina Krzyżanowska (1860–1937)
- Ella May Dunning Smith (1860–1934)
- Isabel Stewart North (1860–1929)
- Hilda Wilson (1860–1918)
- Amy Woodforde-Finden (1860–1919)
- Mary J. A. Wurm (1860–1938)
- Florence Everilda Goodeve (1861–1915)
- Georgie Boyden St. John (1861–1899)
- Erika Stang (1861–1898)
- Anna Teichmüller (1861–1940)
- Florence Aylward (1862–1950)
- Carrie Bond (1862–1946)
- Dora Bright (1862–1951)
- Liza Lehmann (1862–1918)
- Adela Maddison (1862–1929)
- Mona McBurney (1862–1932)
- Harriet P. Sawyer (1862–1934)
- Edith Swepstone (1862–1930)
- Marian Arkwright (1863–1922)
- Maria Chefaliady-Taban (1863–1932)
- Abbie Gerrish-Jones (1863–1929)
- Helen Francis Hood (1863–1949)
- Izabella Kuliffay (1863–1945)
- Alicia Adélaide Needham (1863–1945)
- Cornélie van Oosterzee (1863–1943)
- Ada Weigel Powers (1863-1947)
- Caroline Holme Walker (1863–1955)
- Elisabeth Wintzer (1863–1933)
- Florence Maude Ewart (1864–1949)
- Eleanor Everest Freer (1864–1942)
- Mary Rosselli Nissim (1864-1937)
- Alice Tegnér (1864–1943)
- Borghild Holmsen (1865–1938)
- Lillian Tait Sheldon (1865–1925)
- Fannie Morris Spencer (1865–1943)
- Amanda Ira Aldridge (1866–1956)
- Henriette van den Boorn-Coclet (1866–1945)
- Clara Anna Korn (1866–1941)
- Laura Lemon (1866–1924)
- Lily Reiff (1866-1958)
- Alice Sauvrezis (1866–1946)
- Tekla Griebel Wandall (1866–1940)
- Mary Louisa White (1866–1935)
- Amy Beach (1867–1944)
- Margherita Galeotti (1867–after 1912)
- Amy Elsie Horrocks (1867–after 1915)
- Margaret Ruthven Lang (1867–1972)
- Alexandra Thomson (1867–1907)
- Gisella Delle Grazie (born 1868, fl. 1894–95)
- Signe Lund (1868–1950)
- Annie Patterson (1868–1934)
- Alice Locke Pittman (1868-1936)
- Gertrude Ina Robinson (1868-1950)
- Cora Decker Sargent (1868–1944)
- Anna Diller Starbuck (1868–1929)
- Joséphine Boulay (1869–1925)
- Virginia Mariani Campolieti (1869–1941)
- Edith Chamberlayne (1869-1918)
- Maria Antonietta Picconi (1869–1926)
- Caro Roma (1869–1937)
- Grace W. Root (1869-1898)
- Patty Stair (1869–1926)
- Else Streit (1869–?)
- Therese Wittman (1869–1942)
- Grace Chadbourne (1870–1919)
- Eugénie-Emilie Juliette Folville (1870–1946)
- Annie Maria Grimson (1870–1949)
- Nobu Kōda (1870–1946)
- Mon Schjelderup (1870–1934)
- Pauline B. Story (1870–1952)
- Pamela Motley Verrall (1870–1948)
- Lola Carrier Worrell (1870–1929)
- Hélène-Frédérique de Faye-Jozin (1871–1942) (name often abbreviated as Fréd. de Faye-Jozin)
- Nellie von Gerichten Smith (1871–1952)
- Anita Socola Specht (1871–1958)
- Florence Turner-Maley (1871–1962)
- Jane Vieu (1871–1955)
- Bessie Marshall Whitely (1871–1944)
- Elza Löthner-Rahmn (1872-1933)
- Bertha Remick (1872-1965)
- Louise Tunison (1872–1899)
- Leokadiya Kashperova (1872–1940)
- Clara Mathilda Faisst (1872–1948)
- Mabel Madison Watson (1872–1952)
- Isabel Güell i López (1872-1956)
- Eliza Woods (1872–1961)
- María de las Mercedes Adam de Aróstegui (1873–1957)
- Lluïsa Casagemas (1873–after 1930)
- Anna Cramer (1873–1968)
- Celeste Jaguaribe de Matos Celeste (1873–1938)
- Emma Lomax (1873–1963)
- Mary Carr Moore (1873–1957)
- Agnes Clune Quinlan (1873-1949)
- Anice Terhune (1873–1964)
- Elise Fellows White (1873–1953)
- Maude Nugent (1873/4–1958)
- Eugénie-Victorine-Jeanne Alombert (1874–1964)
- Ethel Barns (1874–1948)
- Katharine Emily Eggar (1874–1961)
- Lena Stein-Schneider (1874–1958)
- Elsa Swartz (1874–1948)
- Frances Tarbox (1874–1959)
- Josephine Trott (1874–1950)
- Bertha Frensel Wegener (1874–1953)
- Rosalie Balmer Smith Cale (1875–1958)
- Adele Bloesch-Stöcker (1875–1978)
- Irène Fuerison (1875–1931)
- Grace Walls Linn (1874–1940)
- Katharine Lucke (1875–1962)
- Maria Luisa Ponsa (1875-1919)
- Frances Marion Ralston (1875-1952)
- Henriette Renié (1875–1956)
- Sofie Rohnstock (1875-1964)
- Gertrude Martin Rohrer (1875-1968)
- Erna Schorlemmer (1875–1945)
- Satella Waterstone (1875–1938)
- Vilma von Webenau (1875–1953)
- Sara Wennerberg-Reuter (1875–1959)

== 1876–1900 ==
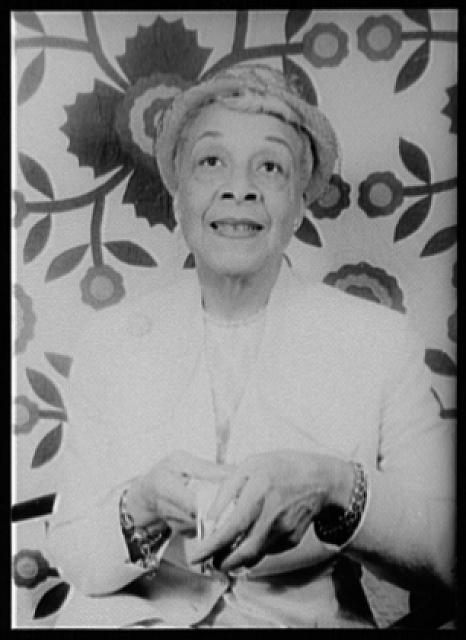
Portrait of Nora Holt by Carl Van Vechten

- Lucia Contini Anselmi (1876–after 1913)
- Hélène Fleury-Roy (1876–1957)
- Armande de Polignac (1876–1962)
- Teresa Clotilde del Riego (1876–1968)
- Charlotte Ruegger (1876-1959)
- Jean E. Williams (1876–1965)
- Addie Anderson Wilson (1876–1966)
- Elsa Laura Wolzogen (1876–1945)
- Mabel Wheeler Daniels (1877–1971)
- Elisabeth Kuyper (1877–1953)
- Jadwiga Sarnecka (1877 or 1883–1913)
- Anna Schytte (1877–1953)
- Anna Suszczynska (1877–1931)
- Josephine Crew Aylwin (1878-after 1919)
- Jeanne Beijerman-Walraven (1878–1969)
- Eugenia Calosso (1878–1914)
- Johanna Müller-Hermann (1878–1941)
- Florence P. Rea (1878-1924)
- Louise Robyn (1878-1949)
- Lalla Ryckoff (1878–1977)
- Hope Squire (1878–1936)
- Yuliya Veysberg (1878/1880–1942)
- Wanda Landowska (1879–1959)
- Magdeleine Boucherit Le Faure (1879–1960)
- Matilee Loeb Evans (1879-1963)
- Carmela Mackenna (1879–1962)
- Alma Mahler (1879–1964)
- Poldowski (1879–1932)
- Johanna Senfter (1879–1961)
- Louise Siddall (1879–1935)
- Nannie Louise Wright (1879–1958)
- Clara Edwards (1880–1974)
- Ethel Scarborough (1880–1956)
- Elena Stanekaite-Laumyanskene (1880–1960)
- Geertruida van Vladeracken (1880–1947)
- Florence Wickham (1880–1962)
- Gena Branscombe (1881–1977)
- Reine Colaço Osorio-Swaab (1881–1971)
- Nancy Dalberg (1881–1949)
- Fannie Charles Dillon (1881–1974)
- Eleanor Rudall (1881–1960)
- Janet Mary Salsbury (1881–1951)
- Cecile Paul Simon (1881–1970)
- Marion Bauer (1882–1955)
- Mary Howe (1882–1964)
- Verdi Karns (1882–1925)
- Ernestina Lecuona y Casado (1882–1951)
- Mary Lucas (1882–1952)
- Adaline Shepherd (1883–1950)
- Dragica Legat Košmerl
- Eva Ruth Spalding (1883–1969)
- Dina Appeldoorn (1884–1938)
- Marguerite Béclard d'Harcourt (1884–1964)
- May Brahe (1884–1956)
- Nora Holt (1884–1974)
- Giulia Recli (1884–1970)
- Gisela Selden-Goth (1884–1975)
- Blanche Selva (1884–1942)
- Maria Elizabeth van Ebbenhorst Tengbergen (1885–1980)
- María Grever (1885–1951)
- Eva Jessye (1885–1992)
- Mana Zucca (1885–1981)
- Dora Pejačević (1885–1923)
- Frieda Schmitt-Lermann (born 1885)
- Louise Cooper Spindle (1885–1968)
- J. Lilian Vandevere (1885–1957)
- Edith Weiss-Mann (1885–1851)
- Giovanna Bruna Baldacci (1886–after 1910)
- Christabel Baxendale (1886–after 1951)
- Rebecca Helferich Clarke (1886–1979)
- Ellen Coleman (1886–1973)
- Elizabeth Gyring (1886–1970)
- Ethel Leginska (1886–1970)
- Geni Sadero (1886–1961)
- Margaret McClure Stitt (1886–1979)
- Herma Studeny (1886–1973)
- Annette Thoma (1886–1974)
- Nadia Boulanger (1887–1979)
- Mildred Couper (1887–1974)
- Emilia Gubitosi (1887–1972)
- Florence Beatrice Price (1887–1953)
- Angèle Ravizé (1887-1980)
- Meta Schumann (1887–1937)
- Margarete Schweikert (1887–1957)
- Anne Stratton (1887–1977)
- Lily Strickland (1887–1958)
- Bertha Tideman-Wijers (1887–1976)
- Bertha Weber (1887–1961)
- May Aufderheide (1888–1972)
- Carmen Barradas (1888–1963)
- Johanna Beyer (1888–1944)
- Ilse Fromm-Michaels (1888–1986)
- Anna Maria Klechniowska (1888–1973)
- Hildegard Quiel (1888-1971)
- Valentina Ramm (1888-1968)
- Julie Reisserová (1888–1938)
- Maria Rodrigo (1888–1967)
- Didia Saint Georges (1888–1979)
- Elna Sherman (1888–1964)
- Lyubov Streicher (1888–1958)
- Jeanette Tillett (1888–1965)
- Rosy Wertheim (1888–1949)
- Gertrude Hoag Wilson (1888–1968)
- Amy Aldrich Worth (1888–1967)
- Emiliana de Zubeldia (1888–1987)
- Ina Boyle (1889–1967)
- Ethel Glenn Hier (1889–1971)
- Eleni Lambiri (1889–1960)
- Gertrude Ross (1889-1957)
- Luise Schulze-Berghof (1889–1970)
- Elsa Stuart-Bergstrom (1889–1970)
- Celia Torrá (1889–1962)
- Hanna Vollenhoven (1889–1972)
- Vally Weigl (1889–1982)
- Helen Searles Westbrook (1889–1967)
- E. Florence Whitlock (1889–1978)
- Lydia Boucher (1890–1971)
- Marguerite Canal (1890–1978)
- Evelyn Faltis (1890–1937)
- Pauline Hall (1890–1969)
- Grace LeBoy (1890–1983)
- Kathleen Lockhart Manning (1890–1951)
- Eleanor Franklin Pike (1890-c. 1973)
- Eda Rapoport (1890–1968)
- Yvonne Rokseth (1890–1948)
- Dagmar de Corval Rybner (1890–1965)
- Sara Opal Search (1890–1961)
- Alice Marion Shaw (born 1890)
- Susan Spain-Dunk (1890–1962)
- Margaret Hoberg Turrell (1890–1948)
- Frida Kern (1891–1988)
- Florentina Mallá (1891–1973)
- Morfydd Llwyn Owen (1891–1918)
- Helen Roessing (1891-1957)
- Tamara Antonovna Shaverzashvili (1891–1955)
- Catherine Murphy Urner (1891–1942)
- Frances Turgeon Wiggin (1891–1985)
- Ethel Edith Bilsland (1892–1982)
- Johanna Bordewijk-Roepman (1892–1971)
- Katherine K. Davis (1892–1980)
- Mirrie Hill (1892–1986)
- Marija Hladnik Berden (1892–1924)
- Gladys Rich (1892-1972)
- Maria Scheepers (1892–1989)
- Louise E. Stairs (1892–1975)
- Germaine Tailleferre (1892–1983)
- Anne Upton (1892–1970)
- Ella May Walker (1892–1960)
- Mildred Weston (1892–1975)
- Helen Wing (1892–1981)
- Margareta Xenopol (1892–1979)
- Lili Boulanger (1893–1918)
- Marta Canales (1893–1986)
- Dorothy Gow (1893–1982)
- Helen Eugenia Hagan (1893–1964)
- Amy Upham Thomson McKean (1893–1972)
- Breda Scek (1893–1968)
- Philippine Schick (1893–1970)
- Theodora Troendle (1893–1972)
- Tamara Vakhvakhishvili (1893–1976)
- Kalitha Dorothy Fox (1894–1934)
- Jane M. Joseph (1894–1929)
- Edna Frida Pietsch (1894-1982)
- Elsa Respighi (1894–1996)
- Mildred Souers (1894–1977)
- Helen Steele (born 1894)
- Viola Van Katwijk (1894–1980)
- Awilda Villarini (1894–1989)
- Sláva Vorlová (1894–1973)
- Mildred Adair (1895-1943)
- Henriëtte Bosmans (1895–1952)
- Kathleen Dale (1895–1984)
- Hilda Emery Davis (1895-1995)
- Kathleen Richards (1895–1984)
- Esther Cox Todd (1895–1971)
- Mildred Lund Tyson (1895–1989)
- Vera Vinogradova (1895–1982)
- Maria Bach (1896–1978)
- Amice Calverley (1896–1959)
- Shirley Graham Du Bois (1896–1977)
- María Teresa Prieto (1896–1982)
- Anna Renfer (1896–1984)
- Mildred Barnes Royse (1896–1986)
- María Luisa Sepúlveda (1896–1958)
- Madelene Van Aardt (1896-19982)
- Lucie Vellère (1896–1966)
- Rossini Vrionides (1896–1943)
- Benna Moe (1897–1983)
- Florica Racovitză-Flondor (1897-1983)
- Margaret Sutherland (1897–1984)
- Muriel Emily Herbert (1897–1984)
- Kay Swift (1897–1993)
- Ruth Tripp (1897–1971)
- Mildred Cozzens Turner (1897–1992)
- Kathe Volkart-Schlager (1897–1976)
- Dorothy Wanderman (1897–1988)
- Mimi Wagensonner (1897–1970)
- Barbara Giuranna (1898–1998)
- Dorothy Howell (1898–1982)
- Grace Vamos (1898–1992)
- Stefania Turkewich (1998–1977)
- Jeanne Leleu (1898–1979)
- Svea Nordblad Welander (1898–1985)
- Glad Robinson Youse (1898–1985)
- Mansi Barberis (1899–1986)
- Radie Britain (1899–1994)
- Marcelle de Manziarly (1899–1989)
- Natalia Pravosudovich (1899-1988)
- Lili Wieruszowski (1899–1971)
- Edith Wire (1899–1973)
- Grete von Zieritz (1899–2001)
- Carmelina Delfin (c. 1900–after 1948)

== 1900s ==
- Lola Castegnaro (1900–1979)
- Lilian Elkington (1900–1969)
- Florence Margaret Spencer Palmer (1900–1987)
- Louise Christine Rebe (1900-1978)
- Winifred Emily Rees (1900-1976)
- Marion Morrey Richter (1900-1996)
- Andree Aeschlimann Rochat (1900-1990)
- Gladys Marie Stein (1900–1989)
- Zdenka Ticharich (1900–1979)
- Elinor Remick Warren (1900–1991)
- Gertrude Price Wollner (1900–1985)
- Lotte Backes (1901–1990)
- Miriam Rakhmankulova (1901-1990)
- Mirca Župnek Sancin (1901–1970)
- Ruth Crawford Seeger (1901–1953)
- Sophie Carmen Eckhardt-Gramatté (1901–1974)
- Dorothy James (1901–1982)
- Else Schmitz-Gohr (1901–1987)
- Emmy Wegener (1901–1973)
- Hedy Frank-Autheried (1902–1979)
- Marie Dare (1902–1976)
- Lūcija Garūta (1902–1977)
- Helvi Leiviskä (1902–1982)
- Doris Gertrude Sheppard (1902–1982)
- Irene Skovgaard (1902–1982)
- Freda Swain (1902–1985)
- Rose Thisse-Derouette (1902–1989)
- Pava Turtygina (1902–1985)
- Claude Arrieu (1903–1990)
- Helza Cameu (1903–1995)
- María Enma Botet Dubois (1903–?)
- Rhoda Coghill (1903–2000)
- Avril Coleridge-Taylor (1903–1998)
- Lillian Fuchs (1901–1995)
- Jessie Furze (1903–1984)
- Marianne Gary-Schaffhauser (1903–1992)
- Ivy Priaulx Rainier (1903–1986)
- Miriam Shatal (1903–2006)
- Joanídia Sodré (1903–1975)
- Iet Stants (1903–1968)
- Heidi Sundblad-Halme (1903–1973)
- June Weybright (1903–1996)
- Maria Semyonovna Zavalishina (born 1903)
- Martha Alter (1904–1976)
- Dinorá de Carvalho (1904–1980)
- Undine Smith Moore (1904–1989)
- Lita Spena (1904–1989)
- Dorothy Parke (1904–1990)
- Esther Rofe (1904–2000)
- Anne Terrier Laffaille (1904–1971)
- Mary Wiggins (1904–1974)
- Margaret Wigham (1904–1972)
- Stefania Anatolyevna Zaranek (1904–1972)
- Toni Beaulieu (1905–1994)
- Andrée Bonhomme (1905–1982)
- Ulric Cole (1905–1992)
- Mary Plumstead (1905-1980)
- Elizabeth Poston (1905–1987)
- Helen Pyke (1905–1954)
- Violet Reiser (1905-1981)
- Olive Nelson Russell (1905–1989)
- Verdina Shlonsky (1905–1990)
- Constance Cochnower Virtue (1905–1992)
- Shuxian Xiao (1905–1991)
- Claire Delbos (1906–1959)
- Miriam Gideon (1906–1996)
- Zara Levina (1906–1976)
- Elisabeth Lutyens (1906–1983)
- Audrey Piggott (1906-2001)
- Lauma Reinholde (1906-1986)
- Gertrud Hermine Kuenzel Roberts (1906-1995)
- Berta Alves de Sousa (1906–1997)
- Louise Talma (1906–1996)
- Elinor Meissner Traeger (1906–1983)
- Clara Wildschut (1906–1950)
- Grace Williams (1906–1977)
- Ludmila Anatolievna Yaroshevskaya (1906–1975)
- Esther Zweig (1906–1981)
- Ann Ronell (1906/1908–1993)
- Lora Aborn (1907–2005)
- Guirne Creith (1907–1996)
- Yvonne Desportes (1907–1993)
- Koharik Gazarossian (1907–1967)
- Imogen Holst (1907–1984)
- Elizabeth Maconchy (1907–1994)
- Maria Teresa Pelegrí i Marimón (1907–1995)
- Roberta Martin (1907–1969)
- Helen C. Rockefeller (1907-1957)
- Hazel Volkart (1907–1985)
- Claude Porter White (1907–1975)
- Aimée Van de Wiele (1907–1981)
- Roberta Bitgood (1908–2007)
- Jean Coulthard (1908–2000)
- Helen Glatz (1908–1996)
- Joan Mary Last (1908–2002)
- Zenobia Powell Perry (1908–2004)
- Trude Rittmann (1908–2005)
- Alice Samter (1908–2004)
- Ida Vivado (1908–1989)
- Grażyna Bacewicz (1909–1969)
- Maria Dziewulska (1909–2006)
- Minna Keal (1909–1999)
- Ljubica Marić (1909–2003)
- Helen Perkin (1909–1996)
- Berenice Robinson (1909-1990)
- Alice Streatch (1909–1999)
- Dana Suesse (1909–1987)
- Cecile Vashaw (1909–1985)
- Zinaida Petrovna Ziberova (born 1909)

== 1910s ==
- Ana Serrano Redonnet (191?–1993)
- Elsa Barraine (1910–1999)
- Lycia de Biase Bidart (1910–1990)
- Henriette Puig-Roget (1910-1992)
- Patricia Blomfield Holt (1910–2003)
- Shena Fraser (1910–1993)
- Lila Lalauni (1910–1996)
- Paule Maurice (1910–1967)
- Evelyn La Rue Pittman (1910–1992)
- Dorothy Priesing (1910-1999)
- Mercedes Roldós Freixes (1910–1980)
- Friederike Schwarz (1910–1945)
- Dagmara Slianova-Mizandari (1910–1983)
- Galina Konstantinovna Smirnova (1910–1980)
- Alliene Brandon Webb (1910–1965)
- Mary Lou Williams (1910–1981)
- Louise Yazbeck (1910–1995)
- Kikuko Kanai (1911–1986)
- Anne-Marie Ørbeck (1911–1996)
- Marina Scriabina (1911–1998)
- Julia Smith (1911–1989)
- Phyllis Tate (1911–1987)
- Margaret Jones Wiles (1911–2000)
- Ilse Gerda Wunsch (1911–2003)
- Lydia Auster (1911–1989)
- Jeanne Behrend (1911–1988)
- Peggy Glanville-Hicks (1912–1990)
- Gisela Hernández (1912–1971)
- Sirvart Karamanuk (1912–2008)
- Barbara Pentland (1912–2000)
- Irena Pfeiffer (1912–1996)
- Tamara Popatenko (1912-1991)
- Beryl Price (born 1912)
- Jadwiga Szajna-Lewandowska (1912–1994)
- Violet Archer (1913–2000)
- Isabel Aretz (1913–2005)
- Margaret Allison Bonds (1913–1972)
- Matilde Capuis (1913–2017)
- Peggy Stuart Coolidge (1913–1981)
- Eiluned Davies (1913–1999)
- Sylvia Fine (1913–1991)
- Vivian Fine (1913–2000)
- Dulcie Holland (1913–2000)
- Miriam Hyde (1913–2005)
- Irene Marschand Ritter (active 1913-1960)
- Clorinda Rosato (1913–1985)
- Netty Simons (1913–1994)
- Rodica Sutzu (1913–1979)
- Michiko Toyama (1913–2006)
- Jane Vignery (1913–1974)
- Esther Allan (1914–1985)
- Cacilda Borges Barbosa (1914–2010)
- Suzanne Joly (1914–2012)
- Minuetta Kessler (1914–2002)
- Teresa Rampazzi (1914–2001)
- Josée Vigneron-Ramackers (1914–2002)
- Ethel Tench Rogers (1914-2008)
- Ana Rugeles (1914–2012)
- Regina Hansen Willman (1914–1965)
- Esther Ballou (1915–1973)
- Júlia Hajdú (1915–1987)
- Pamela Harrison (1915–1990)
- Najla Jabor (1915–2001)
- Vítězslava Kaprálová (1915–1940)
- Eunice Katunda (1915–1991)
- Maria Matos Priolli (1915-2000)
- Alice McElroy Procter (1915-1987)
- Marjo Tal (1915–2006)
- Joan Trimble (1915–2000)
- Pamela Motley Verrall (1915–1996)
- Berthe di Vito-Delvaux (1915–2005)
- Edwina Florence Wills (1915–2002)
- Ann Wyeth McCoy (1915–2005)
- Jane Corner Young (1915–2001)
- Olga De Blanck Martín (1916–1998)
- Carin Malmlöf-Forssling (1916–2005)
- Lois Rhea (1916-2004)
- Ruth Shaw Wylie (1916–1989)
- Erna Tauro (1916–1993)
- Beatrice Witkin (1916–1990)
- Els Aarne (1917–1995)
- Joyce Howard Barrell (1917–1989)
- Clarisse Leite (1917–2003)
- Geraldine Mucha (1917–2012)
- Maj Sønstevold (1917–1996)
- Ėta Mayseyewna Tïrmand (1917–2008)
- Erna Woll (1917–2005)
- Frances Ziffer (1917–1996)
- María Matilde Alea Fernández (1918–2006)
- Lila-Gene George (1918–2017)
- Lina Pires de Campos (1918–2003)
- Gayane Č'ebotaryan (1918–1998)
- Dilys Elwyn-Edwards (1918–2012)
- Lucrecia Roces Kasilag (1918–2008)
- Matilde Salvador (1918–2007)
- Denise Tolkowsky (1918–1991)
- Jórunn Viðar (1918–2017)
- Norma Wendelburg (1918–2016)
- Yevgania Yosifovna Yakhina (1918–1983)
- Roslyn Brogue (1919–1981)
- Eleonora Eksanishvili (1919–2003)
- Ludmila Frajt (1919–1999)
- Hilda Pires dos Reis (1919-2001)
- Dorothy Whitson Freed (1919–2000)
- Hilda Jerea (1919–1980)
- Dee Libbey (1919–-1988)
- Tamara Maliukova Sidorenko (1919–2005)
- Qu Xixian (1919–2008)
- Galina Ustvolskaya (1919–2006)
- Constance Walton (1919–2017)

== 1920s ==
- Rolande Falcinelli (1920–2006)
- Dorothea Anne Franchi (1920–2003)
- María Teresa Oller (1920–2018)
- Nydia Pereyra-Lizaso (1920–1998)
- Rosette Renshaw (1920–1997)
- Hazel Ghazarian Skaggs (1920–2005)
- Janina Skowronska (1920–1992)
- Marion Vree (1920–2012)
- Helen L. Weiss (1920–1948)
- Chaya Arbel (1921–2007)
- Dorothea Austin (1921–2011)
- Adrienne Clostre (1921–2006)
- Jeanne Demessieux (1921–1968)
- Ruth Gipps (1921–1999)
- Nazife Güran (1921–1993)
- Mara Petrova (1921–1997)
- Elise Popovici (1921-2011)
- Eva Saito-Noda (1921–2004)
- Margaret Vardell Sandresky (born 1921)
- Magdalene Schauss-Flake (1921–2008)
- Alice Sirooni (1921–2011)
- Hanna Skalska-Szemioth (1921–1964)
- Rosalina Abejo (1922–1991)
- Margaret Buechner (1922–1998)
- Doreen Carwithen (1922–2003)
- Odette Gartenlaub (1922–2014)
- Kyla Greenbaum (1922–2017)
- Ester Mägi (1922–2021)
- Sylvia Rexach (1922–1961)
- Beatrice Schroeder Rose (1922–2014)
- Jeanine Rueff (1922–1999)
- Virginia Seay (1922–2015)
- Nadezhda Simonyan (1922–1997)
- Dorothy Geneva Styles (1922–1984)
- Doris Akers (1923–1995)
- Teresa Borràs i Fornell (1923–2010)
- Madeleine Dring (1923–1977)
- Jean Eichelberger Ivey (1923–2010)
- Gregoria Karides Suchy (1923-2018)
- Ursula Mamlok (1923–2016)
- Dika Newlin (1923–2006)
- Elena Romero (1923–1996)
- Yudif Grigorevna Rozhavskaya (1923–1982)
- Maria Schüppel (1923–2011)
- Mira Sulpizi (born 1923)
- Asya Sultanova (1923–2021)
- Ludmila Ulehla (1923–2009)
- Katharine Mulky Warne (1923–2015)
- Elisabet Wentz-Janacek (1923–2014)
- Shafiga Akhundova (1924–2013)
- Leni Alexander (1924–2005)
- Jeanne Colin-De Clerck (born 1924)
- Zhivka Klinkova (1924–2002)
- Angela Morley (1924–2009)
- Krystyna Moszumańska-Nazar (1924–2009)
- Tatyana Nikolayeva (1924–1993)
- Gladys Nordenstrom (1924–2016)
- Else Marie Pade (1924–2016)
- Julia Perry (1924–1979)
- Jeannine Richer (1924–2022)
- Denise Roger (1924–2005)
- Anna Lemmer Badenhorst Rudolph (1924–1995)
- Ruth Schonthal (1924–2006)
- Jitka Snížková (1924–1989)
- Sylvia Soublette (1924–2020)
- Erzsébet Szőnyi (1924–2019)
- Tui St. George Tucker (1924–2004)
- Consuelo Velázquez (1924–2005)
- Bebe Barron (1925–2008)
- Cathy Berberian (1925–1983)
- P. Bhanumathi (1925–2005)
- Edith Borroff (1925–2019)
- Hilda Dianda (1925–2014)
- Ginette Keller (1925–2010)
- Lyudmila Lyadova (1925–2021)
- Nelly Moretto (1925–1978)
- Amado Santos Ocampo (1925–2009)
- Daphne Oram (1925–2003)
- Alice Parker (1925–2023)
- Heda Piliš (1925-2015)
- Jeanne Ellison Shaffer (1925–2009)
- Yolande Uyttenhove (1925–2000)
- Margaret Shelley Vance (1925–2008)
- Estelle White (1925–2011)
- Ruth White (1925–2013)
- Puchi Balseiro (1926–2007)
- Modesta Bor (1926–1998)
- Janine Charbonnier (1926–2022)
- Irina Elcheva (1926–2013)
- Zhun Huang (1926–2024)
- Betsy Jolas (born 1926)
- Melinda Kistétényi (1926–1999)
- Maria de Lourdes Martins (1926–2009)
- Carmen Petra Basacopol (1926–2023)
- Claire Polin (1926–1995)
- Vera Nicolaevna Preobrajenska (1926-2011)
- Marga Richter (1926–2020)
- Marilyn Rinehart (1926–2012)
- Esther Scliar (1926–1978)
- Natela Svanidze (1926–2017)
- An-Ming Wang (born 1926)
- Irina Yel'cheva (1926–2013)
- Ruth Zechlin (1926–2007)
- Valentine Yanovna Zhubinskaya (1926–2013)
- Marilyn J Ziffrin (1926–2018)
- Dolores Claman (1927–2021)
- Emma Lou Diemer (1927–2024)
- Elaine Hugh-Jones (1927–2021)
- Eva Schorr (1927–2016)
- Williametta Spencer (born 1927)
- Mary Jeanne Van Appledorn (1927–2014)
- Marcelle Villin (1927–2022)
- Chris Mary Francine Whittle (born 1927)
- Rolande Maxwell Young (1927–2015)
- Gaziza Zhubanova (1927–1993)
- Margrit Zimmermann (1927–2020)
- Luna Alcalay (1928–2012)
- Ruth Anderson (1928–2019)
- Betty Jackson King (1928–1994)
- Judith Dvorkin (1928–1995)
- Sarah Feigin (1928–2011)
- Beverly Grigsby (1928–2022)
- Lena McLin (1928–2023)
- Gladys Smuckler Moskowitz (1928–2024)
- Nadežka Mosusova (born 1928)
- Thea Musgrave (born 1928)
- Adelaide Pereira da Silva (1928–2021)
- Marie Pooler (1928-2013)
- Mary McCarty Snow (1928–2012)
- Mira J. Spektor (1928–2021)
- Louise Spizizen (1928–2010)
- Ellen R. Thompson (1928–2014)
- Arlene Buckneberg Ydstie (1928-2025)
- Zlata Tkach (1928–2006)
- Toshiko Akiyoshi (born 1929)
- Nini Bulterijs (1929–1989)
- Geghuni Hovannesi Chitchian (born 1929)
- Siegrid Ernst (1929–2022)
- Josima Feldschuh (1929–1943)
- Micki Grant (1929–2021)
- Dina Koston (1929–2009)
- Nada Ludvig-Pečar (1929–2008)
- Lata Mangeshkar (1929–2022)
- Meena Mangeshkar (born 1931)
- Pierrette Mari (born 1929)
- Aleksandra Pakhmutova (born 1929)
- Elena Petrová (1929–2002)
- Natalia Raigorodsky (1929-2018)
- Sharon Elery Rogers (1929–2022)
- Irma Urteaga (1929–2022)
- Jeannine Vanier (1929–2023)

== 1930s ==
- Yardena Alotin (1930–1994)
- Vera Baeva (1930–2017)
- Jacqueline Fontyn (born 1930)
- Joan Franks Williams (1930–2003)
- Antoinette Kirkwood (1930–2014)
- Zhanna Kolodub (1930–2025)
- Kay Lande (1930–2022)
- Ruth Lomon (1930–2017)
- Gudrun Lund (1930–2020)
- Jana Obrovská (1930–1987)
- Betty Roe (born 1930)
- Clotilde Rosa (1930–2017)
- Marina Saiz-Salazar (1930–1990)
- E. Anne Schwerdtfeger (1930–2008)
- Naomi Shemer (1930–2004)
- Ann Loomis Silsbee (1930–2003)
- Helen Camille Stanley (1930–2021)
- Nancy Van de Vate (1930–2023)
- Marion Verhaalen (1930–2020)
- Monica Witni (1930–1982)
- Nancy Laird Chance (born 1931)
- Lucia Dlugoszewski (1931–2000)
- Felicia Donceanu (1931–2022)
- Sofia Gubaidulina (1931–2025)
- Rosa Guraieb (1931–2014)
- Yüksel Koptagel (born 1931)
- Young-ja Lee (born 1931)
- Maria Dolores Malumbres (1931–2019)
- Myriam Marbe (1931–1997)
- Joyce Mekeel (1931–1997)
- Phillipa Duke Schuyler (1931–1967)
- Alida Vázquez (1931–2018)
- Dorothy Ashby (1932–1986)
- Elaine Barkin (1932–2023)
- Betty Beath (born 1932)
- Diana Pereira Hay (born 1932)
- Marta Jiráčková (born 1932)
- Liu Zhuang (1932–2011)
- Tera de Marez Oyens (1932–1996)
- Pauline Oliveros (1932–2016)
- Lila Pradell (1932-2024)
- Éliane Radigue (1932-2026)
- B. J. Rosco (born 1932)
- Kilza Setti (born 1932)
- Gitta Steiner (1932–1990)
- Ruth Watson Henderson (born 1932)
- Dolores White (1932–2023)
- Pozzi Escot (born 1933)
- Ida Gotkovsky (1933–2025)
- Elena Karastoyanova (born 1933)
- Yoko Ono (born 1933)
- Charlotte Moorman (1933–1991)
- Maria Helena Rosas Fernandes (born 1933)
- Iris Sanguesa (born 1933)
- Rocio Sanz (1933–1993)
- Sharda (singer) (1933–2023)
- Alicia Urreta (1933–1987)
- Joan Dolores Wilson (born 1933)
- Huguang Xin (1933–2011)
- Norma Beecroft (1934–2024)
- Nicole Lachartre (1934–1992)
- Mary Mageau (1934–2020)
- Zhanneta Lazarevna Metallidi (1934–2019)
- Teresa Procaccini (born 1934)
- Beatrice Siegrist (born 1934)
- Alicia Terzian (born 1934)
- Arlene Zallman (1934–2006)
- Thérèse Brenet (born 1935)
- Biancamaria Furgeri (born 1935)
- Helen Gifford (born 1935)
- Kazuko Hara (1935–2014)
- Enid Luff (1935–2022)
- Jacqueline Nova (1935–1975)
- Clara Sinde Ramallal (born 1935)
- Gloria Roe (1935–2017)
- Mirjana Sistek-Djordjevic (born 1935)
- Julia Stilman-Lasansky (1935–2007)
- Ivana Marburger Themmen (born 1935)
- Mary Lynn Twombly (born 1935)
- Shirley Walker (1935–2006)
- Qiang Wang (born 1935)
- Mirjana Živković (1935–2020)
- Sieglinda Ahrens (born 1936)
- Izabella Arazova (born 1936)
- Monic Cecconi-Botella (1936–2025)
- Erika Radermacher (born 1936)
- Erika Fox (born 1936)
- Barbara Heller (born 1936)
- Trisutji Kamal (1936–2021)
- Sheila Mary Nelson (1936–2020)
- Jocy de Oliveira (born 1936)
- Vivian Adelberg Rudow (born 1936)
- Brunhilde Sonntag (1936–2002)
- Myra Brooks Turner (1936–2017)
- Keiko Abe (born 1937)
- Janet Beat (born 1937)
- Constança Capdeville (1937–1992)
- Delia Derbyshire (1937–2001)
- Beatriz Ferreyra (born 1937)
- Irina Odăgescu (born 1937)
- Katherine Hoover (1937–2018)
- Marta Lambertini (1937–2019)
- Claire Liddell (born 1937)
- Diana McIntosh (1937–2022)
- Kikuko Masumoto (born 1937)
- Bernadetta Matuszczak (1937–2021)
- Irma Ravinale (1937–2013)
- Sylvia Rickard (born 1937)
- Darinka Simic-Mitrovic (born 1937)
- Ann Southam (1937–2010)
- Inna Abramovna Zhvanetskaia (1937–2024)
- Isabelle Aboulker (born 1938)
- Maryanne Amacher (1938–2009)
- Francine Aubin (1938–2016)
- Elizabeth R. Austin (born 1938)
- Carla Bley (1936–2023)
- Ann Carr-Boyd (born 1938)
- Gloria Coates (1938–2023)
- Piera Pistono (born 1938)
- Patsy Rogers (born 1938)
- Micheline Coulombe Saint-Marcoux (1938–1985)
- Tona Scherchen (born 1938)
- Shakhida Shaimardanova (1938-2020)
- Mieko Shiomi (born 1938)
- Cornelia Tăutu (1938–2019)
- Joan Tower (born 1938)
- Betty Ann Wong (born 1938)
- Elinor Armer (born 1939)
- Wendy Carlos (born 1939)
- Marcelle Deschênes (born 1939)
- Lesya Dychko (born 1939)
- Maija Einfelde (born 1939)
- Jennifer Fowler (born 1939)
- Barbara Kolb (1938–2024)
- Annea Lockwood (born 1939)
- María Luisa Ozaita (1939–2017)
- Barbara Pointon (1939-2020)
- Katherine Teck (born 1939)
- Inger Wikström (born 1939)
- Margaret Lucy Wilkins (born 1939)
- Ellen Taaffe Zwilich (born 1939)

== 1940s ==
- Heidi Baader-Nobs (born 1940)
- Margaret Brouwer (born 1940)
- Graciela Castillo (born 1940)
- Eleanor Hovda (1940–2009)
- Maria Teresa Luengo (born 1940)
- Dorothy Rudd Moore (1940–2022)
- Graciela Paraskevaidis (1940–2017)
- Chitra Singh (born 1940)
- Awilda Villarini (born 1940)
- Eleni Karaindrou (born 1941)
- Judith Margaret Bailey (1941–2025)
- Anđelka Bego-Šimunić (1941–2022)
- Kay Gardner (1941–2002)
- Sorrel Hays (1941–2020)
- Moya Henderson (born 1941)
- Viera Janárčeková (1941–2023)
- Usha Khanna (born 1941)
- Edith Lejet (1941–2024)
- Ivana Loudová (1941–2017)
- Jenny Helen McLeod (1941–2022)
- Sook-Ja Oh (born 1941)
- Terry Winter Owens (1941–2007)
- Ferdousi Rahman (born 1941)
- Magaly Ruiz Lastres (born 1941)
- Dorothy Strutt (1941–2019)
- Elizabeth Walton Vercoe (born 1941)
- Gillian Whitehead (born 1941)
- Birgitte Alsted (born 1942)
- Silvana Di Lotti (born 1942)
- Canary Burton (born 1942)
- Helen Fisher (born 1942)
- Priscilla McLean (born 1942)
- Haruna Miyake (born 1942)
- Meredith Monk (born 1942)
- Kyungsun Suh (born 1942)
- Diane Thome (1942–2025)
- Solange Ancona (1943–2019)
- Christine Berl (born 1943)
- Michèle Bokanowski (born 1943)
- Joanna Bruzdowicz (1943–2021)
- Laura Clayton (born 1943)
- Eleanor Cory (born 1943)
- Margriet Ehlen (born 1943)
- Judy Klein (born 1943)
- Anne Lauber (born 1943)
- Tania León (born 1943)
- Marta Ptaszynska (born 1943)
- Michèle Reverdy (born 1943)
- Nicole Rodrigue (1943-2010)
- Dilorom Saidaminova (born 1943)
- Alice Shields (born 1943)
- Elżbieta Sikora (born 1943)
- Pril Smiley (born 1943)
- Iwonka Bogumila Szymanska (born 1943)
- Françoise Barrière (1944–2019)
- Ana Bofill Levi (born 1944)
- Gabriella Cecchi (born 1944)
- Tatyana Chudova (1944–2021)
- Gloria González (born 1944)
- Elsa Justel (born 1944)
- Beatriz Lockhart (1944–2015)
- Gabriela Moyseowicz (born 1944)
- Claire Renard (born 1944)
- Marisa Rezende (born 1944)
- Rhian Samuel (born 1944)
- Margaret Scoville (1944–1978)
- Silvia Sommer (born 1944)
- Graciela Agudelo (1945–2018)
- Maya Badian (born 1945)
- Gillian Bibby (1945–2023)
- Victoria Bond (born 1945)
- Dorothy Quita Buchanan (born 1945)
- Judith Ann Clingan (born 1945)
- Melanie Ruth Daiken (1945–2016)
- Graciane Finzi (born 1945)
- Ig Henneman (born 1945)
- Nagako Konishi (born 1945)
- Chan-Hae Lee (born 1945)
- Vânia Dantas Leite (1945–2018)
- Younghi Pagh-Paan (born 1945)
- Maggi Payne (born 1945)
- Elizabeth Raum (born 1945)
- Carol Sams (born 1945)
- Marielli Sfakianaki (born 1945)
- Laurie Spiegel (born 1945)
- Toyoko Takami (born 1945)
- Julia Usher (born 1945)
- Judith Lang Zaimont (born 1945)
- Barbara Benary (1946–2019)
- Renate Birnstein (born 1946)
- Anne Boyd (born 1946)
- Geneviève Calame (1946–1993)
- Suzanne Ciani (born 1946)
- Dora Draganova (born 1946)
- Tsippi Fleischer (born 1946)
- Janice Giteck (born 1946)
- Ann-Elise Hannikainen (1946–2012)
- Barbara Harbach (born 1946)
- Ho Wai-On (born 1946)
- Neva Krasteva (born 1946)
- Joyce Solomon Moorman (born 1946)
- Jane O'Leary (born 1946)
- Anna Rubin (born 1946)
- Claire Schapira (born 1946)
- Daria Semegen (born 1946)
- Marilyn Shrude (born 1946)
- Sheila Silver (born 1946)
- Annette Vande Gorne (born 1946)
- Joelle Wallach (born 1946)
- Hildegard Westerkamp (born 1946)
- Barbara Maria Zakrzewska-Nikiporczyk (1946–2023)
- Pınar Köksal (1946–2019)
- Liana Alexandra (1947–2011)
- Laurie Anderson (born 1947)
- Franghiz Ali-Zadeh (born 1947)
- Ruth Bakke (born 1947)
- Ada Gentile (born 1947)
- Mayako Kubo (born 1947)
- Joan La Barbara (born 1947)
- Nicola LeFanu (born 1947)
- Zarrina Mirshakar (born 1947)
- Vojna Nešić (born 1947)
- Rosica Petkova (born 1947)
- Grażyna Pstrokońska-Nawratil (born 1947)
- Faye-Ellen Silverman (born 1947)
- Valerie Vonpechy (born 1947)
- Hilary Tann (1947–2023)
- Karen Tarlow (born 1947)
- Gwyneth Van Anden Walker (born 1947)
- Susan Cohn Lackman (born 1947)
- Betty Rose Wishart (born 1947)
- Hsiung-Zee Wong (born 1947)
- Gisèle Barreau (born 1948)
- Diana Burrell (born 1948)
- Julia Cenova (1948–2010)
- Janet Graham (born 1948)
- Kerstin Jeppsson (born 1948)
- Christina Kubisch (born 1948)
- Junko Mori (born 1948)
- Ilza Nogueira (born 1948)
- Sally Johnston Reid (1948–2019)
- Shoshana Riseman (born 1948)
- Valerie Samson (born 1948)
- Ilona Sekacz (born 1948)
- Lyudmila Karpawna Shleh (born 1948)
- Bernadette Speach (born 1948)
- Ivana Stefanović (born 1948)
- Julia Tsenova (1948–2010)
- Carol Ann Weaver (born 1948)
- Jeanne Zaidel-Rudolph (born 1948)
- Eleanor Alberga (born 1949)
- Carol E Barnett (born 1949)
- Liona Boyd (born 1949)
- Ann Callaway (born 1949)
- Rachel Galinne (born 1949)
- Alexina Louie (born 1949)
- Odaline de la Martinez (born 1949)
- Zhanna Vasil'yevna Pliyeva (1948–2023)
- Shulamit Ran (born 1949)
- Angela Ro Ro (1949–2025)
- Sharon Ruchman (born 1949)
- Marjorie Rusche (born 1949)
- Ann Sandifur (born 1949)
- Kimi Sato (born 1949)
- Judith Shatin (born 1949)
- Marina Marta Vlad (born 1949)
- Rain Worthington (born 1949)
- Barbara York (1949-2020)

== 1950s ==
- Lejla Agolli (born 1950)
- Beth Anderson (born 1950)
- Édith Canat de Chizy (born 1950)
- Elena Firsova (born 1950)
- Åse Hedstrøm (born 1950)
- Yelena Sergeyevna Konshina (born 1950)
- Libby Larsen (born 1950)
- Elodie Lauten (1950–2014)
- Lam Manyee (born 1950)
- Vivienne Olive (born 1950)
- Synne Skouen (born 1950)
- Nancy Telfer (born 1950)
- Anneli Arho (born 1951)
- Beatriz Bilbao (born 1951)
- Karólína Eiríksdóttir (born 1951)
- Nancy Galbraith (born 1951)
- Halina Harelava (born 1951)
- Patricia Jünger (1951–2017)
- Joëlle Léandre (born 1951)
- Cecilia McDowall (born 1951)
- Liz Phillips (born 1951)
- Jeannie G. Pool (born 1951)
- Marcela Rodríguez (born 1951)
- Doina Rotaru (born 1951)
- Tat'yana Sergeyeva (born 1951)
- Elizabeth Swados (1951–2016)
- Lois V Vierk (born 1951)
- Kristi Allik (born 1952)
- Judith Bingham (born 1952)
- Helen Bowater (born 1952)
- Nicole Carignan (born 1952)
- Maya Ciobanu (born 1952)
- Tina Davidson (born 1952)
- Janet Dunbar (born 1952)
- Margriet Hoenderdos (1952–2010)
- Grażyna Krzanowska (born 1952)
- Runa Laila (born 1952)
- Bunita Marcus (born 1952)
- Alla Pavlova (born 1952)
- Kaija Saariaho (1952–2023)
- Jane Sinclair Wells (born 1952)
- Lettie Alston (born 1953)
- Avril Anderson (born 1953)
- Sonja Beets (born 1953)
- Josefina Benedetti (born 1953)
- Susan Morton Blaustein (born 1953)
- Wendy Mae Chambers (born 1953)
- Chen Yi (born 1953)
- Jody Diamond (born 1953)
- Violeta Dinescu (born 1953)
- Eibhlis Farrell (born 1953)
- Adriana Hölszky (born 1953)
- Anne LeBaron (born 1953)
- Cynthia Cozette Lee (born 1953)
- Anne Linnet (born 1953)
- Cindy McTee (born 1953)
- Lidia Zielińska (born 1953)
- Sylvie Bodorová (born 1954)
- Elisabetta Brusa (born 1954)
- Judith Cloud (born 1954)
- María Escribano (1954–2002)
- Susan Frykberg (1954–2023)
- Irina Hasnaş (born 1954)
- Birgit Havenstein (born 1954)
- Brenda Hutchinson (born 1954)
- Denise Kelly (born 1954)
- Hi Kyung Kim (born 1954)
- Renata Kunkel (born 1954)
- Bun-Ching Lam (born 1954)
- Pamela J. Marshall (born 1954)
- Ella Milch-Sheriff (born 1954)
- Betty Olivero (born 1954)
- Cecilie Ore (born 1954)
- Elizabeth Hayden Pizer (born 1954)
- Clare Shore (born 1954)
- Judith Weir (born 1954)
- Pearle Christian (born 1955)
- Eleanor Joanne Daley (born 1955)
- Susanne Erding-Swiridoff (born 1955)
- Elisenda Fabregas (born 1955)
- Diamanda Galás (born 1955)
- Gerda Geertens (born 1955)
- Anne La Berge (born 1955)
- Iryna Kyrylina (1953–2017)
- Lori Laitman (born 1955)
- Marilyn Mazur (born 1955)
- Anne Quigley (born 1955 or 1956)
- Marlyce Polk Reed (born 1955)
- Masguda Shamsutdinova (born 1955)
- Karmella Tsepkolenko (born 1955)
- Janika Vandervelde (born 1955)
- Regina Harris Baiocchi (born 1956)
- Sally Beamish (born 1956)
- Chiara Benati (born 1956)
- Eve de Castro-Robinson (born 1956)
- Deborah Drattell (born 1956)
- Anne Dudley (born 1956)
- Michelle Ekizian (born 1956)
- Madeleine Isaksson (born 1956)
- Joan Jeanrenaud (born 1956)
- Laura Kaminsky (born 1956)
- Paula M. Kimper (born 1956)
- Makiko Kinoshita (born 1956)
- Larysa Kuzmenko (born 1956)
- Mary McDonald (born 1956)
- Silvina Milstein (born 1956)
- Onutė Narbutaitė (born 1956)
- Marie Samuelsson (born 1956)
- Carla Scaletti (born 1956)
- Carolyn Steinberg (born 1956)
- Iris Szeghy (born 1956)
- Pamela Z (born 1956)
- Linda Bouchard (born 1957)
- Chaya Czernowin (born 1957)
- Ellen Fullman (born 1957)
- Regina Irman (born 1957)
- Elena Kats-Chernin (born 1957)
- Marcela Pavia (born 1957)
- Karin Rehnqvist (born 1957)
- Pan Shiji (born 1957)
- Linda Catlin Smith (born 1957)
- Joan Szymko (born 1957)
- Karen P. Thomas (born 1957)
- Melinda Wagner (born 1957)
- Janet Wheeler (born 1957)
- Juliana Hall (born 1958)
- Eve Beglarian (born 1958)
- Maura Bosch (born 1958)
- Rhona Clarke (born 1958)
- Zulema de la Cruz (born 1958)
- Beth Denisch (born 1958)
- Consuelo Díez (born 1958)
- Suzanne Giraud (born 1958)
- Juliana Hall (born 1958)
- Hanna Havrylets' (1958–2022)
- Miya Masaoka (born 1958)
- Shirley Thompson (born 1958)
- Errollyn Wallen (born 1958)
- Julia Wolfe (born 1958)
- Sinta Wullur (born 1958)
- Caroline Ansink (born 1959)
- Carola Bauckholt (born 1959)
- Ilona Breģe (born 1959)
- Sussan Deyhim (born ca. 1958)
- Marti Epstein (born 1959)
- Adina Izarra (born 1959)
- Laura Karpman (born 1959)
- Ana Lara (born 1959)
- Marianella Machado (born 1959)
- Hilda Paredes (born 1959)
- Tatyana Voronina (born 1959)
- Stevie Wishart (born 1959)
- Shimul Yousuf (born 1959)

== 1960s ==
- Maria de Alvear (born 1960)
- Sonia Bo (born 1960)
- Victoria Borisova-Ollas (born 1969)
- Yekaterina Chemberdzhi (born 1960)
- Andrea Clearfield (born 1960)
- Annie Gosfield (born 1960)
- Bára Grímsdóttir (born 1960)
- Jindra Nečasová Nardelli (born 1960)
- Priti Paintal (born 1960)
- Jocelyn Pook (born 1960)
- Rachel Portman (born 1960)
- Maria Schneider (born 1960)
- Ute Wassermann (born 1960)
- Ana-Maria Avram (born 1961)
- Enya (born 1961)
- Unsuk Chin (born 1961)
- Julie Giroux (born 1961)
- Hanna Kulenty (born 1961)
- Michiru Oshima (born 1961)
- Janet Owen Thomas (1961–2002)
- Lourdes Perez (born 1961)
- Isabel Soveral (born 1961)
- Karen Tanaka (born 1961)
- Carolyn Yarnell (born 1961)
- Sylvia Constantinidis (born 1962)
- Mary Finsterer (born 1962)
- Jennifer Higdon (born 1962)
- Amy X Neuburg (born 1962)
- Victoria Poleva (born 1962)
- Rosephanye Powell (born 1962)
- Lolita Ritmanis (born 1962)
- Laura Schwendinger (born 1962)
- Alex Shapiro (born 1962)
- Chen Shihui (born 1962)
- Bettina Skrzypczak (born 1962)
- Allison Cameron (born 1963)
- Keiko Fujiie (born 1963)
- Joelle Khoury (born 1963)
- Veronika Krausas (born 1963)
- Sophie Lacaze (born 1963)
- Ann Millikan (born 1963)
- Isabel Mundry (born 1963)
- Halyna Ovcharenko (born 1963)
- Lucia Ronchetti (born 1963)
- Elena Ruehr (born 1963)
- Calliope Tsoupaki (born 1963)
- Hana Vejvodová (1963–1994)
- Debbie Wiseman (born 1963)
- Michiru Yamane (born 1963)
- Julia Gomelskaya (1964–2016)
- Gao Hong (born 1964)
- Yoko Kanno (born 1964)
- Eva Noer Kondrup (born 1964)
- Gabriela Ortiz (born 1964)
- Sarah Peebles (born 1964)
- Annette Schlünz (born 1964)
- Augusta Read Thomas (born 1964)
- Mariana Villanueva (born 1964)
- Diane Wittry (born 1964)
- Jennifer Margaret Barker (born 1965)
- Carin Bartosch Edström (born 1965)
- Evelyn Glennie (born 1965)
- Björk Guðmundsdóttir (born 1965)
- Rozalie Hirs (born 1965)
- Yuki Kajiura (born 1965)
- Sofia Levkovskaya (1965–2011)
- Albena Petrovic-Vratchanska (born 1965)
- Charlotte Seither (born 1965)
- Georgia Spiropoulos (born 1965)
- Dorothy Hindman (born 1966)
- Melissa Hui (born 1966)
- Liza Lim (born 1966)
- Gráinne Mulvey (born 1966)
- Lauren Bernofsky (born 1967)
- Deirdre Gribbin (born 1967)
- Þuríður Jónsdóttir (born 1967)
- Yukie Nishimura (born 1967)
- Rebecca Saunders (born 1967)
- Yoko Shimomura (born 1967)
- Katia Tiutiunnik (born 1967)
- Isidora Žebeljan (1967–2020)
- Laura Andel (born 1968)
- Lisa Bielawa (born 1968)
- Kerani (born 1968)
- Vanessa Lann (born 1968)
- Elainie Lillios (born 1968)
- Sarah MacDonald (musician) (born 1968)
- Olga Neuwirth (born 1968)
- Roxanna Panufnik (born 1968)
- Ana Sokolovic (born 1968)
- Anjelika Akbar (born 1969)
- Johanna Doderer (born 1969)
- Jocelyn Morlock (1969–2023)

== 1970s ==
- Siobhán Cleary (born 1970)
- Valerie Coleman (born 1970)
- Graziella Concas (born 1970)
- Marzena Komsta (born 1970)
- Chihchun Chi-sun Lee (born 1970)
- Lotta Wennäkoski (born 1970)
- Marina Leonardi (born 1970)
- Arlene Sierra (born 1970)
- Aleksandra Vrebalov (born 1970)
- Malika Kishino (born 1971)
- Soe Tjen Marching (born 1971)
- Katharina Rosenberger (born 1971)
- Ingrid Stölzel (born 1971)
- Jessica Grace Wing (1971–2003)
- Natasha Barrett (born 1972)
- Emily Doolittle (born 1972)
- Amber Ferenz (born 1972)
- Gabriela Lena Frank (born 1972)
- Hiba Kawas (born 1972)
- Analia Llugdar (born 1972)
- Deborah Lurie (born 1972)
- Nkeiru Okoye (born 1972)
- Helena Tulve (born 1972)
- Zoe Keating (born 1972)
- Lera Auerbach (born 1973)
- Jessica Curry (born 1973)
- Tansy Davies (born 1973)
- Amanda Harberg (born 1973)
- Sungji Hong (born 1973)
- Amy Scurria (born 1973)
- Sarah Kirkland Snider (born 1973)
- Luna Pearl Woolf (born 1973)
- Selma Björnsdóttir (born 1974)
- Ellen C. Covito (born 1974)
- Meri von KleinSmid (born 1974)
- Ailís Ní Ríain (born 1974)
- Sophie Viney (born 1974)
- Jennifer Walshe (born 1974)
- Dalit Warshaw (born 1974)
- Hyo-Won Woo (born 1974)
- Kati Agócs (born 1975)
- Eugenia Manolidou (born 1975)
- Linda Martinez (1975–2005)
- Raminta Šerkšnytė (born 1975)
- Annelies Van Parys (born 1975)
- Svitlana Azarova (born 1976)
- Rita Kassabian (born 1976)
- Catherine Kontz (born 1976)
- Andrea Reinkemeyer (born 1976)
- Wang Ying (born 1976)
- Hafdís Bjarnadóttir (born 1977)
- Karola Obermueller (born 1977)
- Tanya Ekanayaka (born 1977)
- Deborah Pritchard (born 1977)
- Jennifer Thomas (pianist) (born 1977)
- Anna S. Þorvaldsdóttir (Thorvaldsdottir) (born 1977)
- Du Yun (born 1977)
- Wu Fei (born 1977)
- Kerry Andrew (born 1978)
- Justine Electra (born 1978)
- Emily Hall (born 1978)
- Vanessa-Mae (born 1978)
- Anna Meredith (born 1978)
- Agata Zubel (born 1978)
- Clarice Assad (born 1978)
- Annesley Black (born 1979)
- Emily Howard (born 1979)
- Kate Moore (born 1979)

== 1980s ==
- Abbie Betinis (born 1980)
- Anna Clyne (born 1980)
- Andrea Datzman (born 1980)
- Cheryl Frances-Hoad (born 1980)
- Wang Jie (born 1980)
- Maria Huld Markan Sigfúsdóttir (born 1980)
- Dobrinka Tabakova (born 1980)
- Missy Mazzoli (born 1980)
- Sarah Nemtsov (born 1980)
- Helen Grime (born 1981)
- Hannah Lash (born 1981)
- Angélica Negrón (born 1981)
- Charlotte Bray (born 1982)
- Hildur Guðnadóttir (born 1982)
- Natalie Ann Holt (born 1982)
- Shibani Kashyap (born 1982)
- Catherine Lamb (born 1982)
- Jessie Montgomery (born 1982)
- Caroline Shaw (born 1982)
- M. M. Srilekha (born 1982)
- Ann Cleare (born 1983)
- Reena Esmail (born 1983)
- Sneha Khanwalkar (1983)
- Sarah Hutchings (born 1984)
- Sasha Siem (born 1984)
- Cristina Spinei (born 1984)
- Dafina Zeqiri (born 1984)
- Isobel Waller-Bridge (born 1984)
- Raquel García-Tomás (born 1984)
- Nina C. Young (born 1984)
- Zosha Di Castri (born 1985)
- Alissa Firsova (born 1986)
- Cevanne Horrocks-Hopayian (born 1986)
- Pippa Cleary (born 1986)
- Kathryn Salfelder (born 1987)
- Shiva Feshareki (born 1987)
- Julia Adolphe (born 1988)
- Andrea Casarrubios (born 1988)
- Cecilia Damström (born 1988)
- Sarah Lianne Lewis (born 1988)
- Bára Gísladóttir (born 1989)
- Sabrina Ljungberg (born 1989)
- Elizabeth Ogonek (born 1989)
- Freya Waley-Cohen (born 1989)

== 1990s ==
- Sonya Belousova (born 1990)
- Anja Plaschg (born 1990)
- Hilary Purrington (born 1990)
- Lucy Armstrong (born 1991)
- Jasmine Arielle Barnes (born 1991)
- Georgia Koumará (born 1991)
- Diana Ringo (born 1992)
- Anna Appleby (born 1993)
- Dani Howard (born 1993)
- Lillie Harris (born 1994)
- Grace-Evangeline Mason (born 1994)

== 2000s ==
- Emily Bear (born 2001)
- Alma Deutscher (born 2005)

== Unknown ==
- Winifred Phillips (living; born in the 20th century)
- Yuka Tsujiyoko (living; born in the 20th century)

== See also ==
- List of Australian women composers
- Lists of composers
- List of 20th-century classical composers
- List of women film score composers
- Trobairitz women troubadours
- Category:Women composers
- Women in music
