= Clementine de Bourges =

French composer

Clementine de Bourges (Unknown date – 30 September 1561) was a French composer. She was born and died in Lyon.

Accounts affirmed that Clementine mastered several instruments. However, biographical information about her life is scarce. She is mostly known through her prolific compositions of classical music. She excelled in choral works and organic music. Mathematician and music writer Franz Gehring considered her compositions to be some of the most important of her time. She died one year after her husband had died fighting against the Huguenots in 1560.
