= Therese Wittman =

French composer

Therese Wittman (1869–1942) was a French composer. She wrote piano and vocal music, which was published by Ascherberg, Hopwood & Crew Ltd; Casa Ricordi; and Emile Leduc P Bertrand & Cie.

== Works ==
Her works include:

=== Piano ===
- Air de Ballet
- Au Fil de l'Eau
- Baby Dollar
- Dear Alice (dance)
- Fleur d'Hiver (waltz)
- Historiete Petit Valse
- Je t'Adore
- Laments (waltz)
- Maman, souvenir (march)
- March des Jolies Parisiennes
- March Ecossaise
- Petit Rondo
- Valse Triomphale

=== Vocal ===
- Bateau des Amours
- Du Coeur (words by Henri De Gorse, music by Thérèse Wittman)
- Pauv' Boscotte
- Sorellina
- Trois Petites Misses
