= Leonie Tonel =

French pianist and composer

Léonie Antoinette Tonel (20 April 1828 – 14 January 1886) was a French pianist and composer.

Tonel studied music at the Paris Conservatory, where the jury was so impressed by her performance that they unanimously awarded her a certificate without a competitive exam. In 1855, La Presse wrote, "Mlle Léonie Tonèl will be heard at the Exposition [Universelle des produits de l'Agriculture, de l'Industrie et des Beaux-Arts de Paris 1855] on Tuesdays, Thursdays, and Fridays, from 2 PM until 5 PM, on the excellent piano from the house of A. Bord.".

Tonel composed works for piano in many styles, which were published in Europe and America by Duncan Davison & Co., G. Schirmer Inc., J. L. Peters, Oliver Ditson, and Schott Music. Many of Tonel's individual compositions were included in collections. There were some discrepancies in opus numbers between her European and American publishers, noted below. Her compositions for piano, using opus numbers through 55, included:

- A l'aventure. Caprice, opus 20
- A tes genoux. Prière, opus 10
- Alice. Mazurka
- Astre des nuits. Berceuse, opus 21
- Au bord de l'eau. Nocturne, opus 19
- Au déclin du jour. Nocturne, opus 3
- Au gré des flots. Barcarolle, opus 7
- Bolero
- Bridal Gifts. Valse
- Cascades et ruisseaux. Grande valse, opus 6
- Chant d'amour. Barcarolle, opus 37
- Chateaux en Espagne. Fantasie Bolero, opus 23
- Columbia Galop
- Dames et Chevaliers. Polka-Mazurka, opus 18
- Douce ivresse! Valse brillante, opus 38
- Deep in my Heart
- Dors mignonne. Berceuse, opus 55
- Drifting with the Tide
- Driven from Home. Valse de salon
- Echos du bal. Impromptu-Mazurka, opus 22
- Étincelant – Sparkling. Polka
- Farewell!
- Fête au village. Ronde, opus 15
- Fleur des champs. Valse de salon
- Gabrielle. Galop di Bravura
- Galop de bravoure, opus 52
- Galop-Etude, opus 16
- God Bless the Little Church
- Good-bye, but come again
- Good-bye, Old Home. Meditation
- Grande valse, opus 37
- I said to my Love. Idylle
- Inquiétude, opus 34
- Kiss me Good-Night, Mamma
- La chasse
- La coupe en main. Brindisi, Opus 27
- La Manola – Sweet Love, arise
- La petite Fadette. Scène champêtre, opus 40; also listed as opus 41
- La sauterelle. Polka-Mazurka, opus 4
- Le Bosphore. Caprice, opus 12
- Le Bourg de Batz. Danse bretonne, opus 40
- Le Vallon. Méditation
- Loin du bruit. Rêverie, Opus 29 (I); also listed as opus 31
- Lovely Maiden. Quartet. Rigoletto
- Madaline. Polka
- Madrid. Bolero, opus 8
- Marche triomphale, opus 36
- Menuet de Haydn, opus 29
- Menuet, opus 31
- Murmuring Waves (transcription of G. W. Scott's song The Lone Rock by the Sea)
- My dear old sunny Home (reverie on melody by Will S. Hay)
- My Father's Home
- My Southern Sunny Home
- Neptune Grand March
- Nobody's Darling
- Ombres et rayons. Caprice-Polka, opus 14
- Only a Little Flower. Mazurka
- Pendant la valse. Scène dramatique, opus 26
- Perles et Diamans. Mazurka, opus 2
- Pianto. Élégie, opus 24
- Plainte des Fleurs
- Rayonnement. Valse, opus 30
- Rien sans toi!, opus 11
- Romance sans paroles, opus 35
- Romeo and Juliet Waltz
- Ronde des matelots. Caprice, opus 9
- Rose pompon. Mazurka
- Scherzo, opus 33
- See how the pale Moon shineth. Nocturne
- Separation
- Sighing Billows. Fantaisie
- Sleep sweetly, Love, and well. Lullaby
- Solo de Concert. opus 21
- Spring and Autumn. Tyrolienne
- Stamboul! Mazurka, opus 5
- Sweet Thoughts. Nocturne
- Take me home. March
- Toast. Brindise
- Transports. Valse caprice, opus 41
- Truly Yours. Idylle
- Une nuit à Grenade. Sérénade, opus 13
- Vision. Romance sans paroles, Opus 28
- Warrior's Dream. Grande Marche

Download free scores by Leonie Tonel at the International Music Score Library Project (IMSLP)
