= Soledad Bengoecha de Cármena =

Spanish composer

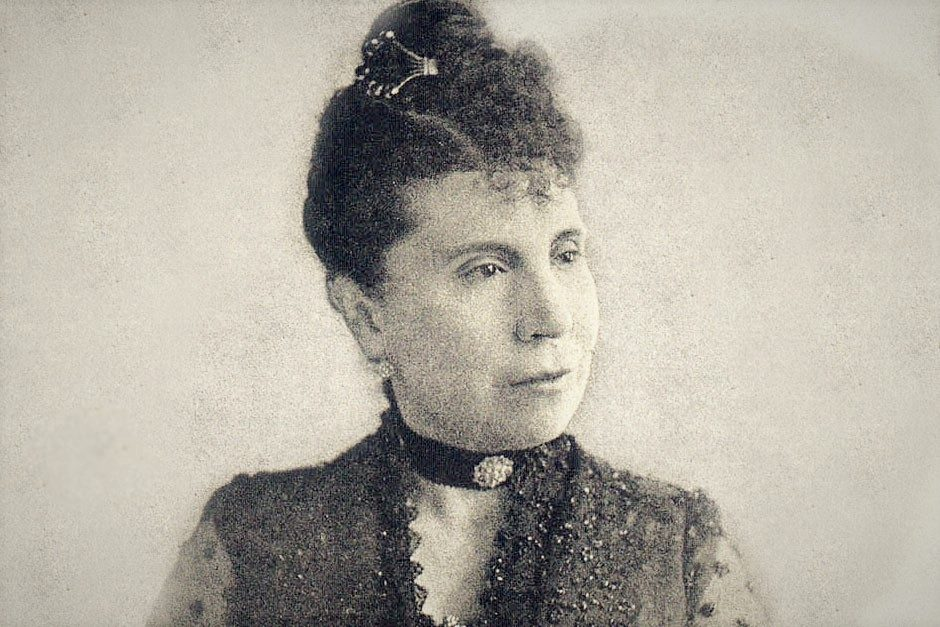
Soledad Bengoecha de Cármena

Soledad Bengoechea de Cármena (21 March 1849 – 1893) was a Spanish composer. She was born in Madrid, and studied music with Arriola, Jesús de Monasterio and Nicolás Rodríguez Ledesma. She died in Madrid.

== Works ==
Selected works include:

- Flor de los cielos, zarzuela (1894)
- El gran día, zarzuela (1894)
- A la fuerza ahorcan, zarzuela (1876)
- Sybille, overture (1873)
- Mass (1867)
- Marcha triunfal
