= Marielli Sfakianaki =

Greek writer, singer, and composer

Marielli Sfakianaki-Manolidou
- Born: Marielli Sfakianaki; 12 January 1945 (age 81); Athens, Greece
- Education: Athens Conservatory
- Occupation: Composer
- Father: Kostas Sfakianakis

Marielli Sfakianaki-Manolidou (born 12 January 1945) is a Greek writer, singer and composer.

== Biography ==
Marielli Sfakianaki was born in Athens, Greece, the daughter of Cretan pianist, composer and musicologist Kostas Sfakianakis. She studied vocal music and graduated from the Athens Conservatory in 1971. Her daughter is composer Tatiana Manolidou.

== Works ==
Sfakianaki composes opera, orchestral and sacred choral music. Selected works include:

- To mikro kai to megalo i kai t' antitheta
- The MINOS opera
- Cretan tale opera

She wrote the novel Echoes which received an award from the Society of Greek Writers in 1984.
