= Consuelo Díez =

Consuelo Díez Fernández (born 16 August 1958) is a Spanish electroacoustic composer.

== Life ==
Consuelo Díez was born in Madrid, Spain, and studied at the Royal Conservatory of Music in Madrid with Anton Garcia Abril and Roman Alis. She also studied art history at the Universidad Complutense de Madrid, and graduated with a Master of Arts from Hartt School of Music (USA) and a Doctorate in Musical Arts from Hartford University (USA).

After completing her studies, Diez returned to work as a composer in Madrid. She taught music at the Conservatory in Madrid and served for five years as the director of the Center for Diffusion of Contemporary Music. Diez is married and has two children.

== Works ==
Selected works include:

- El precio
- Sad for piano
- Sein und Zeit for piano
- Se ha parado el aire for piano
- Endurance for piano
- Pasión Cautiva for orchestra
- La Geometría del Agua for orchestra
- Iliverir for orchestra
- Life for orchestra
- Cartas a la oscuridad Andantino - Allegro - Allegretto - Presto
- Dos Canciones
- Jungle city
- Ecos
- Verde y Negro for flute and piano'sax and piano
- Se ha parado el aire for piano
- Preludio en el Jardín
- Rumores del Puerto for piano
- Cuatro Instantes theme with variations
- Niña valiente for soprano, flute, cello and piano
- Infierno Azul
- EL azul está prohibido
- Libertad Real
- Magma for piano and electroacoustic
- Trío Gala de Madrid chamber trio for flute, cello and piano
