= Eva Saito-Noda =

Canadian composer, pianist and teacher

Eva Saito-Noda (25 June 1921 – 6 September 2004) was a Canadian composer, pianist and teacher who studied in America and taught in America, Canada, and Japan. She published her music under the name Eva Saito.

Saito-Noda was born in Edmonton, Alberta, Canada, to Fuku Kaneko and Taimon Saito. She married Richard Kenji Noda. Saito-Noda earned a B.S. in music education from Columbia University; a Master of Sacred Music from Union Theological Seminary; and a Dalcroze Certificate from the Dalcroze School in New York.

Saito-Noda taught music in Canada, Japan, and the United States. The Ohio State Music Teachers Association awarded her Composer of the Year in 1976. She died at her home in Wailuku, Hawaii.

Some of Saito-Noda’s compositions were published by Frank E. Warren Music. Her compositions include:

== Chamber ==
- For the Children of War: Three Tankas, opus 2 (for flute and harpsichord or piano; also arranged for three voices)
- Gentle Swaying of the Graceful Reeds (flute)
- Sonatine, opus 5 (violin, oboe and piano)
- Still Waters: Four Tankas, opus 6 (flute)
- Tanka (flute, oboe and guitar or flute and harpsichord)
- Two Tankas (flute)

== Harpsichord ==
- From the Lacquer Box: Tankas for Harpsichord, opus 4

== Vocal ==
- “For the Children of War: Three Tankas, opus 2” (three voices; also arranged for flute and harpsichord or piano)

- Listen to music by Eva Saito
