= Silvia Sommer =

Austrian composer, pianist

- Born: 9 April 1944 (age 82); Vienna, Austria
- Education: Vienna Music Academy
- Occupations: Pianist and composer

Silvia Sommer (born 9 April 1944) is an Austrian composer, pianist and music producer.

== Biography ==
Silvia Sommer was born in Vienna, Austria, into a composing family. She began playing piano at three and composed her first piece at eleven.

She studied piano with Marianne Lauda and Joseph Dichler at the Vienna Music Academy, and she studied composition with Alfred Uhl.

After completing her studies she worked as a pianist and composer. Her music has been performed and broadcast internationally.

== Selected awards ==
She has received awards for her work, including the City of Vienna composition prize (1970) as well as the Lower Austria prize (1982).

== Selected works ==
Sommer composes for choir, orchestra, solo instrument and chamber ensemble. She writes songs, light music, and music for film soundtracks. Her works have been recorded and issued on CD including:

- Klaviernacht - Piano Works By Women Composers (1996) Bayer Records
- Esoteric - Extreme Sacrifice
