= Marzena Komsta =

Polish composer

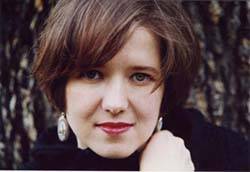
Marzena Komsta

Marzena Komsta (born 7 February 1970) is a Polish composer of contemporary music who resides in France.

== Life and career ==
Marzena Komsta was born in Gdynia, Poland, and studied composition at the S. Moniuszko Academy of Music in Gdańsk and at the F. Chopin Academy of Music in Warsaw under W. Kotonski and Z. Baginski. She continued her studies at the Higher National Conservatory of Music in Lyon under Philippe Manoury and D. Lorraine in acoustic, electroacoustic and computer music, and in Paris at IRCAM for doctoral training in music and 20th century musicology. Her music has been performed internationally and is available as recordings.

== Awards ==
- 1993 Witold Lutoslawski grant
- 2003 Villa Kujoyama in Kyoto
- 1999 ”Manuel Valcárcel“ International piano composition competition in Santander, Spain
- Fellowship Academy of Warsaw award winner
- Nadia and Lili Boulanger Foundation award winner
- Witold Lutoslawski Foundation award winner

== Works ==
Komsta composes both instrumental and electroacoustic works. Selected compositions include:

- "Tempus logicæ" for piano, percussion and electronics (Nowicki Duo - Festival Musica Polonica Nova, Wrocław, Poland, 2026)
- "Duo-logues" for two bass clarinets - commissioned by the Compagnie Les Arts-Boutants (2025)
- "Vocalia" for sopran, tenor and electronics - commissioned by Baltic Opera, Gdansk, Poland (Festival Futurofonia Premieres 2025)
- “Sequentia” for amplified string quartet and electronics (2024)
- “In death I found life” for Sopran, Alt, clarinet and piano (2023)
- “Ad lucem” for 12-voices female choir (2022)
- "Stelfer" for ensemble and electronics (2014 - commissioned by Adam Mickiewicz Institut for Ensemble 2e2m)
- "Tamashii no soko kara" (From the depths of the soul) for shakuhachi - 2007
- "Dream" XXV - for piano, voice, sound objects and electroacoustic system in real time (control Musica Festival Polonica Nova, 2006)
- "Desire" for tape (2005)
- "The field of my dreams" for piano, unusual sound objects and computer (2003 Kujoyama Villa, Kyoto, Japan)
- "Thoughts" - 7 short pieces for vibrafon (2002)
- "Journal burst" to sekstuor (2001 - commissioned by Musica Festival in Strasbourg for the Accroche Note Ensemble)
- "Night / Portrait" for sinfonietta (2001 - commissioned by the Ensemble Rhizome in collaboration with the Museum of Fine Arts of Rennes)
- "Primary... human" for harpsichord (2000 - commissioned by Festival Appointment New Music Forbach for Elisabeth Chojnacka)
- "Oh! - In the shadows" for cl, soprano, perc, vn and vc (2000 - commissioned by the Ensemble Suo Tempore)
- "To you, my love - a cruel piece" for piano (1997-1998)
- "LFDLC" ("F of the C") for a piano and three pianists (1996),
- "... You know?" For flute, percussion and harpsichord amplified small orchestra, band and computer system in real time (1995)
- "Brown" for violin (1994)
- "Agmen" for chamber orchestra (1993 - commissioned by De Orkestr Ereprijs)
- "Oqivian" for tape (1993)
- "Hard Day" for three percussionists (1992)
- "For Unwanted Prometheuses" for large symphony orchestra (1991 - commissioned by "The Way" Festival of Young Composers in Gdańsk)
- "HO-YI-A" for amplified violin and harpsichord (1991), "Kirp" for string quartet (1990)
- "Gryzaczek" for twelve brass (1990)
- "Five Miniatures" for piano (1990)
- "Nobody Knows the Day" for mixed choir (1989)
- "Oberek" for piano (1988).

== Discography ==
- "Agmen" for chamber orchestra, "Warsaw Autumn 1995 No. 5" De Orkestr Ereprijs, dir. Wim Boerman
- "Oqivian" for tape, "Warsaw Autumn 2001 No. 5"
- "Languor" for piano - version jazz quartet: Contemporary Quartet, Not Two MW 744-2, 2002
- "Night/Portrait" for sinfonietta; "Warsaw Autumn 2003 n o 1 "Set Algorithm, dir. Marco Angius
- "Desire" for tape, CD + DVD "Olter" Polskie Radio 2005 PRCD496/PRDVD 496A
- "Tamashii no soko kara" ("From the depths of the soul") for shakuhachi, Sozan C. Kariya - shakuhachi, *"Japan: Shakuhachi & Koto" Air Mail Music 2008, ASIN B0015NQBFO
- "Tamashii no soko kara", Sôzan C. Kariya – shakuhachi, CD "A Journay Around The World" Air Mail Music 2010, SA142002
