= Mathilde Ringelsberg =

Mathilde Ringelsberg (29 December 1813 — 2 February 1877) was a Czech composer and piano teacher. She was born in Bohemia (today the Czech Republic). She wrote waltzes and dances for piano through at least opus 45.

Little is known about Ringelsberg’s education or personal life. One of her polkas was awarded third prize in an 1847 dance music competition in Prague. She dedicated at least one work to Caroline Campione. Her music was published by Marco Barro, Christoph & Kuhe, J. Hoffmann, and C. A. Spina.

Her works for piano included:

- Knall-Kugerl'n
- Reverie Musicale, opus 43
- Sans Souci
- Tambour Polka, opus 45
