= Piera Pistono =

Italian pianist and composer

Piera Pistono (born 15 July 1938) is an Italian pianist and composer. She was born in Bangkok, Thailand, and studied music in Rome, graduating with a degree in piano, choral music and choral conducting. After completing her studies, she took a teaching position at the Conservatory of Santa Cecilia.

== Works ==
Selected works include:

- Piano Sonata (1983)
- Guitar Slides (1987)
- ESP for clarinet and piano (1990)
- Tokamak for ensemble (1992)
- Parameters of the parties for voice, flute, clarinet, cello (1992)
- Song of the bread for mezzo-soprano, flute and cello (2002)
- Ignorabimus for chorus and orchestra (1992)

Her works have been recorded and issued on CD.
