= Rocío Sanz Quirós =

Costa Rican composer

Rocío Sanz Quirós (1934–1993) was a Costa Rican composer. She was born in San José, Costa Rica and completed her music education in California and at the Tchaikovsky Conservatory in Moscow. She lived and worked in Mexico after 1953.

== Works ==
Sanz Quirós composed chamber music and orchestral works and also for plays and ballets. Her best known work is Cantata de la Independencia. Selected works include:

- Come in to these golden sands (in Three Songs of Ariel (The Tempest)) (Text: after William Shakespeare)
- A pair of eyes (Text: Félix Rubén García Sarmiento)
- Cabanavenú (in Five songs for children) (Text: Carlos Luis Sáenz)
- Bell (in song of the night) (Text: Rocío Sanz Quirós)
- Bell (in Five songs for children) (Text: Carlos Luis Sáenz)
- The widow Song Shin (Scene 7) (in Five songs of Brecht (The Good Woman of Setzuan)) (Text: after Bertolt Brecht)
- Sad song of the evening (Scene 3) (in Five songs of Brecht (The Good Woman of Setzuan)) (Text: after Bertolt Brecht)
- Shen-you song to the gods (in Five songs of Brecht (The Good Woman of Setzuan)) (Text: after Bertolt Brecht)
- Water Song (in Five songs of Brecht (The Good Woman of Setzuan)) (Text: after Bertolt Brecht)
- Bee which the petals (in Three Songs of Ariel (The Tempest)) (Text: after William Shakespeare)
- Nursery (in Five songs for children) (Text: Carlos Luis Sáenz)
- Your father (in Three Songs of Ariel (The Tempest)) (Text: after *William Shakespeare)
- Entracte sung - becomes Shenta Shui-ta (in Five songs of Brecht (The Good Woman of Setzuan)) (Text: after Bertolt Brecht)
- Epilogue - Solo Guitar (in song of the night) (Text: Rocío Sanz Quirós)
- The night whispers (in song of the night) (Text: Rocío Sanz Quirós)
- The bells of San Juan (in Five songs for children) (Text: Carlos Luis Sáenz)
- Night (in Five summer songs)
- Proclamation (in Five summer songs)
- Prologue (guitar) and night friend (in song of the night) (Text: Rocío Sanz Quirós)
- Only by singing (in Five songs for children) (Text: Carlos Luis Sáenz)
- I'm the summer (in Five summer songs)
- Night time (in song of the night) (Text: Rocío Sanz Quirós)
- Torment (in Five summer songs)
- Long summer (in Five summer songs)

Her work has been recorded and issued on CD, including:

- La Noche: Modern Mexican Choral Masterpieces Audio CD (1995)
