= Alice Samter =

German music educator and composer

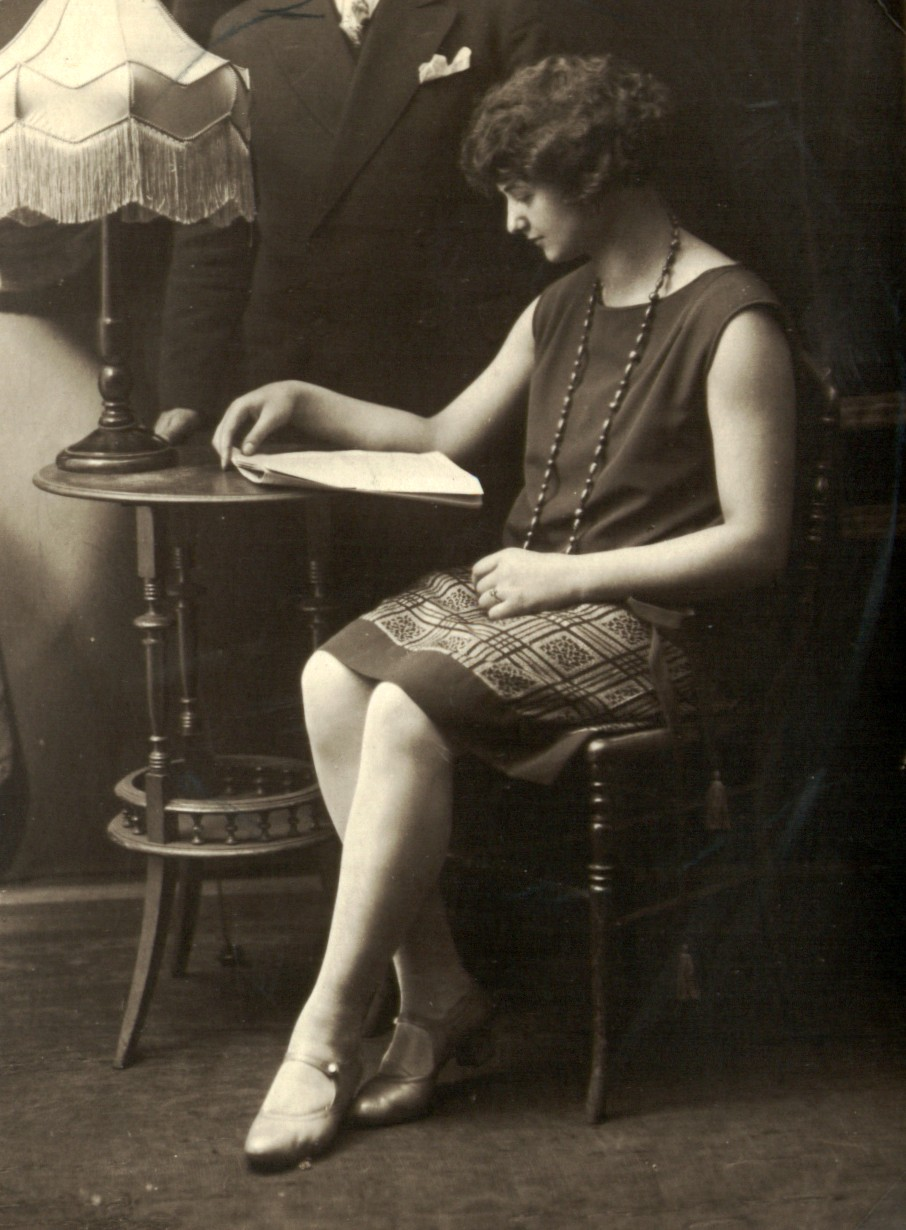
Alice Samter in 1928

Alice Samter (11 June 1908 – 19 March 2004) was a German music educator and composer.

== Biography ==
Alice Samter was born in Berlin to a middle-class family. She trained and worked as an accountant while studying piano, improvisation, choral work and school music at Klindworth-Scharwenka Conservatory and the Academy of Music in Berlin. In 1945 she received a degree in music and became a teacher in the Spandau schools where she began to compose school opera. After she retired from teaching in 1970, she became a composer full-time. She was a member of several organizations of composers, including GEDOK Berlin, the International Working Group on Women and Music and the International League of Woman Composers (USA). Her work has been performed internationally, and in 1988 she was awarded the Federal Cross of Merit.

In 1999 she established the Alice Samter Foundation at the Berlin University of the Arts to support music students at the university. She also donated funds to the Berlin State Library for the purchase of Clara Schumann and Fanny Mendelssohn manuscripts.

Samter's family home was destroyed by a bomb during the war and she moved with her mother and adopted sister to an apartment in Charlottenburg where she continued to live for the rest of her life. She was the subject of documentary films through West German Broadcasting (WDR), and her papers are housed in the Berlin State Library. She wrote her last song in 2003.

== Works ==
Alice Samter's compositions include choral music, chamber music, six opera, three school opera, piano works and solo vocal music with instrumental accompaniment. Selected works include:

- The ideal woman (Margaret Gottlieb), (1988), three-part choral song
- Freedom, equality, fraternity (1988) Cantata for mixed choir, alto, flute, clarinet, trumpet, cello, double bass and percussion
- Two choirs (1986) 4 for mixed voices: The monkeys (Wilhelm Busch) - The Snuff Box (Joachim Ringelnatz)
- We saved (Nelly Sachs), (1970) for female choir, violin, cello and piano
