= Virginie Morel-du Verger =

French pianist, music teacher and composer

Jeanne Virginie Morel du Verger (Christiane) (1799 – 17 December 1870) was a French pianist, music teacher and composer.

Virginie Morel was born in Metz, and studied with Louis Adam at the Paris Conservatoire in 1814 where she received first prize in piano. She later continued her studies with Ferdinand Hummel and became pianist to the Duchess de Berry. She married the Lieutenant Colonel of Staff, Baron du Verger in 1829, and composed a Piano Sonata, eight etudes, three duets for violin and piano and similar chamber works.

She died at her husband's property the Chateau du Verger.
