= Mara Petrova =

Bulgarian pianist, writer and composer

Mara Petrova (Bulgarian: Мара Петрова) (1921–1997) was a Bulgarian pianist, writer and composer born in Sliven, Bulgaria. She studied composition at the State Academy of Music with Vesselin Stoyanov, piano with Pancho Vladigerov, and choral conducting with Marin Goleminov. After completing her studies, she took a position teaching at the Institute for Music and Choreographic Specialists. Petrova also published articles on music and worked as a composer.

== Works ==
Petrova composed for theater, orchestra, chamber ensemble, instruments and choir. Selected works include:

- Podranilo (Early Bird) children's operetta
- Youth Suite (1953) for orchestra
- My Fatherland Overture for orchestra
- Dance-Poem (1966) for orchestra
- Symphony “April 1876” (1981) for orchestra
- Youth Suite for strings and timpani
- Triptych for voice, strings and small drum
- The Blue-Eyed Girl for voice and string orchestra
- Lullaby for voice and string orchestra
- Sonata for violin and piano
- Sofia Suite for oboe, clarinet, bassoon and small drum
- Dance for three bassoons
- Sketches for wind trio
- Song and Scherzo for flute and piano
- Scherzo for clarinet and piano
- Sonata and Theme with Variations
- Legend about the Apostle
- Hristo Botev choral
- Winter Tale choral
- Poem for my Native Town choral
- Bulgaria, lyrics by Hristo Chernaev
