= Louise Geneviève de La Hye =

French pianist, organist and composer (1807-1838)

Louise Geneviève de La Hye née Rousseau (7 March 1807 - 18 November 1838) was a French pianist, organist and composer, who sometimes used the pseudonym M. Leon Saint-Amans.

== Life and career ==
Louise Geneviève Rousseau was born in Charenton, France, on March 7, 1807. She was the daughter of Marie-Anne Noblot and of the musician Charles-Louis Rousseau, therefore the grand niece of philosopher Jean-Jacques Rousseau. She studied piano with her father and with Louis Joseph Saint-Amans, and in 1821 entered the Paris Conservatory.

Rousseau began teaching at the Conservatory in 1830, but moved to Cambrai after she married with the marquis Chaumont de la Hye. She had two children and returned to Paris in 1834 where she continued teaching and composing. She suffered from poor health and died in Paris at the age of 31.

== Works ==
La Hye composed works including an opera, cantatas, masses, piano works, duos and string quartets. Selected compositions include:

- Le songe de la religieuse
- Six mélodies italiennes

Her Méthode d'orgue expressif was published after her death, en 1839.

=== Romances ===
- Le Corsaire rouge !, lyrics by M. de la Hye
- Chant du crépuscule, lyrics by Victor Hugo, in La Gazette des salons, 1835
- Élégie dramatique, in La Gazette des salons, 1 January 1836
- Je suis maudit !, lyrics by Félix Servan, 1836
- Je l'ai tué !, lyrics by M. de la Hye, in La Gazette des salons, 25 December 1836
- Ne me plains pas, lyrics by Marceline Desbordes-Valmore, in La Gazette des salons, #74, 1836
