= Ho Wai-On =

Ho Wai-On (Ann-Kay Lin) (born 1946, Hong Kong) is an Anglo-Chinese composer.

== Biography ==
Ann-Kay Lin grew up in Hong Kong, and studied at the Royal Academy of Music in London on a John Swire Scholarship. She studied singing and composition, and piano with Max Pirani. A wrist injury ended her career as a concert pianist, and she turned to composition instead.

Ann-Kay Lin is included in the British Music Collection online.

== Works ==
Ann-Kay Lin has composed for dance, ballet, chamber ensemble, instrumental and voice performance. Selected works include:

- Sakura Variations (1974 revised 2000)
- Four Love Songs in Chinese (1974 revised 2000)
- Permutation (1996)
- Tai Chi (1977)
- To You (1977 revised 2000)
- Farewell, My Beloved (1982)
- Bulldozers, Old House and Old Banyan (1990 revised 1999)
- Let’s Sing "Magic Banyan Tree" (2002)

Her compositions have been recorded and issued on CD, including:

- Music is Happiness Audio CD
