= Shakhida Shaimardanova =

Uzbek composer (1938–2020)

Shakhida Shaimardanova (11 November 1938 – 17 February 2020) was an Uzbek composer who is best known for her Symphony in C Major. Shaimardanova was born in Tashkent, where she studied music at the Tashkent Conservatory from 1957 to 1964. She uses themes from Uyghur folk music in her compositions. Her Symphony in C Major was recorded by the Uzbek State Philharmonic directed by Zakhid Khaknazarov on Molodiva D 076785/86.

Shaimardanova died on 17 February 2020, at the age of 81.

== Works ==
Shaimardanova’s compositions include:

=== Orchestra ===
- Sinfonietta
- Symphony in C Major
- Violin Concerto

=== Vocal ===
- Songs
