= Meri von KleinSmid =

American musician, artist and composer (born 1974)

Meri von KleinSmid (born 1974) is an American musician, artist and composer.

== Life ==
Meri von KleinSmid was born in Los Angeles, California, and studied choral music, piano, violin and flute as a child. She was educated at the University of Washington and Columbia College Chicago, where she studied music history and ethnomusicology. She lived for a while in Cambridge, England, but later moved to the Seattle/Vancouver area. She has been a member of the experimental musical collective SoniCabal and the Chinese Music Society of North America, among other organizations. The CD 60X60, including her work, won an award at the Just Plain Folks Music Awards in Nashville, Tennessee.

== Works ==
Selected works include:

- Monorail
- What Happens to the Deep-Sea Divers
- I Dreamt the PNE
- Are You Waiting for a Bus?
- Late-Night Café
- Waiting for the 99 B-Line
- Ethereal Tether
- The Observation of Curio No. 19

Her work has been issued on CD, including:

- CHI-TAPE [American Archive Recordings, AAR005] (U.S.A.)
- Women Take Back the Noise three disc compilation [Ubuibi] (U.S.A.)
- ELEKTRAMUSIC Electroacoustic Music Volume 01 [Elektramusic, ELEK01] (France)
- DISContact! III [CEC-PeP, PEP 007] (Canada)
- Ex Vivo [Mimeomeme-Mimeograph] (U.S.A.)
- 60x60, 2004-2005 2-disc compilation [Vox Novus] (U.S.A.)
