= Rose Thisse-Derouette =

Belgian composer, conductor, and teacher (1902–1989)

Rose Thisse-Derouette (20 July 1902 – 16 September 1989) was a Belgian composer, conductor, musicologist, folklorist and teacher. She was born in Liège, Belgium, and won the Prix de Rome for composition.

Thisse-Derouette wrote articles on folkloric dance in the 1960s, including "Our older players in Ardennes – Retrospective of a profession which has disappeared: li mestre", published in Watcher in the Walloon, No. 3, "Le recueil de danses manuscrit d’un ménétrier ardennais", published in Annales de l'institut archéologique du Luxembourg (éd. Fasbender, Arlon), and "Nos vieux joueurs de dans ardennais". She died in Liège in 1989.

== Works ==
Thisse-Derouette composed for vocal performance and opera. Selected works include:

- Danses Populaires de Wallonie with Jenny Falize Thisse-Derouette
- Le recueil de danses
- Poqwè HAD 'nin v'ni for solo voice and piano
