= Claire Renard =

French composer and multimedia artist

- Born: Claire Renard; December 10, 1944 (age 80)

Claire Renard (born 10 December 1944) is a French composer and multimedia artist.

== Biography ==
Born in Neuilly-sur-Seine, France, Claire Renard studied piano and law in Paris and graduated from the Conservatoire national supérieur de musique et de danse de Paris in 1973. After completing her studies, she worked as a piano teacher and as a composer of classical and electroacoustic works for sound installations.

She has been composer-in-residence at the Theatre of Saint-Quentin-en-Yvelines (1994–1996), Ville d'Epinal (1998), the National Conservatory of Grenoble (1999), the Theatre Athénor/St. Nazaire (2000), Villa Italy Gamberaia (2001–2002), European meeting Objective1 = Art = Objective1 Austria (2001), Park and Grande Halle de la Villette, Grame/Centre National de Création Musicale/Lyon (2005) and the Sally and Don Lucas Artists Programs Montalvo Art Center, California, USA (2006).

== Honours and awards ==
- Villa Medicis Hors les Murs prize, 1990
- Beaumarchais Foundation Prize for audiovisual works, 1990
- Beaumarchais Foundation Prize for operatic works, 2002
- Fellowship from DICREAM, 2002

== Works ==
Renard composes electro-acoustic works for music performances and sound installations. Her works have been installed and performed in France, Switzerland, Belgium, Italy, Austria, Finland and Greece. Selected works include:

- The Winds Of Time
- The Folds of the Sky
- I Need
- Take Me
- It Never Ceases to Die of this Said
- Summer Shorts
- A Roar of his Laughter
- Octave
- Air Dance
- Valley Closed
- Sand & Uncertainty
