= Onestina Ricotti =

Onestina Ricotti (19th century; published 1858) was an Italian author, composer, and music educator who was the director of the National Music Institute of Turin, Italy.

Little is known about Ricotti’s education or personal life. She wrote at least one book and one play. Her piano and vocal compositions number through at least opus 20, and were published by A. Romei and Giudici e Strada. Her publications included:

== Books ==
- La Musica e i Suoi Cultori (Music and Its Devotees)

== Piano ==
- Douce Esperance
- La Fiancee au Cheveux d’Or
- Le Reve d’un Ange
- Le Sponde del Po

== Plays ==
- Fra le Tombe: Commedia in Tre Atti (From the Tomb: Comedy in Three Acts) (1858)

== Vocal ==
- “Amina” (voice, piano, violin or flute)
- “Ida, opus 20” (soprano or mezzo-soprano)
- “Il Linguaggio del Cor”
- Les Petits Tambours (chorus)
- “Lo t’Amo”
- “Ti Vidi”
