= Zarrina Mirshakar =

Tajik composer (born 1947)

Zarrina Mirshakar (born 19 March 1947) is a Tajik composer. She was born in Dushanbe, Tajikistan, into the family of the national poet Mirsaid Mirshakar. She studied at Dushanbe Music College under Yuri Ter-Osipov from 1963–67 and at the Moscow Conservatory with Sergey Balasanian from 1967–74.

After completing her studies, Mirshakar took a position in 1974 at the Mirzo Tursun-zade Institute of Art in Tajikistan, and in 1994 became a senior lecturer in orchestration and composition.

== Works ==
Selected works include:

- 2 pamirskiye kartinï (2 Pamir Pictures) for orchestra, 1973–4
- Sinfonietta for strings, 1973–5
- Kraski solnechnogo Pamira (The Colours of the Sunny Pamir), symphonic poem, 1982
- Symphony no.1 for strings, 1991–3
- Cantata (M. Mirshakar) for children's chorus, chamber orch, 1975
- String Quartet, 1973
- 3 pamirskiye freski (3 Pamir Frescoes) for violin, pianoforte, 1976–7
- Sonata-poėma for clarinet, 1981
- 24 muzïkal'nïkh bayta (24 Musical Bytes) for pianoforte, 1982
- Sonata for oboe, 1987
- Crescendo for violin, pianoforte, 1988
- Respiro for violin, chamber orchestra, timpany, 1990
- Romance for three flutes, 1992
- 3 p'yesï (3 Pieces) for three violins, 1995
- 6 p'yes (6 Pieces) for flute, clarinet, 1995
- Nash Boki (Our Boki), film score (dir. V. Akhadov), 1972
- BAM, film score (The Baykal-Amur Railway), 1988
