= Wilhelmine von Troschke und Rosenwehrt =

German composer

Wilhelmine Auguste Charlotte Helene Apollonia von Troschke und Rosenwerth (1775-1830) was born in Lower Silesia and is considered to be a German composer. She published piano music under the name Wilhelmine von Troschke und Rosenwerth.

Wilhelmine married Ernst Christoph Gunther von Bronsart and they had two children: Rosaline Louise Adele Antoinette von Bronsart in 1807, and Karl August Johann Georg Ludwig Adolf von Bronsart in 1808. She later married Karl Ludwig Hasenwinkel.

Wilhelmine's music was published in Glogow (today in Poland). Her works include:

- 4 Themes with Variations for Piano or Harpsichord (1801):
  - Theme and 6 Variations
  - 7 Variations on 'Eine Hand voll Erde'
  - 6 Variations on 'Tiroler sind lustig' for Piano
  - 8 Variations on 'Die Milch ist gesünder' for Harp or Piano
- Variations on 'Ein Männchen oder Weibchen' for Piano (1801)

Download free sheet music by Wilhelmine von Troschke und Rosenwerth
