= Josephine Crew Aylwin =

American composer (1878-?)

Josephine Crew Aylwin (July 28, 1878 – after 1929) was an American composer and organist active during the 20th century.

== Life and career ==
Josephine Crew was born in Lawrence, Kansas, in 1878. She lived and worked in the San Francisco Bay Area during the early 1900s, where she was a noted composer. In 1899, Crew married Robert Aylwin in Oakland, California.

In 1912, The San Francisco Call published an article about the upcoming premiere of her cantata, Pied Piper of Hamelin, describing the piece as "among the notable works of the year". She was a member of the National League of American Pen Women, and was awarded their composition prize in 1929 for her work entitled Adagio. Aylwin was also the president of the Etude Club in 1911.

Aylwin composed primarily vocal works, including two cantatas, at least one opera, and songs for voice and piano, although she also wrote chamber music, such as her piano trio.

== Selected works ==
=== Songs ===
- "Break, Break, Break" (pub. 1907), text by Lord Alfred Tennyson
- "The Dance of the Seasons" (pub. 1907), text by Edith M. Thomas

=== Opera ===
- The Strike, comic opera (premiered in San Francisco, 1919)

=== Choral works ===
- The Pied Piper of Hamelin, cantata (pub. 1912)

=== Chamber music ===
- Piano Trio
