= Harriet Maitland Young =

British musician, composer and songwriter

Harriet Maitland Young (1838 – 1923) was a British composer, songwriter, operettas, and instrumentalist. Her operetta An Artist's Proof was performed in Brighton, England, on 4 February 1882. Her operetta The Queen of Hearts was performed in Dartford, England, in 1888. She was buried in Camden, London, England.

Young's compositions include:

== Operetta ==
- An Artist's Proof (1882)
- (The) Holy Branch (also seen as The Holly Branch)
- Queen of Hearts (1888)
- When One Door Shuts

== Vocal ==
- Ah! Si Vous Saviez
- Bella Pescatorina
- Golden Days and Silvery Nights
- In Sunny Spain (women's choir and piano)
- La Mia Bella
- Lullaby (voice and cello)
- Out of Reach
- Secret is My Own
- Where the Roses Are (duet)
