= Josefa Somellera =

Argentine composer and singer

Josefa Somellera Guiterrez Zavalla Rebollo (1810-1885) was an Argentine composer and singer who performed and published under the name Josefa Somellera.

Somellera was born in Buenos Aires to Josefa Gutierrez Dominguez de Somellera y del Cerro and Andres Somellera del Cerro. She had 17 siblings. Her aunt was Candeleria Somellera de Espinosa, a composer, pianist, and socialite whose portrait was painted by Jacobo Lorenzo Fiorini. Josefa Somellera married Juan Angel Zavalla Rebollo and they had three children.

Somellera studied at the Escuela de Musica y Canto with Jose Antonio Picazarri and his nephew Juan Pedro Esnaola. Her singing was praised by operatic soprano Adelina Patti. She apparently composed some works based on Argentine folklore, but is best known for her song “The Death of Corina,” dedicated to D. Corina Blanco and based on text by Juan Cruz Varela. She died in Montevideo in 1885.
