= Franz Gehring =

German writer

Franz Gehring (December 7, 1838 – January 4, 1884) was a German writer on music.

Gehring was a lecturer on mathematics, at first in Bonn, then from 1871 at Vienna University, but became known for his writings on music, particularly his biographies. Among the most notable are his biography of Mozart published in Francis Hueffer's The Great Musicians series of books, and several articles contributed to the Grove Dictionary of Music and Musicians.
