= Anne Upton =

American composer and radio writer

Florine Anne Upton Baldwin (28 June 1892 – 8 September 1970) was an American composer and radio writer, who published her works under the name Anne Upton.

Upton was born in Marble Falls, Newton, Arkansas, to Canzadia Ramsey and Albert Franklin Upton. Her son Rex Allen Head was born in Texas in 1916. She married Donald A. Baldwin around 1926. She lived in Los Angeles from at least 1930 until her death in 1970. Little is known about her musical education. She studied writing at the Frederick Palmer Institute of Authorship in Hollywood, California.

Upton belonged to the American Society of Composers, Authors, and Publishers (ASCAP), and worked as a radio writer and producer. During the early 1940s, she wrote the words for several choral works by composer William T. Wilkins, doing business as "Wilton House, Los Angeles." Her compositions include:

== Opera ==
- Book of Ruth

== Orchestra ==
- Cattle at Eventide (symphonic poem)

== Theatre ==
- Anne's Minstrels: an Old Time Show in Two Parts

== Vocal ==
- Children, Emancipate (oratorio)
- Doves of Heavenly Peace (mixed voices; music by William T. Wilkins, text by Anne Upton)
- Father Lead Me (mixed voices; music by William T. Wilkins, text by Anne Upton)
- Gabriel a Singin' (mixed voices; music by William T. Wilkins, text by Anne Upton)
- I Wanna be Good Lak Jesus Lawd (mixed voices; music by William T. Wilkins, text by Anne Upton)
- Life of Jesus (cantata)
- Morninglight (mixed voices; music by William T. Wilkins, text by Anne Upton)
- Pistol - Totin' Pappy (voice and piano)
- Remember the Four (JFK memorial)
- The Stars Wrote a Song About You (voice and piano)
- Toilin' by de Light oh Mah Lord (mixed voices; music by William T. Wilkins, text by Anne Upton)
