= Alice Sirooni =

American composer and pianist

Anahid Alice Sirooni (March 11, 1921 - February 28, 2011) was an American composer and pianist who toured and recorded commercially.

Sirooni was born in New York to Aroose Vartanian and Ardshir Sirooni. She earned a diploma in piano from the Juilliard School in 1939 and a postgraduate diploma in 1942.

Sirooni made her debut as a pianist in a recital at Town Hall in New York City on February 27, 1945. An unattributed review in The New York Times noted that “Miss Sirooni’s audience greeted her playing with enthusiasm.” On March 11, 1951, Sirooni presented the New York premiere of John Haussermann’s Symphonic Preludes at Town Hall, which was also reported in The New York Times.

Sirooni toured throughout the Eastern United States and appeared on TV and radio with soprano Ruth Bishop and tenor Bruce Amory as the Amory Bishop Sirooni Trio. She also presented recitals with violinist Herbert Baumel.

In 1952, Sirooni requested an audition with Rudolf Serkin, presumably because of his connection with the Curtis Institute and the Marlboro Music School and Festival. His response was unknown.

Sirooni recorded LPs for Concert Classics, a division of RME whose recording were distributed by Renaissance Records. Her LPs included:

- Keyboard Favorites #A4149
- Romantic Contemporary Composers #7149
- Trilogia En La Muerte De John F. Kennedy #4150

Sirooni contributed exercises on “Finger Independence” and “Repeated Notes” to the collection Technical Control for the Modern Pianist by Albert De Vito. Her works for piano were published by Kenyon Publications, and included:

- Poeme
- Prelude in E minor
- Rondo in E Flat
