= Sofia Levkovskaya =

Russian composer

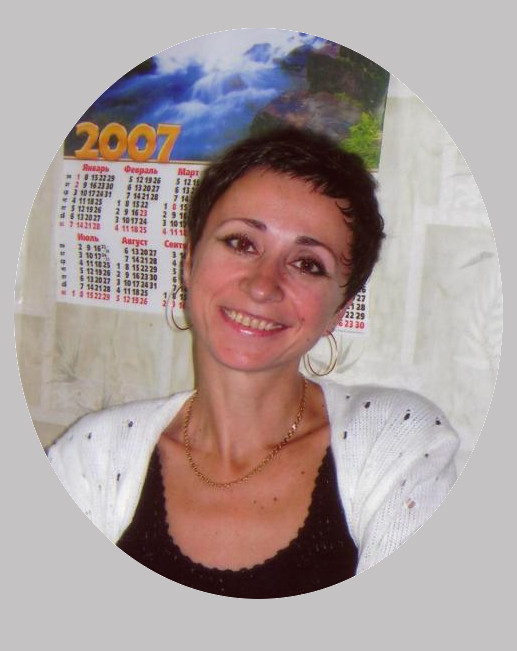
- Born: 25 November 1965; Leningrad
- Died: 20 June 2011 (aged 45); Saint Petersburg
- Occupation: Composer

Sofia Sergeevna Levkovskaya (Russian: София Сергеевна Левковская, 25 November 1965 – 20 June 2011) was a Russian composer. She has worked with several conductors, including Alexander Titov, Fedor Lednev, Anatoly Rybalko, and Alim Shakhmametyev; violinists Matvey Lapin and Ilya Ioff, the singer Nadezhda Khadzheva, the flutist Georgy Dolgov, the clarinetist Ilya Gindin, the saxophonist Serafima Verholat, a violinist and composer Artur Zobnin and the pianist Nikolai Mazhara.

Levkovskaya has used musical citations in her compositions. Musical critic Alexander Kharkovsky noted the highly theatrical form in her music, the use of catchy slogans as titles of her works, as well as the detailed thoughtfulness of the ideas.

== Bibliography ==
- Khazdan, E. V. "Instrumental Theater of Sofia Levkovskaya", Opera Musicologica. 2012. No 4 (14). pp. 97–114.
- Sofia Levkovskaya, KinoPoisk
- Levkovskaya, S. S. "Instrumental Theater: visual and sound dictate of the scene", Musicus. 2008. No. 1 (10).
- Levkovskaya, S. S. "Words. Sounds. Movements", Musicus. 2010. Nos. 1–2 (20–21).
- Levkovskaya, S. S.; Kharkovsky A.Z. "Free Electron of Anatoly Korolev", Musicus. 2009. No. 3 (16).
- Levkovskaya, S. S.; Vladimir Martynov "Casus Vita Nova", Opera Musicologica. 2010. No. 2 [4].
