= Emma Wooge =

German composer and singer (1857–1935)

Emma Wooge (2 April 1857 – 13 April 1935) was a German composer and singer born in Hamburg. She studied with Eduard Behm and Richard J. Eichberg. Between 1880 and 1882, Wooge was a mezzo-soprano at the Hamburg State Opera. She sang in the chorus for the 1882 performance of the Brahms Requiem in Hamburg, where she met Johannes Brahms. In 1883 she moved to Darmstadt to sing for two years at the Hoftheater, then moved to work at the Leipzig municipal theatre from 18 August 1885 to 1 July 1886. After leaving Leipzig, she worked as a singing teacher in Berlin until her death.

Her compositions include:

== Piano ==
- Lyric Wise Men, opus 11
- Three Pieces, opus 6

== Vocal ==
- Four Songs, opus 1
- Four Songs, opus 2
- Leave the Child (2 voices and piano or organ)
- (The) Most Beautiful Sight, opus 18 (multi text setting)
- opus 5 (songs)
- Three Baptisms, opus 10
- Three Duets
- Three Songs, opus 7
- Three Travel Thoughts
- Two Christmas Carols, opus 12 (1 or 2 voices)
