= Caroline Sawath =

German composer

Caroline Sawath (mid 19th century) was a German composer of piano pieces. She performed in at least one concert in 1848 and taught at the Mitternast Piano School in Vienna from 1855 to 1863. Her compositions were published by H. F. Muller Witwe and by C. A. Spina.

Hofmeister (probably German music bibliographer Friedrich Hofmeister) listed 16 works composed by Sawath between 1853 and 1860. Her compositions for piano include:

- Kleine Tonstucke, opus 9
- Mailied, opus 16
- Schafers Morgenlied Romanze, opus 3
- Download Schafers Morgenlied Romanze opus 3 for piano by Caroline Sawath
