= Louise Filliaux-Tiger =

French pianist and composer (1848–1916)

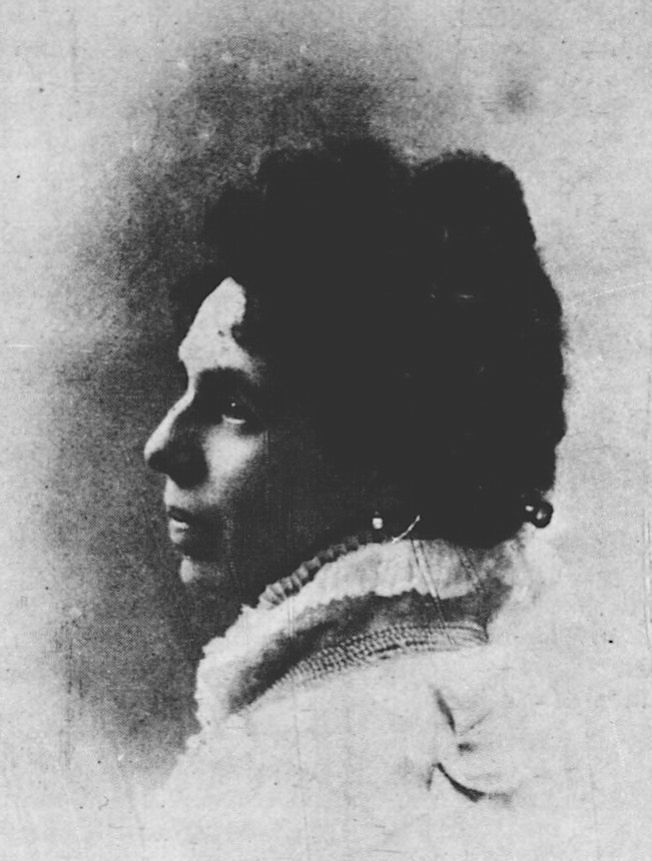
- Filliaux-Tiger in c. 1897
- Born: Louise Sophie Tiger; 22 May 1848; Paris, France
- Died: 28 November 1916 (aged 68); Nice, France
- Occupations: Pianist; composer

Louise Filliaux-Tiger (22 May 1848 – 28 November 1916) was a French pianist, composer and teacher of the late Romantic period. Born into an artistic family, Filliaux-Tiger attended the Conservatoire de Paris, spending her subsequent career in the city. As a successful performer and composer for piano, most of her works were for the instrument, although she wrote vocal and chamber music as well.

== Life and career ==
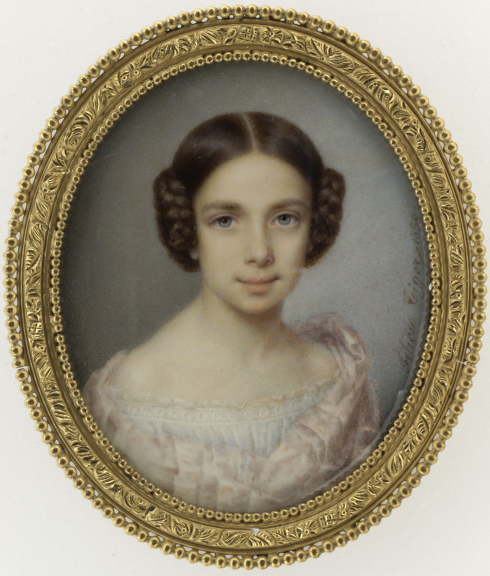
Presumed portrait of young Louise Tiger, by her mother Félicie Tiger in 1859.

Louise Sophie Tiger was born on 22 May 1848 in the 8th arrondissement of Paris, France. Her father was the architect Alexandre-Joseph-Jean-Baptiste Tiger, while her mother was the painter Félicie Tiger. She entered the Conservatoire de Paris sometime before 1868. Tiger's Conservatoire awards included 2nd runner-up (accessit) for harmony and accompaniment in 1868 and 2nd prize in the same category for 1869. At some point she married Charles-Émile Filliaux, and combined their surnames.

Filliaux-Tiger became an Officier d'Académie on 24 December 1885. A member of both the Société nationale de musique and the International Society of Music, she was vice president of the Union of Women Music Teachers and Composers for a time. She founded the Soirées confraternelles in 1897, annual concerts at the Salle Pleyel which featured the work of women composers. She died suddenly on 28 November 1916 in Nice, France. Her will included a bequest of 120,000 F to the French government, granted that it be used for performances of orchestral music by French woman composers.

She was active as a pianist, composer and teacher. Teaching from Paris, the Dictionnaire national des contemporains describes her as a "renowned" pianist. The latter source insists she was best known as a composer; her compositions include mainly piano works, but also songs and chamber music. Many of her works were distributed by the Société Coopérative des Compositeurs de Musique, but often published "at her own expense". Among her best known works is a Ballade (1914), simultaneously published in both vocal and solo piano variants; a third version, with two additional voices, was published in 1915. The vocal ensemble Para l'Elles noted the work's detailed instructions, and likened the atmospheric choral writing to that of Debussy and Ravel.

After a period of neglect, Filliaux-Tiger was rediscovered by the research of composer Adélaïde Legras, in the Bibliothèque nationale de France archives, where many of her works are held.

== List of compositions ==
Piano

- Deux Pièces Pastorales pour piano, 1890
- Dans les brandes, 1900
