= Winifred Emily Rees =

British author

Winifred Emily Rees (née Davis) (16 May 1900 - 23 May 1976) was a British author, composer, organist and teacher who later moved to Canada. Her students included Paul Anka.

Rees was born in London, where she studied with Edwin Crusha, Mabel Floyd, Frank Griggs, and Greta Harrison. She attended the Guildhall School of Music and Drama for six years, and the University of London for one year, where she earned both an Associate (ARCM) and Licentiate (LRAM) certifications from the Royal College of Music (London), and a Licentiate (LGSM) from the Guildhall School of Music and Drama.

Rees moved to Ottawa, Canada, where she taught piano and served as a church organist for ten years.

== Works ==
Rees’ works were published by the Bridge Music Company and Lorenz Publishing Company (today the Lorenz Corporation), and include:

=== Book ===
- Book of Theory

=== Organ ===
- A Toye
- Cavatina
- Progress 28 March

=== Vocal ===
- “Blessed Jesus Answers Prayer”
- “God is the Answer”
- “Lullaby” (text by William Blake)
- “Thee We Praise”
- “Winds Through the Olive Trees”
