= Sophia Dellaporta =

Greek composer

Sophia Dellaporta (fl. after 1850) was a Greek composer. She published a musical titled Recueil in Leipzig in 1877, including eight songs. The collection won a prize at the Third Greek Composers' Competition conducted in Athens at the 1875 Olympic Exhibition.
