= Jill Burton =

American improviser and performance artist

- Born: 1952 (age 73–74)
- Occupations: Improviser, extended vocalist, dancer, performance artist, energy worker
- Years active: 1970s–present
- Known for: Foundation improviser; Incorporating spiritual healing with improvised performance
- Style: Improvisation; Extended vocal technique; Performance art
- Movement: Experimental arts

Jill Burton (born 1952) is an American improviser, extended vocalist, dancer, performance artist and energy worker. Noted as one of the great foundation improvisors of America, she is also known for incorporating spiritual healing with improvised performance. Active in the American improv scene since the early 1970s, she has lived and worked all over the country, including a ten-year stint in the 1980s as part of the downtown East Village experimental arts community, and six years in Sitka, Alaska, where she worked with Tlingit storytellers providing musical accompaniment for their healing stories. Burton is unusual for a musician in that her work is ephemeral, in-the-moment, and therefore recordings of her work are rare. She has collaborated with many notable experimental musicians and dancers, including LaDonna Smith, Davey Williams, Jane Scarpantoni, Judy Dunaway, David First, Rain Worthington, Gino Robair, Jack Wright, and Scott Walton.
