= Anne LeBaron =

American composer (born 1953)

Dr. Anne LeBaron
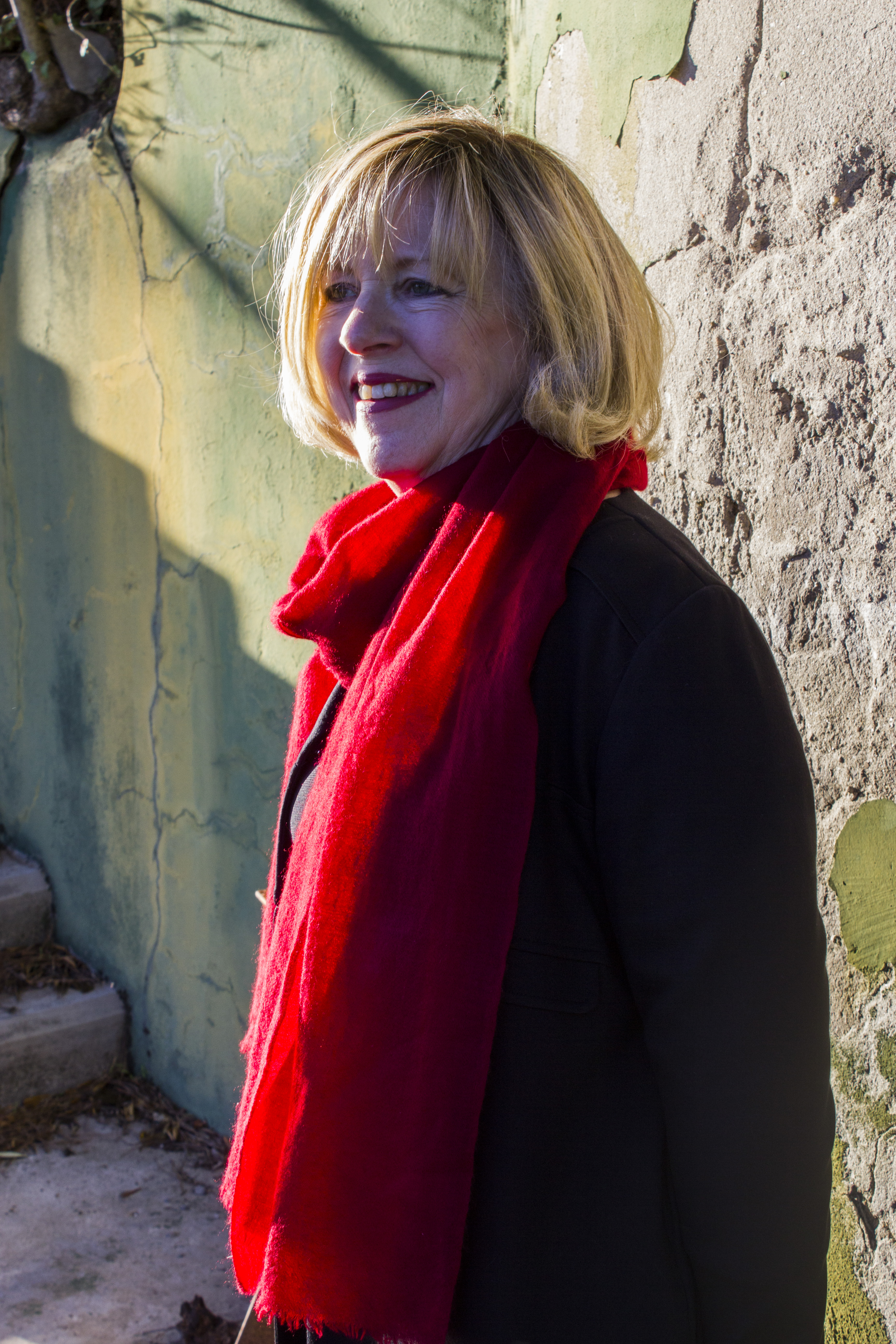
- LeBaron in 2018. Photo by Adel Oberto.
- Born: Alice Anne LeBaron; May 30, 1953 (age 73); Baton Rouge, Louisiana
- Education: University of Alabama (BA, music); Stony Brook University (MA, music); Columbia University (Doctorate, music)
- Occupations: Composer; harpist; academic; writer
- Notable work: LSD: Huxley’s Last Trip; Crescent City; Sucktion
- Awards: Guggenheim Fellowship; Fulbright scholarship; Joseph H. Bearns Prize; Alpert Award in the Arts; Toulmin Grant from Opera America
- Website: www.annelebaron.com

Alice Anne LeBaron (born May 30, 1953) is an American composer, harpist, academic, and writer.

LeBaron’s compositions combine formal complexity and structural rigor with an experimental outlook, encompassing tonal and atonal methods and selectively on diverse musical traditions. Her work explores environmental, cultural, and philosophical subjects, frequently integrating theater and literature while employing distinctive approaches to timbre, notation, and instrumental technique. As an improvising harpist, LeBaron is known for her use and development of extended techniques such as preparing and bowing the harp, electronic enhancements, and unconventional notation for the instrument.

Among other venues, LeBaron's work has been performed at Carnegie Hall, the Hollywood Bowl, and the Kennedy Center, by orchestras including the Los Angeles Philharmonic and the National Symphony Orchestra. She is the recipient of an Alpert Award in the Arts, a Toulmin grant from Opera America, a Guggenheim fellowship, and a Fulbright Full Scholarship. She has been commissioned by the Fromm Music Foundation, the National Endowment for the Arts and the Library of Congress, among other organizations. She served as chair of the Board of the American Composers Forum from 2018 to 2020.

LeBaron taught composition and interdisciplinary courses at the California Institute of the Arts for more than two decades and was appointed professor emerita upon her retirement in 2024.

== Early life and education ==
LeBaron was born in Baton Rouge and raised in Memphis and Tuscaloosa. Her father, Gordon, was an advertising executive and bluegrass musician; in addition to singing, he played guitar, banjo, dobro and mandolin. She grew up listening to her father sing and play his instruments each evening after he returned home from work, as well as gospel and choral music at the Baptist church she attended with her family.

As a child, LeBaron taught herself to play piano and read music. In her teens she took lessons with a Juilliard-trained pianist and wrote songs on an acoustic guitar, setting her poetry to music. Her grandmother taught her to play chess, and at the age of twelve LeBaron won a University of Alabama chess competition. She later said that chess taught her stamina and concentration, "but above all that you can always find a better move if you look long enough."

LeBaron attended the University of Alabama, intending to study piano. She shifted her emphasis to composition, with a parallel interest in the harp after coming across the instrument in an empty music room. As an undergraduate, she studied classical harp technique with teachers including Alice Chalifoux at the Salzedo Harp Colony. She was a member of the Raudelunas 'Pataphysical Revue, a surrealist art collective, along with Reverend Fred Lane, Davey Williams and LaDonna Smith.

LeBaron received a BA in music at the University of Alabama, where she studied with Frederic Goossen, and a master's degree at Stony Brook University, where her teachers included Bülent Arel and Daria Semegen. As a Fulbright Scholar to Germany, she studied with Mauricio Kagel and György Ligeti, and in 1989 she was awarded a Doctorate in Musical Arts from Columbia University, where she was a student of Chou Wen-chung, Jack Beeson, and Mario Davidovsky. Her doctoral thesis, a significant composition and accompanying analysis sharing the title Telluris Theoria Sacra, was inspired by the 17th-century theologian Thomas Burnet and by James Gleick's book on chaos theory. She also studied Korean traditional music at the National Classical Music Institute in Seoul.

== Career ==
LeBaron served as composer-in-residence in Washington, DC, sponsored by Meet the Composer from 1993 until 1996, and was an assistant professor of music at the University of Pittsburgh from 1996 to 2001. She was appointed Professor of Music at the California Institute of the Arts in 2001, held the Roy E. Disney Family Chair in Musical Composition from 2013 until 2016, and developed innovative cross-disciplinary courses such as Concert Theater, Contemplative Practices and Musical Arts, Hyperopera, and Musical Reflections of Surrealism.

=== Composition ===
LeBaron's compositions in instrumental, electronic, and performance realms embrace a wide range of media and styles. Frequently combining tonal and atonal techniques, she has utilized elements of blues, jazz, pop, rock, and folk music in such scores as the opera The E. and O. Line (1993), American Icons (1996) for orchestra, and Traces of Mississippi (2000) for chorus, orchestra, poet narrators, and rap artists. She has also used American literary sources with Devil in the Belfry (1993) for violin and piano, inspired by Edgar Allan Poe, and Is Money Money (2000), a setting of Gertrude Stein texts for soprano and chamber ensemble.

Among her multicultural compositions are Lamentation/Invocation (1984) for baritone and three instruments, using Korean-derived gestures and long sustained tones for the voice; Noh Reflections (1985) for string trio, which draws upon the music of Japanese Noh theater; Breathtails (2012) for baritone, string quartet, and Japanese shakuhachi; and her large-scale celebration of Kazakhstan, The Silent Steppe Cantata (2011) for tenor Timur Bekbosunov, women's chorus, and an orchestra of traditional Kazakh instruments, premiered at Congress Hall in Astana.

Writing about LeBaron's 1989 Telluris Theoria Sacra (for flute/piccolo, clarinet/bass clarinet, violin, viola, cello, percussion, and piano), musicologist Susan McClary notes that the work "...points to LeBaron's more pervasive interest in music's ability to mold temporality, immersing the listener in a sound world in which time bends, stands still, dances, or conforms to the mechanical measure of the clock".

Theater has played an important role in LeBaron's music, with such scores as Concerto for Active Frogs (1974) for voices, three instruments, and tape, and the harp solos I Am an American ... My Government Will Reward You (1988) and Hsing (2002). She has also composed a series of monodramas for female voice and chamber musicians: Pope Joan (2000), Transfiguration (2003), Sucktion (2008), and Some Things Should Not Move (2013). LeBaron's operas The E. and O. Line (and the shorter version, Blue Calls Set You Free), Croak (The Last Frog) (1996), and Wet (2005) were all collaborative works that led her to develop the genre she terms "hyperopera": "an opera resulting from intensive collaboration across all the disciplines essential for producing opera in the 21st century – in a word, a 'meta-collaborative' undertaking".

With her hyperopera Crescent City (2012, libretto by Douglas Kearney), LeBaron went a step beyond the nineteenth-century concept of the Gesamtkunstwerk (the united/total/universal artwork that synthesized architecture, scenic painting, singing, instrumental music, poetry, drama, and dance), championed by Richard Wagner. A more lateral, inclusive, and intensive collaboration of artists occurs with hyperopera, breaking down the usual hierarchical structures of traditional opera, which define and limit the roles of individuals on creative and production teams. The genre of hyperopera involves the collaborations of a diverse group of artists, which pierce the regimented boundaries of the roles of creators, performers, designers, and producers. In the postmodern tradition of redefining opera, also seen in the work of Robert Ashley, Meredith Monk, and Robert Wilson, LeBaron replaced the Wagnerian orchestra with smaller and more specialized forces of instruments and electronic sound for Crescent City, with musicians who move readily among stylistic genres, just as the vocalists do. The opera's theatrical action is refracted through a prism of video work, lighting effects, and performance freedoms and simultaneities. For its world premiere production in Los Angeles in 2012, Crescent City also engaged six visual artists to participate in the collaborative process by designing and building set pieces as various locales in the opera. Directed by Yuval Sharon, Crescent City was the inaugural production of the experimental opera company, The Industry. Prior to the full production of Crescent City, LeBaron composed Phantasmagoriettas from Crescent City, performed by the LOOS Electro Acoustic Media Orchestra and soloists from Los Angeles during the Dag in de Branding Festival in the Hague in 2007.

LSD: Huxley’s Last Trip features microtonal instruments built by Harry Partch. Several staged concert performances have taken place in Los Angeles, beginning in 2015.

Anne LeBaron’s compositions are published by the U.K.-based Composers Edition.

=== Improvisation ===
As an improviser LeBaron employs a wide array of extended techniques for the harp, including preparing the harp (similar to John Cage's prepared piano) and bowing the strings, as well as a variety of electronic enhancements. Her development of a new performance vocabulary for the instrument began in the early 1970s, when she played in the Alabama improvising ensemble Trans Museq along with Davey Williams and LaDonna Smith. Her career as an improviser has included performance collaborations with such creative composer/musicians as Anthony Braxton, Muhal Richard Abrams, Evan Parker, George E. Lewis, Derek Bailey, Leroy Jenkins, Lionel Hampton, Fred Frith, Evan Parker, Anthony Davis, Wadada Leo Smith, Gerry Hemingway, and Shelley Hirsch. LeBaron's double-CD 1, 2, 4, 3 (Innova 236, 2010) features collaborations with thirteen different musicians in solo, duo, quartet and trio configurations.

LeBaron performs in Los Angeles and elsewhere as a member of the Present Quartet, with Ellen Burr, flutes; Charles Sharp, clarinet and saxophone; and Jeff Schwarz, bass.

== Selected awards, grants, and fellowships ==
Year	Award	Sponsor	Ref.
1981-1982	Fulbright Full Scholarship	U.S. Department of State's Bureau of Educational and Cultural Affairs through an annual appropriation by the U.S. Congress.	
1981	NEA Fellowship	National Endowment for the Arts	
1991	John Simon Guggenheim Memorial Foundation Fellowship	Guggenheim Memorial Foundation	
1996	Alpert Award in the Arts	Herb Alpert Foundation	
1997	Fromm Foundation Commission	Harvard University	
2000, 2005	Bellagio Composer Residency	Rockefeller Foundation	
2007, 2011	MAP Fund Award (Multi-Arts Production Fund)	Rockefeller Foundation	
2008	ArtsLink Award for The Silent Steppe Cantata	ArtsLink, grant to support the creation of Silent Steppe Cantata in Kazakhstan	
2009	LA Dept. of Cultural Affairs Cultural Exchange International Grant	Los Angeles Department of Culture Affairs; funding of SIlent Steppe Cantata in Kazakhstan	
2014	Opera America Toulmin Foundation Discovery Grant	Opera America	
2017	USArtists International Grant	Grant to support appearance as featured international artist, Totally Huge New Music Festival, Perth, Australia	
2018	Bogliasco Study Center for the Humanities and the Arts fellowship	Bogliasco Foundation	
2023	Davise Fund Commission	UCLA Library	
2026	Creator Fund Award for All Waste Accepted	New Music USA	

== Major productions ==
Year	Title	Venue	Notes	Ref.
1993	The E. and O. Line	University of the District of Columbia	Librettist: Thulani Davis	
1995-2024	Blue Calls Set You Free	Carter Barron Amphitheater; Wooly Mammoth Theater Company, Washington DC; Tula Concert Hall, Tula, Russia	Librettist: Thulani Davis	
2000	Pope Joan	Dance Alloy and the Pittsburgh New Music Ensemble	Poet: Enid Shomer	
2005	Wet	REDCAT, Los Angeles	Librettist: Terese Svoboda	
2008	Sucktion	REDCAT, Los Angeles; Malmö, Sweden; York, England; Theater am Wien, Vienna; Open Gate Theater, Pasadena, CA	Librettist: Douglas Kearney	
2012	Crescent City	The Industry, Los Angeles	Librettist: Douglas Kearney	
2015-2024	LSD: Huxley's Last Trip	Wallis Annenberg Center, the Schindler House, and REDCAT in Los Angeles	Scored for an ensemble including instruments built by Harry Partch Librettists: Gerd Stern, Ed Rosenfeld, Anne LeBaron	

== Major works ==
=== Chamber ===
- Concerto for Active Frogs (1974)
- Rite of the Black Sun (1980)
- I Am An American...My Government Will Reward You (1988)
- Is Money Money (2000)
- Transfiguration (2003)
- Los Murmullos (2006)
- Way of Light (2006)
- Breathtails (2012)
- Radiant Depth Unfolded -- Settings of Rumi (2015)
- The Heroine with a Thousand Faces (2024 -)

=== Orchestral ===
- Strange Attractors (1987)
- Double Concerto for Two Harps (One Player) (1995)
- Southern Ephemera for Orchestra (1984)
- American Icons (1996)
- Traces of Mississippi (2000)

=== Choral ===
- Light Breaks Where No Sun Shines (1977)
- Story of My Angel (1993)
- Silent Steppe Cantata (2011)
- Floodsongs (2012)

=== Opera ===
- The E. and O. Line (1993)
- Blue Calls Set You Free (1994)
- Pope Joan (2000)
- Wet (2005)
- Sucktion (2008)
- Crescent City (2012)
- LSD: Huxley's Last Trip (2024)

== Selected bibliography ==
- “What to Think About What to Wear,” Center for New Performance 20th Anniversary Publication, 2024. ISBN 979-888589065-6
- "Anne LeBaron - Surreal Confluences" in John Palmer - Conversations, 2nd Edition, published by Vision Edition, 2023. ISBN 978-1-7397815-6-9
- “Sonic Ventures in Post-Truth Surrealism: Raudelunas, the Rev. Fred Lane, and Huxley’s Last Trip”, Keynote address for the Totally Huge New Music Festival, 2017.
- “Luminous Imagination: Thereafter, Transparence, and Wonders,” and “Timbral and Spatial Ambiguities in the Mesmerizing Music of John Palmer" in Looking Within – The Music of John Palmer, ed. by Sunny Knable, published by Vision Edition, 2021. ISBN 9780993176173
- “Return to Source: Contemporary Composers Discuss the Sociopolitical Implications of Their Work,” Leonardo Music Journal, Vol. 25, 2015.
- "Composing Breathtails" in Current Musicology, 2014.
- Crescent City: A Hyperopera" in International Alliance for Women in Music Journal, 2013.
- "Down the Rabbit-Hole of Innovation" in UCLA Center for the Study of Women Special Issue: Writing About Music, 2010.
- "The American Composer's Place in the New Grove II", NewMusicBox, 2002.
- "Reflections of Surrealism in Postmodern Musics" in Postmodern Music/Postmodern Thought, Lochhead, Judy and Auner, Joseph, eds. Routledge, 2002.

== Selected discography ==
- Unearthly Delights (2020). Ashley Wiest, Stephanie Aston, sopranos; Andy Dwan, baritone; Chris Stoutenborough, Jim Sullivan, clarinets; Julie Feves, Jon Stehney, bassoons; Anne LeBaron, Alison Bjorkedal, harps; Nic Gerpe, Mark Robson, pianos; Cory Hills, percussion; Pasha Tseitlin, Mark Menzies, violins; Erik Rynearson, Linnea Powell, violas; Charlie Tyler, cello; Eric Shetzen, contrabass; Nicholas Olof Jacobson-Larson, Nick Deyoe, conductors. Innova Recordings 026.
- Routes, Paths, Courses (2019). Present Quartet (Ellen Burr, flutes; Anne LeBaron, harp and electronics; Jeff Schwartz, bass; Charles Sharp, clarinets, alto sax, piri, electronics). pfMENTUM PFMCD131.
- Crescent City (2014). Maria Elena Altany, Lillian Sengpiehl, Ji Young Yang, sopranos; Gwendolyn Brown, contralto; Timur Bekbosunov, Ashley Faatoalia, Jonathan Mack, tenors; Cedric Barry, bass-baritone; Marc Lowenstein, conductor. Innova Recordings 878.
- Floodsongs. Included on Floodsongs (2014). Solaris Vocal Ensemble; Giselle Wyers, conductor; Phil Curtis, electronic sound. Albany Records TROY1468.
- 1, 2, 4, 3 (2010). Anne LeBaron, harp, electronics, percussion; Kiku Day, shakuhachi; Wolfgang Fuchs, contrabass clarinet; Georg Graewe, piano; Kristin Haraldsdottir, viola; Chris Heenan, alto saxophone; Earl Howard, electronics; Leroy Jenkins, amplified violin; Ronit Kirchman, violin, mouth whistle; John Lindberg, bass; Torsten Müller, bass; Kanoko Nishi, koto; Paul Rutherford, trombone; Nathan Smith, clarinets. Innova Recordings 236.
- Pope Joan, Transfiguration (2007). Kristin Norderval, soprano; Mark Menzies, conductor; Lucy Shelton, soprano; Rand Steiger, conductor. New World Records 80663–2.
- Is Money Money. Included on To Have and to Hold (2007). Dora Ohrenstein, soprano; Sequitur; Paul Hostetter, conductor. Koch International Classics 7593.
- Los Murmullos. Included on Rumor de Páramo (2006). Ana Cervantes, piano. Quindecim Recordings 164.
- Concerto for Active Frogs. Included on Raudelunas 'Pataphysical Revue (2003). Adrian Dye, solo voice; Anne LeBaron, percussion and tape; Roger Hagerty, oboe and musette; Jack Reese, species; Frog Chorus (Janice Hathaway, Nolan Hatcher, Craig Nutt, LaDonna Smith, Theodore Bowen, Johnny Williams, Mitchell Cashion). Alcohol ALRP1CD
- Sacred Theory of the Earth. (2000) Atlanta Chamber Players, David Rosenboom, conductor; Paula Peace, piano; Christopher Pulgram, violin; Amy Porter, flute; Anne LeBaron, harp. New World/Composers Recordings NWCR 865.
- Southern Ephemera. Included on Dance of the Seven Veils (1996). New Band. Music & Arts 4931.
- The Musical Railism of Anne LeBaron (1995). New Music Consort, Theater Chamber Players of Kennedy Center; Anne LeBaron, Leon Fleisher, Claire Heldrich, conductors. Mode Records 42.
- Dish. Included on Urban Diva (1993). Dora Ohrenstein, soprano. New World Records|New World/Composers Recordings NWCR 654.
- Phantom Orchestra (1992). The Anne LeBaron Quintet (Frank London, trumpet; Marcus Rojas, tuba; Davey Williams, electric guitar; Gregg Bendian, drums, vibraphone, percussion; Anne LeBaron, harp with electronics): "Bouquet of a Phantom Orchestra," "Human Vapor," "Superstrings and Curved Space," "Bottom Wash," "Top Hat on a Locomotive," "Loaded Shark." Ear Rational ECD 1035.
- Rana, Ritual & Revelations (1992). New Music Consort, Linda Bouchard, Claire Heldrich, Anne LeBaron, conductors; Theater Chamber Players of Kennedy Center, Anne LeBaron, conductor. Mode Records 30.
