= Isabel Soveral =

Portuguese composer (born 1961)

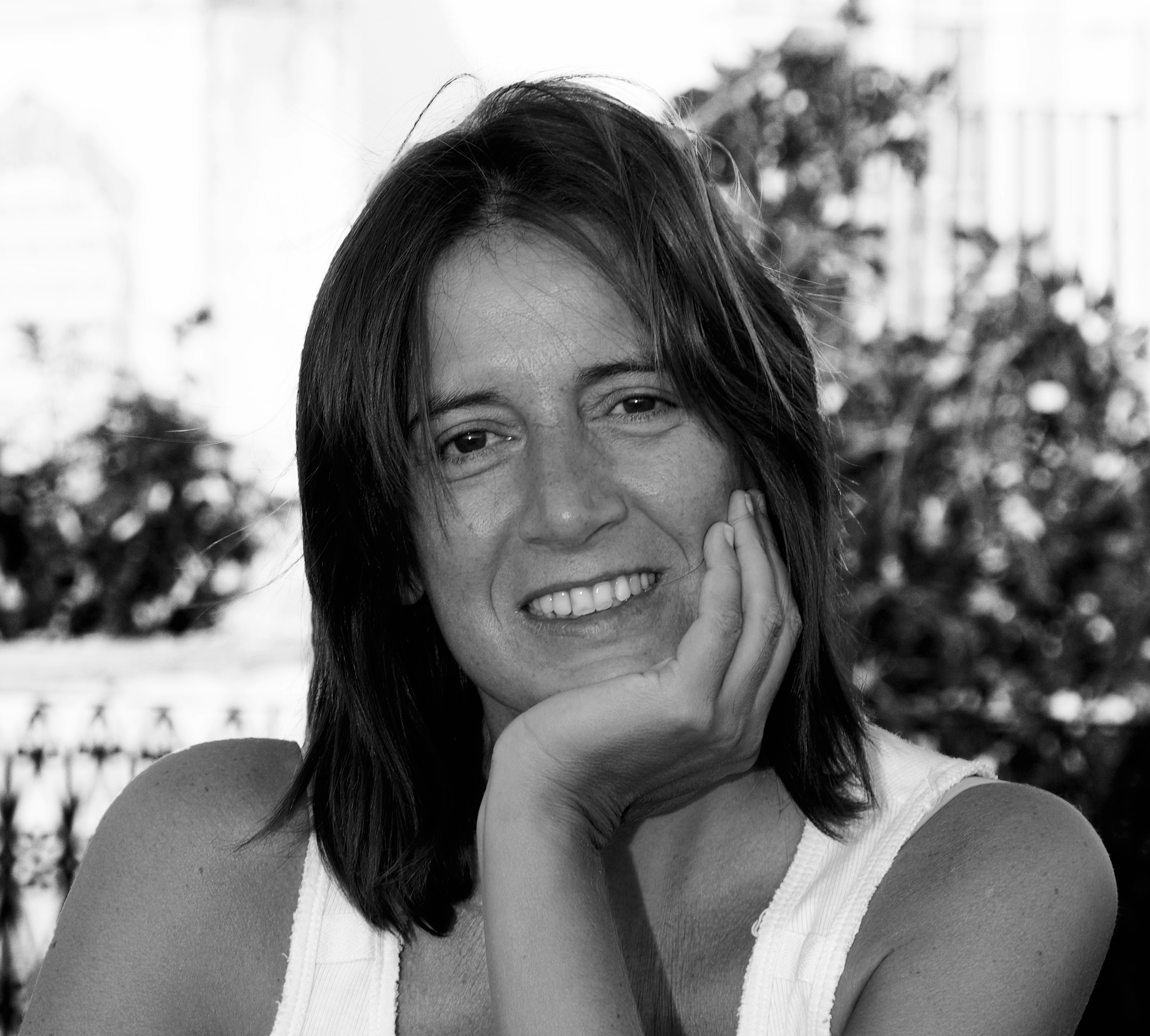
Isabel Soveral in 2018

Isabel Soveral (born 1961) is a Portuguese composer of contemporary music.

== Life ==
Isabel Soveral was born in 1961 in Porto, Portugal. She graduated from the Conservatório Nacional de Lisboa where she studied with the composers Jorge Peixinho and Joly Braga Santos. In 1988, she attended the State University of New York at Stony Brook, where she studied with Daria Semegen and Bulent Arel, having completed her master's (1991) and PhD (1994) in Composition at that university.

She was a Fellow of Calouste Gulbenkian Foundation, Luso-American Foundation and Fulbright Program.

She is part of an important group of Portuguese composers who appeared in the 1980s.

== Career ==
Her music has been performed in Portugal, Spain, France, Austria, Belgium, Bulgaria, Italy, Hungary, Switzerland, Poland, Sweden, the Czech Republic, Hong Kong, Macao, South Korea, Argentina, Brazil, Cuba and the United States.

She has had several works released on CD by the publishers Portugalsom and Strauss, EMI Classics, Nova Música, Capella, Deux-Elles, Numérica, ISCM-WMD, Miso Records, Plancton, IPCB and Musicamera, as well as scores published by Musicoteca, Fermata, Cecilia Honegger, IPCB and MIC.

She has been Professor of Composition, Theory and Musical Analysis in the Department of Communication and Art of the University of Aveiro since 1995.

She has been the director of the CIME (Center for Research in Electroacoustic Music of UA) since 2014, having created the EAW (Electroacoustic Winds) platform. She has been a member of the Scientific Council of the Portuguese Music Research Center (CIMP) since 2008

== Highlighted works of her catalogue ==
- Contornos (1987), winner of the JMP Exposition Competition and "The 1998 ISCM-ACL World Music Days", Hong Kong;
- ... A soir j'ai assis la Beauté sur mes genoux - Et je l'ai trouvée amère (1998), for chamber group, commissioned by Culturgest
- Inscriptions sur une Peinture (1998), for chamber orchestra, commissioned by Teatro Nacional S. Carlos.
- Heart I, II – 2001, guitar solo
- Heart III – 2014, for guitar and bass flute, commissioned by Grupo Machina Lírica Duo
- Cycle Anamorphoses – 1993–2019:
  - Anamorphoses III (1995), for violin and electronics;
  - Anamorphoses VII (2002), for chamber orchestra, commissioned by Casa da Música;
  - Anamorphoses VIII (2014), commissioned by DGartes – DuoContracello;
  - Anamorphoses IX (2018) for cello and orchestra, commissioned by Casa da Música;
  - Anamorphoses VIII (2019) for cello, double bass, electronics and image, commissioned by Duo Contracello
- Cycle Mémoires d'Automne (1999–2003):
  - Image I, for solo marimba.
- Cycle Le Navigateur du Soleil Incandescent (2005–2016):
  - Première lettre (2005), viola and piano, commissioned by Festival of Póvoa do Varzim;
  - Deuxième lettre (2006), counter-tenor, choir and orchestra, commissioned by
- Gulbenkian Foundation;
  - Paradeisoi'' (2007), orchestra, commissioned by F. C. Gulbenkian.
  - Quatrième lettre (2010), Chamber group, commissioned by Miso Music.
  - Première lettre (2016), flutes and piano;
- Shakespeare's Cycle – 2007–2014:
  - Since Brass nor stone ... (2007), soprano and electronic;
  - Kingdom of the Shore (2012), voice, video and electronics. commissioned by Festivais de Outono
- Cycle Four Elements (2014–2015):
  - O Dragão Watatsumi (2015), six percussionists, order DGartes – Drumming group
- Ferreira, António: Miso Music Portugal: A History of Electroacoustic Music in Portugal [www.cime-icem.net/Doc/Portugal.doc], accessed 8 February 2010
- Mention of Soveral's Anamorphoses (1994)
