= Joël-François Durand =

French composer

Joël-François Durand (born 17 September 1954) is a French composer.

== Biography ==
Born in Orléans, Durand studied mathematics, music education and piano in Paris, then composition with Brian Ferneyhough in Freiburg im Breisgau, Germany (1981–84), and at Stony Brook University, New York, with Arel and Semegen (1984–86) (Weid 2001). Between 1979 and 1984 he attended masterclasses by György Ligeti and Luciano Berio at the Centre Acanthes in Aix-en-Provence, and with Luigi Nono at the Freiburg Musikhochschule. In 1981–82 he was awarded a scholarship from the DAAD (German Academic Exchange Service) (Bernard 2006, 247–48). In 1982 he received a Darmstadt Institute Scholarship for his String Trio, and in 1983 his piano piece ...d'asiles déchirés... was awarded a prize at the Third International K.H. Stockhausen Composition Competition in Brescia, Italy. He left Europe in 1984 to pursue a PhD in Composition (awarded in 1988) at Stony Brook University (USA), where he studied composition with Bülent Arel and electronic music with Daria Semegen.

Durand was awarded scholarships from the Fulbright Foundation (1984) and from the French Ministry of Culture (1985). He received the Kranichsteiner Musikpreis from the Darmstadt Internationalen Ferienkurse in 1990. He was appointed assistant professor in composition at the University of Washington in 1991, and was invited to teach at the University of California, San Diego in the autumn of 1992 (Weid 2001). During the 1980-90s, he was regularly invited as a lecturer at the summer courses at Darmstädter Ferienkurse. He taught at the annual mastercourse at the Fondation Royaumont in France in 1993. He is currently Professor of Composition (Anon. n.d.), and since 2002 Associate Director of the University of Washington School of Music (Anon. n.d.).

In parallel to his activity as composer, Durand designs and manufactures high-end tonearms for record players. He founded the company Durand Tonearms LLC in 2009.

== Works ==
Orchestral works

- Piano Concerto (1993) – 22'
- Five Musical Tales (1998) – 14'
- Athanor (2000–2001) – 20'
- Le Tombeau de Rameau III (2014) – 16'
- Tropes de : Bussy (2017–18) – 25'

Chamber music and works for ensemble

- String Trio (1981) – 7'
- So er (1985) for 20 instruments – 11'
- Lichtung (1987) for 10 instruments – 12'
- Die innere Grenze (1988) for string sextet – 25'
- Un feu distinct (1991) for flute, clarinet, piano, violin and cello – 15'
- B.F., ein Mittelpunkt (1992) for 8 instruments – 3'
- La terre et le feu (1999) for oboe and ensemble – 18'
- La mesure des choses III. La mesure de la terre et du feu (1999) for oboe and viola – 12'
- Cinq Duos (1999) for violin and viola – 14'
- In the mirror land (2003) for flute and oboe; also versions for flute and B♭ clarinet and for B♭ clarinet and oboe – 6'
- Ombre/Miroir (2004) for flute and 14 instruments – 14'
- String Quartet (2005) – 21'
- Le Tombeau de Rameau (2008) for flute, viola, and harp – 23'
- Hermetic Definition (2012–13) for 10 instruments – 25'
- Cage 100 Party Piece (2013) for ensemble – 1'
- Mundus Imaginalis (2015) for 14 instruments – 17'
- Geister, schwebende Geister (2019–20) for solo viola and 9 instruments – 20'
- String quartet no.2, Cantar de Amigo (2020) – 27'

Works for solo instruments

- Roman (1982) for violin – 8'
- ...d'asiles déchirés... (1983) for piano – 12'
- La mesure des choses I. La mesure de l'air (1992) for B♭ clarinet – 12'
- La mesure des choses II. La mesure de la mer (1993) for piano – 9'
- Le chemin (1994) for piano – 18'
- Un chant lointain (1995) for electronic carillon – 4'
- Les raisons des forces mouvantes (1996) for organ – 16'
- Par le feu receuilli (1997) for flute – 10'
- Au-delà, Cinq Etudes pour Piccolo (1997–98) for piccolo – 7'
- Tiodhlac (2001) for B♭ clarinet – 3'
- Tiodhlac II (2006) for bass clarinet – 4'
- Further reflections on the nature of the mirror (2006) for flute – 8'
- Le Tombeau de Rameau II (2013) for piano – 25'
- Enfance (2015) for piano – 14'
- Yellow and Red (2015) for drum set – 12'
- La mesure des choses IV. La mesure du temps (2017) for one percussionist – 13'
- Geister, wieder... (2020) for solo viola – 15'
- In a weightless quiet (2020) for solo violin – 12'

Vocal music

- Trois Mélodies (1986) for mezzo-soprano and 5 instruments – 6'
- She or not (1998) for barytone – 9'

His music is published by DURAND Editions Musicales, Paris, and Editions Musicales Européennes, Paris, and distributed by Alexander Street Press, and BabelScores (Paris)

== Discography ==
- La mesure des choses I. La mesure de l'air and Tiodhlac

Mathew Nelson, clarinet Soundset Recordings SR1087, 2017

- Roman for solo violin

Eric Rynes, violin Albany Troy1614, 2016

- Ombre/Miroir for flute and ensemble

musikFabrik, Helen Bledsoe (flute), James Wood (conductor) Wergo 68542, Edition musikFabrik CD 04, 2010

- La terre et le feu – Les raisons des forces mouvantes – La mesure des choses III. La mesure de la terre et du feu – Athanor

BBC Symphony Orchestra – London Sinfonietta – Gareth Hulse (oboe) – Paul Silverthorne (viola) – Hans-Ola Ericsson (organ) Mode 139, 2004

- Concerto for piano and orchestra – String Trio – Die innere Grenze

Deutsches Symphonie-Orchester Berlin, Stefan Litwin (piano), Bradley Lubman (conductor) – Trio de l'Ensemble Intercontemporain – Sextuor Schoenberg Naive Montaigne Mo 782093, 1998

== Bibliography ==
- Anon. n.d. "Joël-François Durand". School of Music, University of Washington website (Accessed 29 May 2011).
- Bernard, Jonathan (ed.). 2006. Joël-François Durand in the Mirror Land. Seattle: University of Washington Press, in association with Perspectives of New Music.
- Weid, Jean-Noël von der. 2001. "Durand, Joël-François". The New Grove Dictionary of Music and Musicians, second edition, edited by Stanley Sadie and John Tyrrell. London: Macmillan Publishers.
