= Curlew (band) =

Experimental free jazz group, founded 1979

Curlew is an American experimental free jazz group founded by saxophone player George Cartwright in 1979. Members of the band have included cellist Tom Cora, drummer Pippin Barnett, guitarists Davey Williams and Fred Frith, and bassist Bill Laswell.

== Discography ==
- Curlew (1981, Landslide)
  - George Cartwright saxes and flute; Tom Cora cello; Bill Laswell bass; Nicky Skopelitis guitar; Bill Bacon drums.
  - Note: The double CD release includes Live At CBGBs 1980, with the same lineup except for the drummer, who is Denardo Coleman, Ornette Coleman's son.
- North America (1985, Moers)
  - George Cartwright saxes; Tom Cora cello, accordion; Fred Frith bass, guitar, and producer, Mark Howell guitar; Rick Brown drums; J. Pippin Barnett drums. Guests Butch Morris cornet, Polly Bradfield violin.
- Live in Berlin (1986, Cuneiform)
  - George Cartwright saxes; Tom Cora cello; Wayne Horvitz keyboards and keyboard bass; Davey Williams guitar; Pippin Barnett drums.
- Bee (1990, Cuneiform)
  - George Cartwright saxes; Tom Cora cello; Ann Rupel bass; Davey Williams guitar; Pippin Barnett drums.
- A Beautiful Western Saddle (1993, Cuneiform)
  - George Cartwright saxes; Tom Cora cello; Ann Rupel bass; Davey Williams guitar; Pippin Barnett drums; Amy Denio vocals (Paul Haines lyrics).
  - Note: The double-disc CD/DVD release includes The Hardwood, originally released as a VHS, having video footage from two 1991 concerts, NYC and Washington DC, with the five piece lineup of Cartwright, Cora, Rupel, Williams, Barnett
- Paradise (1995, Cuneiform)
  - George Cartwright saxes; Ann Rupel bass; Davey Williams guitar; Chris Cochrane guitar; Samm Bennett drums. Guest: Jim Spake baritone and sopranino saxes
- Fabulous Drop (1998, Cuneiform)
  - George Cartwright saxes; Ann Rupel bass; Davey Williams guitar; Chris Cochrane guitar; Kenny Wolleson drums.
- Meet the Curlews! (2002, Cuneiform)
  - George Cartwright saxes; Fred Chalenor bass; Davey Williams guitar; Bruce Golden drums; Chris Parker piano and electric piano
- Mercury (2003, Cuneiform)
  - George Cartwright saxes; Fred Chalenor bass; Dean Granros guitar; Bruce Golden drums; Chris Parker piano and electric piano
- Gussie [live 2001] (2003, Roaratorio)
  - George Cartwright saxes; Fred Chalenor bass; Davey Williams guitar; Bruce Golden drums; Chris Parker piano and electric piano
- Curlew CBGS's 1987 (2022, Cuneiform)
  - George Cartwright saxes; Tom Cora cello; Davey Williams guitar; Ann Rupel bass; Pippin Barnett drums
- Live at Phantasmagoria and WFMU (2022, Cuneiform)
  - George Cartwright saxophones; Davey Williams guitar; Chris Cochrane guitar; Ann Rupel bass; Kenny Wollesen drums
