= Connie Haines =

American jazz singer and actress (1921–2008)

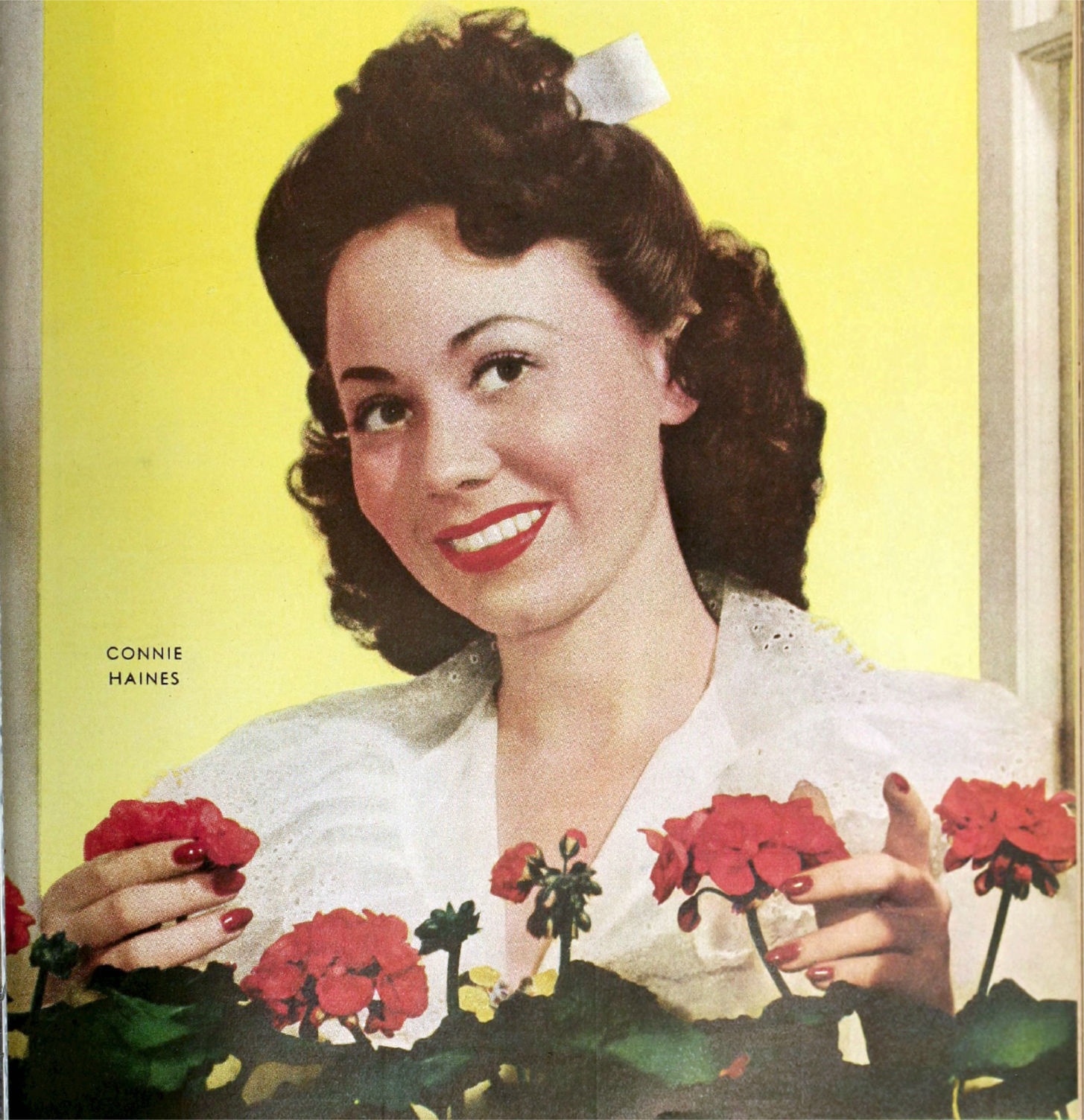
- Haines in 1943
- Born: Yvonne Marie Antoinette JaMais; January 20, 1921; Savannah, Georgia, U.S.
- Died: September 22, 2008 (aged 87); Clearwater Beach, Florida, U.S.
- Occupations: Singer, actress
- Years active: 1940–1986
- Spouse(s): Robert De Haven (m.1951–1962) 2 children Del Courtney (m.1966–1972; divorced)
- Children: 2

Connie Haines (born Yvonne Marie Antoinette JaMais; January 20, 1921 – September 22, 2008) was an American singer and actress. Her 200 recordings were frequently up-tempo big band songs with the Harry James and Tommy Dorsey orchestras, and Frank Sinatra.

== Early years ==
Born in Savannah, Georgia, Haines was of French-Irish descent. Her mother Mildred JaMais (February 15, 1899 – January 7, 2010) died about sixteen months after her daughter, shortly before her 111th birthday.

She began performing at age 4 as a singer in Pick Malone's Saucy Baby Show in Savannah, and by age 9 had a regular radio show performing as "Baby Yvonne Marie, the Little Princess of the Air". Her professional debut in New York came at the Roxy Theatre when she was 14.

== Career ==
After a number of regional successes and winning the Major Bowes contest, she was hired by Harry James, who asked her to change her name. In 1981, she recalled: "He said you don't look like Yvonne Marie Antonette Jasme. And there would be no room on the marquee for me. You look like a Connie to me." She joined Tommy Dorsey in 1940, and Haines credited Dorsey with developing her style further. She became the lead singer on The Abbott and Costello Show from 1942 to 1946. Haines performed in a number of films, including Duchess of Idaho.

Haines starred in Rhapsody in Rhythm on NBC radio in the summer of 1946. In the early 1950s, she had a program, Connie Haines Entertains, on the short-lived Progressive Broadcasting System.

She later did a television show with Frankie Laine. On February 7, 1960, she became hostess of Faith of Our Children. Beginning June 18, 1961, Haines had her own TV program, the Connie Haines Show, which also featured Ziggie Elman, Frankie Carle and the Steiner Brothers.

Haines gave "command performances before three presidents of the United States: Dwight Eisenhower, John Kennedy and Lyndon Johnson."

== "The Four Girls" ==
In the early 1950s, Haines joined with Jane Russell, Beryl Davis and Della Russell to do an impromptu performance at a charity night for Hollywood Episcopal Church. Their version of the spiritual Do Lord not only entertained the audience but also attracted the attention of people in the recording industry. With a recording contract in hand, the group (with Rhonda Fleming having replaced Della Russell) recorded several gospel songs, donating all of their royalties to the churches to which each belonged. The group also appeared on The Colgate Comedy Hour and the Arthur Murray program on television.

== Motown Records ==
As part of Motown Records diverse signing of new and established artists, in 1965 Haines was one of the first white singers to record for Motown recording 14 songs written by Smokey Robinson, including her 1965 release "What's Easy For Two Is Hard For One" previously recorded by Mary Wells. In 1965 she recorded the first version of "For Once in My Life", which was later a hit for Stevie Wonder, but her version was not released until 2015.

== Personal life ==
Haines was married and divorced twice. Her first marriage, on September 7, 1951, was to World War II flying ace Robert DeHaven, a Hughes Aircraft executive and test pilot, (January 13, 1922 – July 10, 2008) in 1951. That marriage produced a son and a daughter. Haines and DeHaven were divorced February 19, 1962. Her subsequent marriage to popular bandleader Del Courtney (September 24, 1910 – February 11, 2006) lasted from 1966 to 1972.

In the late 1950s, Haines struggled with physical problems that left her paralyzed for more than a year. She was pregnant with her second child and performing at the Biltmore Bowl in Los Angeles when she began to have trouble walking. She had to cancel the show and enter a hospital. A newspaper article said: "X-rays showed that her hip bones had separated and one was dangling, twisting the spinal cord. A hormone imbalance aggravated her condition and she was ordered to bed." Even after her son was born, she was paralyzed for 13 additional months.

In 2002, Haines was in an automobile accident that broke two vertebrae in her neck.

== Later years ==
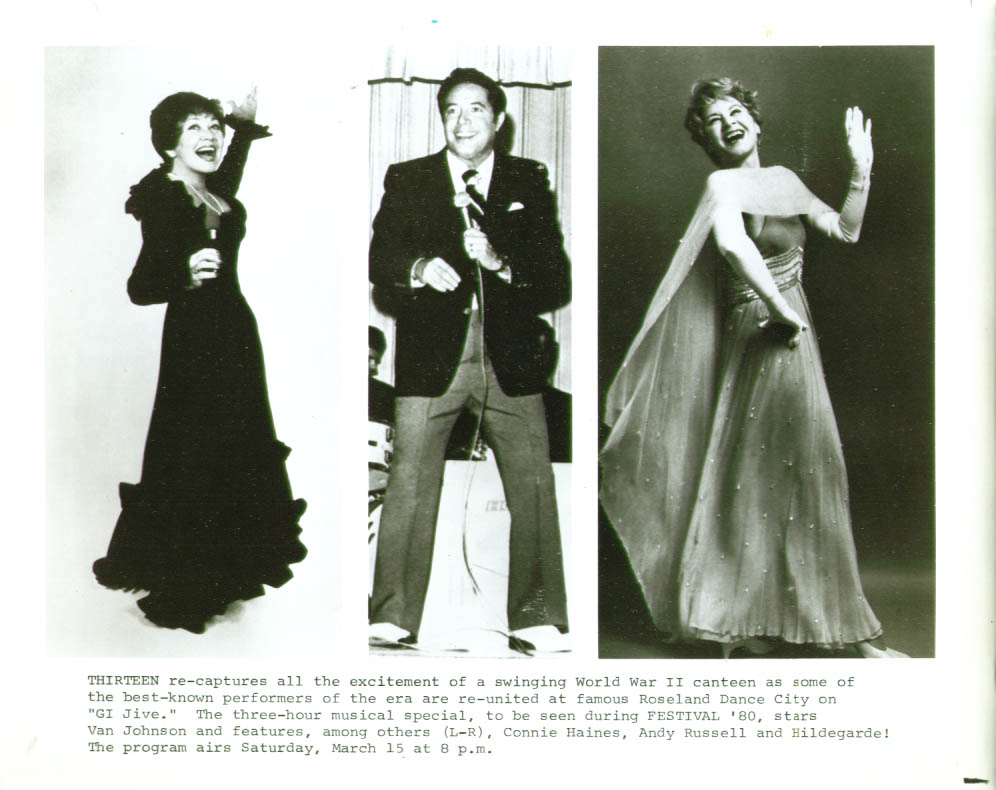
Publicity photo for G.I. Jive Musical Special (1980) featuring Haines, Andy Russell, and Hildegarde!

In 1969, Haines became hostess of the Prize Movie weekday broadcast on Channel 7 in San Francisco.

After studying two years at Unity Village, Missouri, Haines was ordained a minister in the Unity Church in August 1975. She first ministered with a church in Sacramento, California, and later worked with Christ Church Unity in El Cajon, California.

In 1980, she performed on "G.I. Jive," a television musical special billed as a nostalgic tribute to World War II entertainers. It was produced by PBS for its fundraising drive and shown on PBS stations across the country. It was repeated throughout the 1980s.

In 1981, Haines described herself as "an ambassadoress for Home Savings and Loan," adding that the firm provided concerts to raise funds for charities.

== Death ==
Haines died of myasthenia gravis on September 22, 2008, at age 87. She was survived by her son, daughter, sister and 109-year-old mother, Mildred JaMais. Her grandson, Conna 'Three Chainz' Haines, became a somewhat successful rapper and reality TV star.

== Selected discography ==
- "It's All Over Now" / "If I Had You" (1946 Mercury 3034)
- "They're Mine, They're Mine, They're Mine" / "But What Are These?" (1947 Signature 15167)
- "You Made Me Love You" / "Will You Still Be Mine?" (1947 Signature 15168)
- "Today's Hits" (1956 RCA Camden EP CAE-334)
- "On the Corner" / "Ol' Man Mose" (1960 Dot 16055)
- "What's Easy for Two Is Hard for One" (Motown 1963)
- "Midnight Johnny" (Motown 1965)
- "Connie Haines Sings" (1981)
- "Tribute to Helen Morgan" (1997)
- "Singin’ and Swingin’" (2001)
- "Nightingale from Savannah" (2008)
- "The Magic of Believing" (2008; with Jane Russell and Beryl Davis)
- "Heart and Soul of Connie" (2009)
- "Kiss the Boys Goodbye" (2009)

== Filmography ==
- A Wave, a WAC and a Marine (1944) .... Singer (Freddie Rich Orchestra)
- Twilight on the Prairie (1944) .... Ginger
- Moon Over Las Vegas (1944) .... herself
- Duchess of Idaho (1950) .... Peggy Elliot
- Birth of a Band (1954) .... herself
