= George Cartwright (musician) =

American musician

- Born: December 10, 1950 (age 75); Midnight, Mississippi, United States
- Genre: Avant-garde jazz
- Occupations: Musician, composer
- Instrument: Saxophone
- Years active: 1970s–present
- Member of: Curlew

George Cartwright (born December 10, 1950, in Midnight, Mississippi) is an American musician, best known as the founder of the band Curlew in 1979 in New York City. Besides playing soprano, alto, and tenor saxophones, he has composed music for Curlew, his own solo recordings and other music ensembles such as Zeitgeist. He attended the Creative Music Studio in Woodstock, New York, and currently resides in Minnesota.

== Recordings ==
- The Hardwood'’(Cuneiform, 1992)
- Mercury (Cuneiform, 2003)
- Gussie [live] (Roaratorio, 2003)
- Live in Berlin (Cuneiform, 1986)
- North America (Moers, 1986)
- Bee (Cuneiform, 1991)
- A Beautiful Western Saddle (Lyrics by Paul Haines) (Cuneiform, 1993)
- Paradise (Cuneiform, 1996)
- Fabulous Drop (Cuneiform, 1998)
- North America (Cuneiform, 2002)
- Curlew (Landslide, 1984)

=== Solo ===
- DOT (Cuneiform/Rune, 1994)
- The Memphis Years (Lyrics by Paul Haines, Vocals by Amy Denio) (Cuneiform/Rune, 2000)
- Black Ants Crawling (Innova Recordings, 2002)
- Send Help (Innova Recordings, 2008)
- Hog's Grease (Mahakala Records, 2024)

=== with Michael Lytle ===
- Red Rope:3 Pieces for 2 Players (Cadence, 1997)

=== With The Snaildartha 6 ===
- Snaildartha: The Story of Jerry the Christmas Snail (Innova Recordings, 2004)
