= Rain Worthington =

American composer of classical music

Rain Worthington is an American composer of classical music. Her influences include world music, minimalism, and romanticism. Writing in Chamber Music magazine, Kyle Gann said "...her music takes ideas of American musical style to a new place - like a walk in a familiar, yet very different park... And isn't afraid to come up with its own startling conclusions." The music journalist Bob Briggs noted, "...she writes music which speaks to the senses, is packed with real emotion and, most important of all in contemporary music, really communicates." She has been awarded grants from Meet The Composer, ASCAP, the American Music Center, NYFA, and the American Composers Forum. Worthington also serves as Artistic Administrator and Composer Advocate for the New York Women Composers.

== Compositions ==
There is a complete list at the composer's website.

== Selected discography ==
There is a complete list at the composer's website.

- Moods Tracks 12-15: "Hourglass", "Tangents", "Dark Dreams", "Always Almost" - Although Briggs finds Worthington's contribution to the collection "...best of the bunch..." he says the album is "...far too serious, with no let-up, or gentle light relief from relentless greyness."
- Resisting reason
- Shredding glass - A response to the September 11 attacks, Briggs notes for its "...dreamscape of exquisite allure..."
- North Moore Street Loft, 2nd Concert: Solo Piano, Parts 1-3
- If Only Knowing: "Images", "Summer Nights", "Fastcity", "Crosswinds", "If Only Knowing", "Conversation Before the Rain", "Through Momentum", "Longing", "Sad Laughter"
- Yet Still Night: A Nocturne for Orchestra - Briggs says "...her use of chromaticism to convey anguish, is very effective."
- Confluences - Writing for MusicWeb-International, Paul Shoemaker states "You'll be glad when its over ..." but relents with "...perhaps it is the rhythmically flat performance here that is mostly at fault."
- Dream Vapors: Selected Works for Orchestra Navona Records NV6025 (2016)

== See also ==
- Jill Burton
