= Robert M. DeHaven =

American flying ace (1922–2008)

Robert Marshall DeHaven
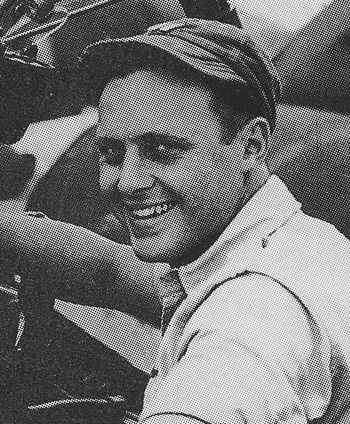
- Born: January 13, 1922; San Diego, California, U.S.
- Died: July 10, 2008 (aged 86); Encino, California, U.S.
- Military career
- Allegiance: United States of America
- Branch: United States Army Air Forces; United States Air Force Reserve; California Air National Guard
- Service years: 1942–1965
- Rank: Colonel
- Nickname: Bob
- Units: 7th Fighter Squadron, 49th Fighter Group
- Conflicts: World War II
- Awards: Silver Star (2); Distinguished Flying Cross (3); Air Medal (14)

Robert Marshall DeHaven (January 13, 1922 – July 10, 2008) was an American flying ace in the 49th Fighter Group during World War II, who was credited with 14 aerial victories. After the war, he briefly worked as an actor before becoming a personal pilot for billionaire Howard Hughes.

== Early life ==
DeHaven was born on 1922 in San Diego. He graduated from North Hollywood High School in Los Angeles, before attending Washington and Lee University in Virginia.

== Military career ==
On April 14, 1942, he enlisted in the Aviation Cadet Program of the U.S. Army Air Forces, and was commissioned a second lieutenant and awarded his pilot wings at Luke Field in Arizona, on January 4, 1943.

=== World War II ===
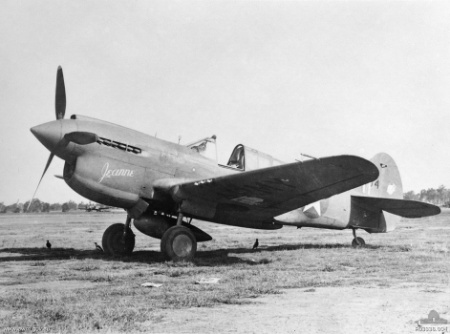
P-40E of the 7th Fighter Squadron

After the completion of his training in the P-40 Warhawk training in Florida, he was assigned to the 73d Fighter Squadron of the 318th Fighter Group in Hawaii. During this time, American fighter units in the South West Pacific Area were desperately short of qualified pilots and as a result, DeHaven was assigned to the 7th Fighter Squadron of the 49th Fighter Group in May 1943. Arriving to New Guinea via Australia, he was stationed at the 49th FG's base at Dobodura Airfield in New Guinea, where he flew P-40s in combat.

On July 14, 1943, DeHaven scored his first aerial victory when he shot down an Aichi D3A "Val" dive bomber over Salamaua and on October 17, 1943, he shot down a Nakajima Ki-43 "Oscar". DeHaven shot down a Mitsubishi A6M "Zero" and a Kawasaki Ki-61 "Tony" on October 27.

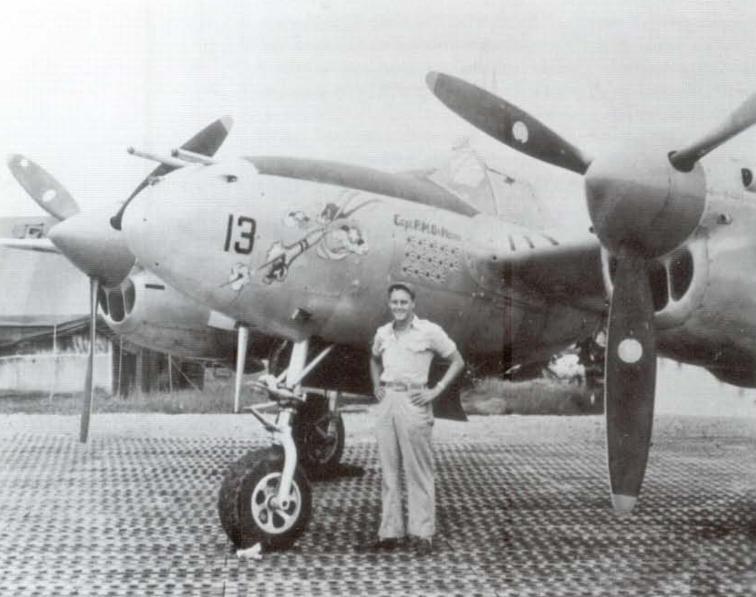
DeHaven with his P-38 Lightning

He became a flying ace on December 10, after he shot down an Oscar near Alexishafen, his fifth aerial victory. Two days later, he shot down another Oscar over Alexishafen. In January 1944, he claimed his seventh and eighth aerial victories, after shooting down a Tony and Oscar. The Oscar shot down by DeHaven in January 1944, was flown by Captain Shigeo Nongo, the executive officer of 59th Sentai, who was killed in action. On March 15, he downed another Oscar and he scored his tenth and last aerial victory in the P-40 on May 7, making him and another flying ace of 49th FG Ernest A. Harris, the top aerial victory scorers in the P-40 Warhawk within the V Fighter Command.

In the summer of 1944, the 49th FG converted to Lockheed P-38 Lightnings and took part in the Philippines campaign. On October 29, 1944, DeHaven shot down an Oscar over Biliran Island, his first aerial victory in the P-38 and eleventh overall. He scored his final victories in November 1944, when he shot down two Zeros and one Mitsubishi J2M "Jack" during aerial patrols over Leyte. At the end of November, he was sent back to the United States for shore leave. In 1945, he returned to the 49th FG as group operations officer, serving this position till V-J Day.

During World War II, DeHaven was credited with the destruction of 14 enemy aircraft (10 in P-40 and 4 in P-38) in aerial combat, while flying 272 combat missions. He left active duty in December 1945.

== Later life ==
On 1946, he joined the United States Air Force Reserves and California Air National Guard, where he worked as an acceptance test pilot for the Lockheed P-80 Shooting Star. After being spotted by a Hollywood talent agent, he signed a contract with Columbia Pictures and starred in minor roles in three films from 1946 to 1947. While in Hollywood, DeHaven met billionaire and founder of Hughes Aircraft Company Howard Hughes, who offered DeHaven a job as his personal pilot and test pilot for Hughes Aircraft Company. He served as an executive and later became director of the flight test division of Hughes Aircraft Company. He retired from the Air Force Reserves on October 1, 1965. He was elected a Fellow in the Society of Experimental Test Pilots and also served as president of the American Fighter Aces Association. He completely retired in the 1980s.

On September 7, 1951, DeHaven married singer and actress Connie Haines, with whom he had a son and a daughter. Haines and DeHaven divorced on February 19, 1962. He later remarried to Diane Kwasniewicz and had another son.

DeHaven died on July 10, 2008, at a hospital in Encino after a long illness.

== Filmography ==
| Year | Title | Role | Notes |
|---|---|---|---|
| 1946 | Crime Doctor's Man Hunt | Sailor | Uncredited |
| 1946 | Gallant Journey | Jim Logan (as a boy) | |
| 1947 | Blondie's Big Moment | Pete | Uncredited |

== Awards and decorations ==

U.S. Air Force Command Pilot Badge
| Silver Star with bronze oak leaf cluster | Distinguished Flying Cross with two bronze oak leaf clusters | Air Medal with two silver and two bronze oak leaf clusters |
| Air Medal (second ribbon required for accoutrement spacing) | Air Force Presidential Unit Citation with bronze oak leaf cluster | American Campaign Medal |
| Asiatic-Pacific Campaign Medal with four bronze campaign stars | World War II Victory Medal | National Defense Service Medal |
| Air Force Longevity Service Award | Armed Forces Reserve Medal with bronze hourglass device | Philippine Liberation Medal with service star |
