= Terese Svoboda =

American poet

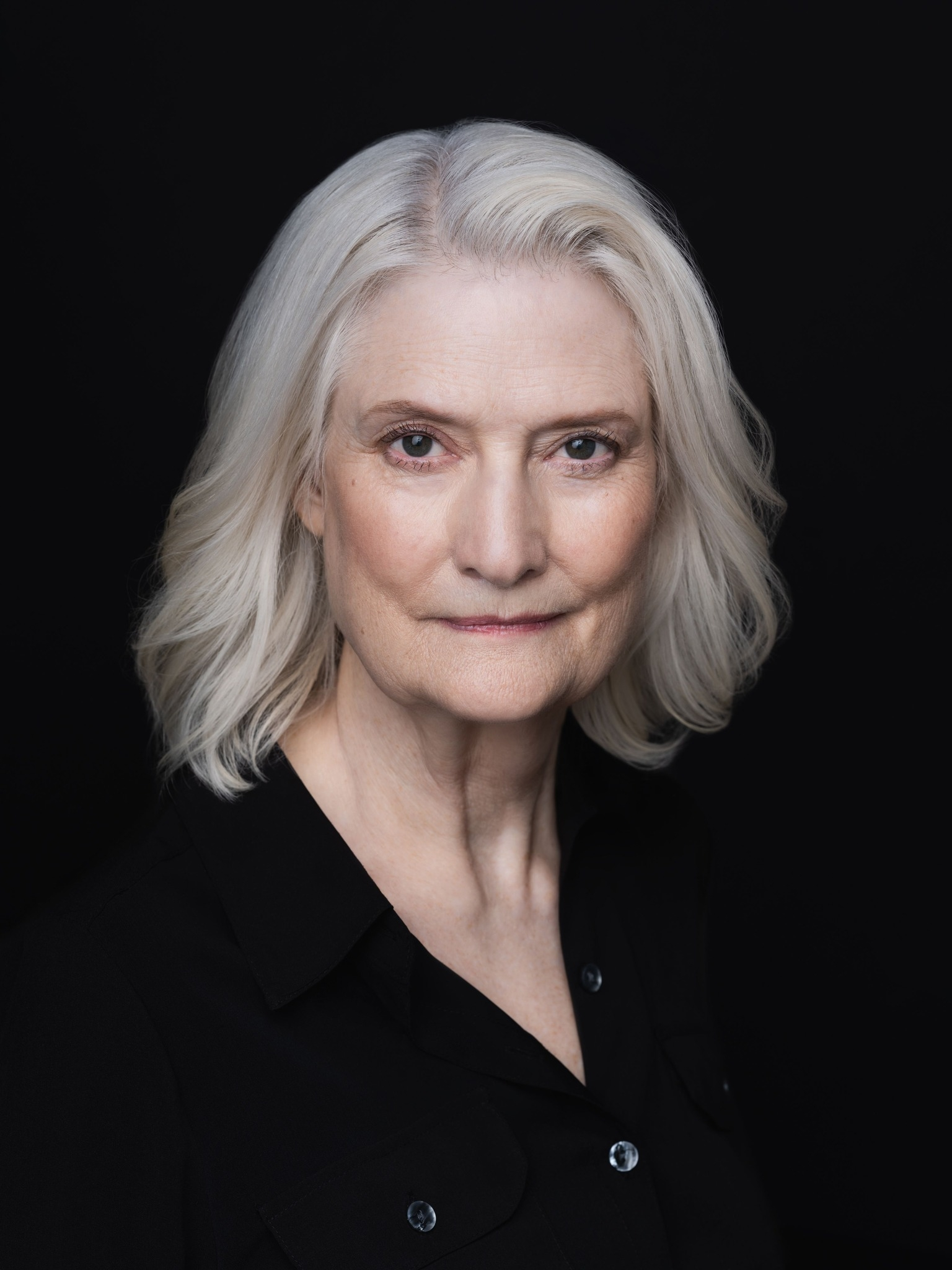

Terese Svoboda is an American poet, novelist, memoirist, short story writer, librettist, translator, biographer, critic and videomaker.

== Career ==
Svoboda is the author of nine books of poetry, eight novels, three collections of short fiction, a biography, two memoirs and a book of translations from the Nuer.

She graduated from Columbia University School of the Arts. She was Distinguished Writer in Residence at University of Hawaii. and McGee Visiting professor of writing at Davidson College. Wichita State Distinguished Writer in Residence, University of Miami, Columbia University School of the Arts. Atlantic Center for the Arts Pabst Endowed Chair,

Anne LeBaron's 2005 opera Wet, for which Svoboda wrote the libretto, premiered at RedCat at L.A. Disney Hall in 2005. Her fourteen works in video have won numerous awards and are distributed worldwide. In writing about her work, reviewers have noted her frequent use of humor to address dire subjects, her interest in fabulism, and her lyrical use of language, especially as a poet writing prose.

An ardent unconventional feminist, she often writes about women in the Midwest in a way that has been termed "exotic, sophisticated, and heartbreaking." Her travels for the Smithsonian's Anthropology Film Archive to the South Pacific and the South Sudan provide additional settings. Postwar Japan is the location for her memoir about executions of U.S. servicemen by U.S. authorities.

Her work has appeared in AGNI, Granta, The New Yorker, The Atlantic, Poetry, The New York Times, Narrative, Slate, Paris Review. The New York Post described her memoir, Black Glasses Like Clark Kent as "astounding"; The Washington Post regarded her biography Anything That Burns You as "magisterial."

== South Sudan ==
After translating the songs of the Nuer people of the South Sudan on a PEN/Columbia Fellowship, she founded a scholarship for Nuer high school students in Nebraska. She was consulting producer for "The Quilted Conscience," a PBS documentary on South Sudanese girls learning to quilt with Nebraskan women.

== Critical reception ==
Hailed as one of "our best writers" by Karen Russell, her fiction has been likened to Lauren Groff, Helen DeWitt, George Saunders, and Amy Hempel. Her career was discussed at the 'LILAC: Laboratoire interuniversitaire de littérature américaine contemporaine' at the Sorbonne University. Her second memoir, Hitler and My Mother-in-Law, received a Publishers Weekly star. Roxy and Coco, her most recent novel and first speculative, and The Long Swim, her third story collection, were praised in a full page of the New York Times Book Review.

Electric Lit said of 'Dog on Fire' that it was "a richly imagined novel from a writer at the top of her form." Praised by Karen Russell in Esquire, Great American Desert was also lauded by the Los Angeles Review of Books. Emily St. John Mandel wrote on The Millions that Pirate Talk and Mermalade was "a strange and nastily beautiful book" and that Tin God is the work of "a true original." Bohemian Girl was one of 10 Best Westerns of 2012, according to Booklist. Cannibal, her first novel, was deemed "a woman's Heart of Darkness in Vogue. Cleaned the Crocodile's Teeth, Translation of Nuer Song was chosen for the New York Times Writer's Choice column, and praised by Anthropos with "She approaches the Nuer not as an alien, exotic society but as people whose artistic expression may hold meaning and pleasure for any reader."

Brooklyn Rail said of her Selected Poems, When the Next Big War Blows Down the Valley: "Terese Svoboda is one of few contemporary American writers who possesses a global consciousness." Her book of poetry, Theatrix: Poetry Plays was cited by Compulsive Reader as "witty, irreverent, provocative," and Virginia Konchan wrote that "Theatrix: Poetry Plays is a tour de force collection that explodes our notion of the fourth wall."

Entropy included it in 'Best of 2020-2021 Poetry Books'. Compulsive Reader also quotes The Bloomsbury Review's comment that Svoboda is "one of those writers you would be tempted to read regardless of the setting or the period or the plot or even the genre." In addition to the libretto for WET, many of her poems have been set to music, including 'Orlando' as "gun gun gun" by Errolyn Wallen performed at the Crypt on the Green in London and recorded on the Hermes Experiment Album Here We Are. Three of her books have been reissued.

Cary Nelson, editor of the Anthology of American Poetry, said of her biography Anything That Burns You: A Portrait of Lola Ridge, Radical Poet: "No one who cares about American culture will want to miss this book." Svoboda also provided the afterword for Willa Cather's My Antonia (Signet Classics, 2014); and the introduction to Genevieve Taggard To Test the Joy: Selected Poems and Prose (Boiler House Press, 2023). She is a board member of Women Writing Women's Lives.

== Selected awards ==
- 1973 Hannah del Vecchio Award in Playwriting
- 1974 PEN/Columbia Translation Fellow
- 1978 National Endowment for the Humanities grant in translation
- 1983 Creative Artist Public Service fellow
- 1985 Emily Dickinson Award, Poetry Society of America
- 1987 Cecil Hemley Award, Poetry Society of America
- 1988 Jerome Foundation Fellow
- 1990 Iowa Poetry Prize
- 1990 Appleman Foundation grant for video
- 1990 New York State Council for the Arts grant for video
- 1992 Margaret Sanger: A Public Nuisance, co-director/writer of an ITVS-produced video selected by The Getty as one of the best two experimental biographies of the decade
- 1994 Bobst Prize and the Great Lakes Colleges Association New Writers Award
- 1998, 1993 New York Foundation for the Arts fellowship
- 1998 Walter E. Dakin Fellow in fiction, Sewanee Writing Conference
- 2003 Pushcart Prize for an essay
- 2005 Appleman Foundation for WET libretto
- 2007 Graywolf Nonfiction Prize
- 2008 Best of Japan 2008 in the Japan Times for Black Glasses Like Clark Kent
- 2013 Guggenheim Fellowship in fiction
- 2013 Money for Women Barbara Deming Memorial Fund
- 2015 James Merrill House Fellowship
- 2024 Juniper Prize
- 2025 Literary Awards Program Winner, Santa Fe Writers Project.

== Video ==
Svoboda's video work include exhibition in 'Exchange and Evolution' as part of the Getty's Pacific Standard Time exhibition at RedCat, Ars Electronica, PBS, MoMA, WNYC, L.A.C.E., Lifestyle TV, Berlin Videofest, Art Institute of Chicago, CalArts, AFI, Long Beach Museum of Art, New American Makers, Athens Film Festival, Ohio Film Festival, American Film Festival, Atlanta Film Festival (Director's Choice), L.A. Freewaves, Pacific Film Archives, Columbus Film Festival, and Worldwide Video Festival. She was awarded a Jerome Foundation Award in Film and Video and an early Independent Television Service (ITVS) grant from the Corporation of Public Broadcasting for her work in media. She also co-curated 'Between Word and Image' for the Museum of Modern Art and Poets House, an exhibition that traveled to Banff and the Northwest Film Center. Her work is distributed by Vtape.

== Bibliography ==
=== Poetry ===
- All Aberration. ISBN 0-8203-0807-2 / ISBN 978-0-87745-272-0 / eBook ISBN 978-1-58729-235-4
- Laughing Africa. Iowa Prize in Poetry, ISBN 978-0-87745-272-0 / ISBN 9780877452805 / eISBN 978-1-58729-2354
- Mere Mortals. ISBN 0820334243 / ISBN 9780820334240
- Treason ISBN 0970817762 / ISBN 9780970817761
- Weapons Grade. ISBN 1557289069 / ISBN 9781557289063
- Dogs Are Not Cats (chapbook). ISBN 9780988549036
- When the Next Big War Blows Down the Valley: Selected and New Poems. ISBN 1934695459 / ISBN 9781934695456
- Professor Harriman's Steam Air-Ship. ISBN 9781911335184
- Theatrix: Poetry Plays. ISBN 1934695696

=== Novels ===
- Cannibal. Bobst Prize and the Great Lakes Colleges Association First Fiction Prize, ISBN 0814780121
- A Drink Called Paradise. ISBN 1582430012 / ISBN 9781582430010
- Tin God. John Gardner Fiction book Award Finalist, ISBN 9780803245754
- Pirate Talk or Mermalade. ISBN 978-0-982631-80-5
- Bohemian Girl. Booklist Ten Best Westerns 2012, ISBN 9780803226821
- Dog on Fire. ISBN 9781496235169
- Roxy and Coco. ISBN 9781959000068

=== Short fiction ===
- Trailer Girl and Other Stories. ISBN 1582430853 / ISBN 9781582430850
- Great American Desert. ISBN 978-0814255209
- The Long Swim. Juniper Prize for Fiction ISBN 978-1-62534-807-4

=== Non-fiction ===
Biography

- Anything That Burns You: A Portrait of Lola Ridge, Radical Poet. ISBN 9781943156573

Memoirs

- Black Glasses Like Clark Kent. Graywolf Nonfiction Prize ISBN 9781555974909
- Hitler and My Mother-in-Law ISBN 978-1682196519

Translations

- Cleaned the Crocodile's Teeth (Nuer) ISBN 978-0912678634
