= Gallant Journey =

1946 film by William A. Wellman

- Theatrical film poster
- Directed by: William A. Wellman
- Screenplay by: Byron Morgan; William A. Wellman
- Produced by: William A. Wellman
- Starring: Glenn Ford; Janet Blair; Charles Ruggles
- Cinematography: Burnett Guffey; George B. Meehan, Jr.; Elmer Dyer
- Edited by: Al Clark
- Music by: Marlin Skiles
- Production company: Columbia Pictures
- Distributed by: Columbia Pictures
- Release date: September 24, 1946
- Running time: 86 minutes
- Country: United States
- Language: English

Gallant Journey is a 1946 American historical film written, produced and directed by William A. Wellman and starring Glenn Ford, Janet Blair and Charles Ruggles. The film is a biopic of the early U.S. aviation pioneer John Joseph Montgomery. Gallant Journey depicts his efforts to build and fly gliders, from his childhood through to his death in 1911. The chief stunt pilot for the film was Paul Mantz. It was produced and distributed by Columbia Pictures. It is also known by the alternative title The Great Highway.

== Plot ==
When Father Dick Ball in San Diego, California, recalls his childhood friend, John Joseph Montgomery, he recounts the story of the first American to ever fly a glider in 1883. As early as 1879, John told his girlfriend Regina Cleary about his dreams of flying, although his family was very much opposed to this idea and considered him a fool. Regina believed in him, and secretly supported his work, until the first test flight in 1883, which was successful. John named his flying machine an "aeroplane".

John's prominent father, Zachary Montgomery, who had become Assistant Attorney General of the United States, was keen on keeping his reputation intact. When he received news of his son's endeavors, he told him to stop his foolishness and continue his clergy studies instead.

Father Ball became interested in John's work and supported his research and experiments. Another priest, Father Kenton, turned out to be an aviation enthusiast, and helped John with his inventions, arranging a job for him at a Santa Clara workshop.

John continued his work for a few years, and built several model aircraft, preparing for a full-scale test flight. The only thing standing in his way is a medical condition making him dizzy and causing him to collapse. He is told by a doctor that he will never be able to fly safely suffering from this illness. John is disappointed, but his confidence is renewed when he encounters the parachute enthusiast and performer Dan Mahoney, who offers to pull the glider up in the air with his hot air balloon. The two fathers help John to complete a successful test flight with his new glider. Unfortunately his poor finances prevent him from pursuing his passion for flying any longer, even though many people show their interest in his work.

A series of misfortunes and unfortunate events serve as additional discouragement for John, when Dan crashes and dies during a test flight, and an earthquake destroys his glider. Still John manages to scrape together $25,000 by selling his valuable belongings. He marries Regina, but is later dragged into court by a man who claims to be the rightful owner of an object John sold to get his money. The lengthy trial consumes all of John's money, but the judge rules in his favor at the end.

John decides to give flying one more go and builds his own new glider design. He decides to fly it himself. In mid-air he gets a dizzy spell, loses control and crashes to the ground. He dies from his injuries a few hours later.

== Cast ==
- Glenn Ford as John J. Montgomery
- Janet Blair as Regina 'Ginny' Cleary
- Charlie Ruggles as Jim Montgomery
- Henry Travers as Thomas Logan
- Jimmy Lloyd as Dan Mahoney / Prof. LaSalle
- Charles Kemper as Father 'Dickie Ball'
- Arthur Shields as Father Kenton
- Willard Robertson as Zachary Montgomery
- Selena Royle as Mrs. Zachary Montgomery
- Robert De Haven as Jim Logan, as a boy (as Robert DeHaven)
- Eula Morgan as Mrs. Logan

== Production ==
Principal photography on Gallant Journey took place from March 4 to June 1, 1946. The locations in use were Malibu, Del Monte and the movie ranch at Lasky Mesa, California. Wellman had a passion for flying which was expressed in a number of his films including Wings (1927) which won the first Academy Award for Best Picture, Young Eagles (1930), Central Airport (1933), Men with Wings (1938) and Thunder Birds (1942).

Gallant Journey had its beginnings with the San Diego Junior Chamber of Commerce which had obtained the film rights to a biography on John Montgomery. (Note: The San Diego Junior Chamber of Commerce set up a scholarship fund and erected a statue to Montgomery's memory at the Olsy Mesa site where he had successfully flown.) A number of realistic gliders and balloons were built for the film. A total of 11 gliders that reproduced Montgomery's original three gliders were built. In an attempt to duplicate the balloon launch of a glider at altitude, the stunt nearly was disastrous when the balloon suddenly flew uncontrollably up to 16,000 feet (4,900 m) before the test pilot was able to control the gas release valve and bring the balloon back down to the intended 4,000 feet (1,200 m). The sequence was then shot safely.

The test pilots discovered that the original designs produced for the film that carefully followed the authentic Montgomery designs had to be redesigned in order to ensure safety and stability in flight. The redesigned gliders flew so well that they qualified for a Civil Aviation Authority license to fly. A series of model gliders were also created for use in Gallant Journey.

== Reception ==
Gallant Journey had its world premiere at San Diego, California on September 4, 1946. with its full national release on September 24, 1946. (Note: As part of the publicity for the movie, Columbia Pictures sponsored a cross-country Boston to Los Angeles tour featuring a 1911 vintage auto, the same vintage as Montgomery’s last flight.) In his review for The New York Times, Bosley Crowther considered the film Wellman's "vanity project": "... Mr. Wellman got himself together, helped to write, directed and produced a film called 'Gallant Journey,' intended to acclaim that daring man. But a look at the finished product, which came to Loew's Criterion yesterday, leads one to suspect that Mr. Wellman was quite as cuckoo as Montgomery was thought to be. For this curiously ill-constructed picture about a man who was crazy to fly goes bumping around in clumsy circles and ends up in a miserable heap."

Aviation film historians Hardwick and Schnepf noted that Gallant Journey was "... (a) well-told story" with "Good aerial sequences of gliders and balloons." Film reviewer Leonard Maltin considered the film as "OK, but not as stirring as it's meant to be."

== Radio adaptation ==
Gallant Journey was presented on the Lux Radio Theatre, November 11, 1946. Ford and Blair reprised their screen roles in the adaptation.
