= Douglas Kearney =

American poet (born 1974)

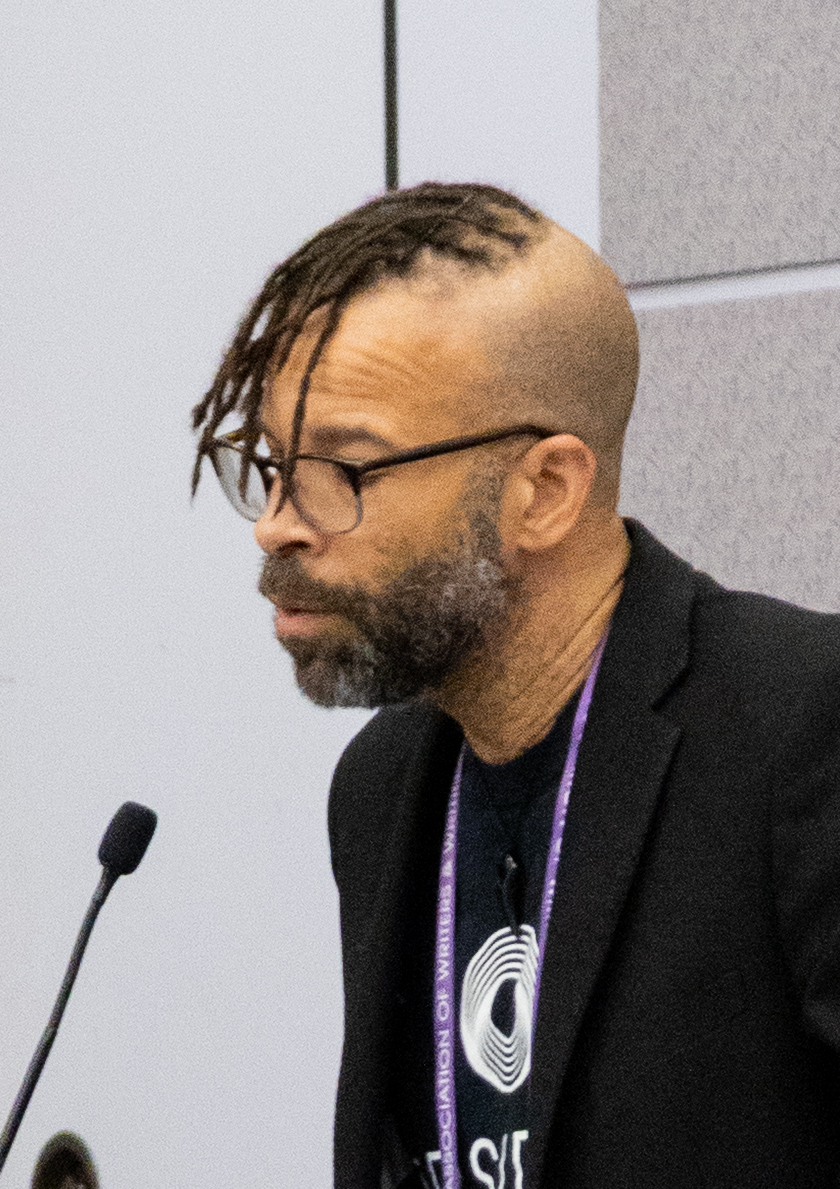
- Kearney at AWP 2025
- Born: 1974 (age 51–52); United States
- Education: Howard University (B.A.); CalArts (M.F.A.)
- Occupations: Poet, writer, teacher, librettist
- Writing career
- Notable awards: Griffin Poetry Prize; National Book Award Poetry Finalist; Pulitzer Prize Poetry Finalist

Douglas Kearney (born 1974) is an American poet, performer, and librettist. Kearney grew up in Altadena, California. His work has appeared in journals and magazines including Poetry, Boston Review, and The Brooklyn Rail. His collection Sho won the 2022 Griffin Poetry Prize and was a finalist for the 2021 National Book Award for Poetry. His collection I Imagine I Been Science Fiction Always was a finalist for the 2026 Pulitzer Prize for Poetry. In 2012, Anne LeBaron's opera Crescent City, with a libretto by Kearney, premiered to critical praise. He is a professor at the University of Minnesota.

== Education ==
Kearney received a B.A. from Howard University and an M.F.A. from California Institute of the Arts.

== Awards and honors ==
Kearney is a graduate and fellow of Cave Canem, and has received support from the Idyllwild Summer Arts Poetry Workshop, the Callaloo Creative Writing Workshops, and the Bread Loaf Writers' Conference.

In 2007, the Poetry Society of America named Kearney a Notable New American Poet. The following year, his second full-length collection, The Black Automaton, was selected for the National Poetry Series. Kearney wrote the libretto for George Lewis's opera The Comet, which was a finalist for the 2025 Pulitzer Prize for Music.

Selected awards and honors
Year	Title	Award	Result	Ref.
2006	"Swimchant for Nigger Mer-folk" (poem)	Coat Hanger Award	Winner	
2008	—	Whiting Award	Winner	
2008	The Black Automaton	National Poetry Series	Selection	
2015	Patter	California Book Award for Poetry	Finalist	
2017	Buck Studies	California Book Award for Poetry	Silver	
2017	Buck Studies	CLMP Firecracker Award for Poetry	Winner	
2017	Buck Studies	Theodore Roethke Memorial Poetry Prize	Winner	
2021	—	Campbell Opera Librettist Prize	Winner	
2021	Sho	National Book Award for Poetry	Finalist	
2022	Sho	Griffin Poetry Prize	Winner	
2022	Sho	Hurston/Wright Legacy Award	Finalist	
2023	Optic Subwoof	CLMP Firecracker Award for Creative Nonfiction	Winner	
2023	Optic Subwoof	Poetry Foundation Pegasus Award for Poetry Criticism	Winner	
2026	I Imagine I Been Science Fiction Always	Pulitzer Prize for Poetry	Finalist	

== Works ==
External videos
- Douglas Kearney @ Valley Contemporary Poets, vimeo

- FEAR, SOME. Red Hen Press. 2006. ISBN 978-1-59709-071-1.
- The Black Automaton. Fence Books. 2009. ISBN 978-1-934200-28-5.
- PATTER. Red Hen Press. 2014. ISBN 978-1-59709-580-8.
- Mess and Mess and. Noemi Press. 2015. ISBN 978-1-93481-951-7.
- Someone Took They Tongues. Subito Press. 2016. ISBN 978-0-9906612-5-2.
- Buck Studies. Fence Books. 2016. ISBN 978-0-98643-737-3.
- Sho. Wave Books. April 2021. ISBN 9781950268153.
- Optic Subwoof. Wave Books. November 2022. ISBN 9781950268672.
- I Imagine I Been Science Fiction Always. Wave Books. April 2025. ISBN 9798891060128.

=== Anthologies ===
- Tony Medina; Louis Reyes Rivera, eds. (2001). Bum Rush the Page: a Def Poetry Jam. Three Rivers Press. ISBN 978-0-609-80840-5.
- Samiya Bashir; Tony Medina; Quarishi Ali Lansana, eds. (2002). Role Call: a generational anthology of social and political Black art & literature. Third World Press. ISBN 978-0-88378-238-5.
- Sheree R. Thomas, ed. (2005). Dark Matter: Reading the Bones. Aspect. ISBN 978-0446693776
- Nikky Finney, ed. (2007). "Big Thicket: Pastoral". The Ringing Ear: Black Poets Lean South. University of Georgia Press. ISBN 978-0-8203-2926-0.
- Mark Eleveld, ed. (2007) Spoken Word Revolution Redux. Sourcebooks MediaFusion. ISBN 978-1402208690
- Sherman Alexie, David Lehman, eds (2015) Best American Poetry 2015 Scribner Press. ISBN 978-1476708201
- Melissa Tuckey, ed. (2018). Ghost Fishing: An Eco-Justice Poetry Anthology. University of Georgia Press. ISBN 978-0820353159.
