= Curlew (album) =

Studio album by Curlew
- Released: 1981
- Recorded: February 29–March 2, 1980 at The Creative Music Studio, NY; February 1980 at CBGB's, NYC
- Genres: Avant-garde jazz, Jazz fusion
- Length: 39:15
- Label: Landslide
- Producer: Curlew

Curlew chronology
| Curlew (1981) | North America (1985) |

Professional ratings
Review scores
| Source | Rating |
|---|---|
| Allmusic | 4/5 stars |

Curlew is the eponymously titled debut studio album by Curlew, released in 1981 by Landslide Records.

== Track listing ==
All compositions by Bill Bacon, George Cartwright, Tom Cora, Bill Laswell and Nicky Skopelitis, unless otherwise stated

Side one
| No. | Title | Writer(s) | Length |
|---|---|---|---|
| 1. | "Panther Burn" | Cartwright | 6:30 |
| 2. | "The Bear" | | 1:45 |
| 3. | "Bitter Thumbs" | Cartwright | 6:00 |
| 4. | "The Victim" | Cartwright | 2:33 |
| 5. | "The Hardwood" | Cartwright | 5:13 |

Side two
| No. | Title | Writer(s) | Length |
|---|---|---|---|
| 1. | "Sports" | Cartwright, Cora | 1:30 |
| 2. | "Bruno" | | 1:00 |
| 3. | "But Get It" | | 2:33 |
| 4. | "Rudders" | Cora | 3:11 |
| 5. | "Binoculars" | | 1:00 |
| 6. | "The Ole Miss Exercise Song" | Cartwright | 8:00 |

== Personnel ==
Curlew

- Bill Bacon – drums, gamelan, percussion
- George Cartwright – flute, saxophone
- Tom Cora – cello, mixing (A1-A3, A5, B2-B6)
- Bill Laswell – bass guitar
- Nicky Skopelitis – guitar

Technical personnel

- Martin Bisi – recording, mixing (A4, B1)
- Curlew – producer
- Michael Lytle – mixing, recording (A1-A4, B1-B3, B5, B6)
- John Slagel – editing

== Release history ==
| Region | Date | Label | Format | Catalog |
|---|---|---|---|---|
| United States | 1981 | Landslide | LP | LD 1004 |
