= LaDonna Smith =

American musician

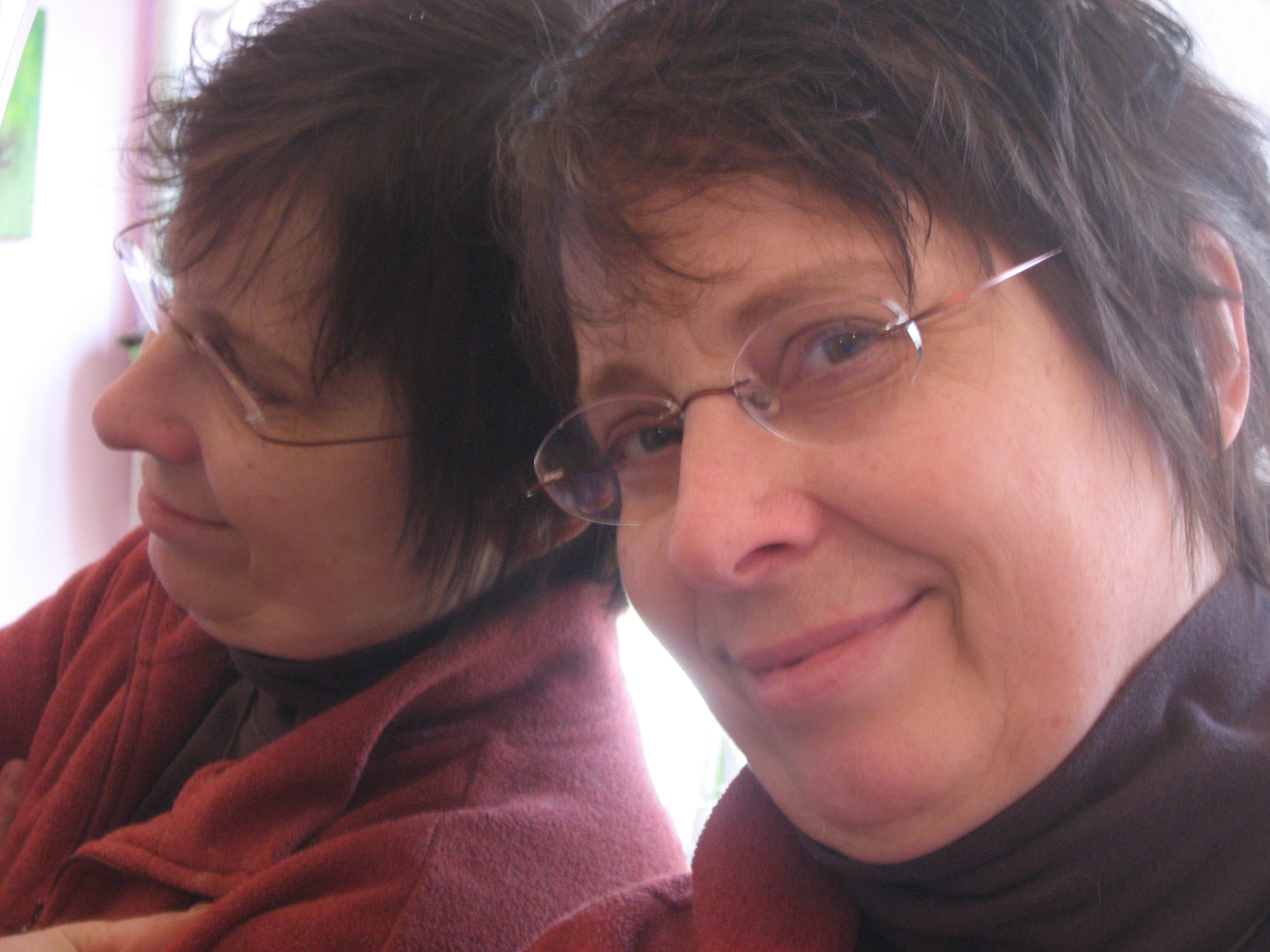
LaDonna Smith in 2010

LaDonna Smith (born 1951) is an American avant garde musician from Alabama. She is a violinist, violist, and pianist. Since 1974 she has been performing free improvisational music with musicians such as Davey Williams, Leland Davis, Michael Evans, Gunther Christmann, Anne Lebaron, Derek Bailey, Eugene Chadbourne, Misha Feigin, Michael Evans, David Sait, Jack Wright, John Russell, Sergey Letov, Toshi Makihara, Andrew Dewar and many other of the world's major improvisers. As a performer, she has toured the US, Canada, Europe, including Russia and Siberia, Korea, India, China and Japan. Her music is documented on dozens of CD and LP recordings, including Say Daybew Records - of Fred Lane & the Debonaires. She produced concerts and festivals in Alabama and the Southeast, including the Birmingham Improv Festival and the improvisor festival. She serves on the Board of Directors of I.S.I.M., the International Society of Improvised Music. In 1976, LaDonna Smith co-founded TransMuseq Records with Davey Williams. In 1980, The Improvisor magazine began as an extension of I.N.: The Improvisor's Network, a grass-roots organization in New York City that attempted to connect improvising musicians across the U.S. LaDonna is editor-in-chief and publisher of The improvisor. She is a member of the Fresh-Dirt collective (Alabama Surrealism).

== Discography ==
- Raudelunas Pataphysical Revue - Ron Pate & the Debonairs, Say Day-Bew, 1975
- Trans - Davey Williams, LaDonna Smith, Theodore Bowen, Timothy Reed, Jim Hearon, Transmuseq Records, 1977
- Armed Forces Day - The Blue Denim Deals With the Arms, Say Day-Bew Records, 1978
- Folk Music - Davey Williams, Ted Bowen, Transmuseq Records, 1978
- 2000 Statues - Eugene Chadbourne, Parachute, 1978
- School - John Zorn, Eugene Chadbourne, Parachute, 1978
- Jewels - with Anne LeBaron, Davey Williams, 1979
- Velocity - with Andrea Centazzo, Davey Williams, Transmuseq, 1979
- Direct Waves - with Davey Williams, Transmuseq, 1980
- USA Tour - with Andrea Centazzo, Davey Williams, Ictus, 1980
- Alchemical Rowdies - with Davey Williams, Pippin Barnett, Danny Finney, Paul Watson, Transmuseq, 1982
- White Earth Streak - with Davey Williams, Gunter Christmann, Torsten Müller (musician), Transmuseq, 1983
- Locales for Ecstasy - with Davey Williams, Cinnie Cole, Transmuseq, 1987
- Dix Improvisations - with Davey Williams, Victoriaville (Victo), 1989, compilation
- Earbook, Vol 3 - with Davey Williams, (Rastacan), 1991, compilation
- Eye of the Storm - Solo Violin & viola, Transmuseq, 1992
- Transmutating - with Davey Williams, Transmuseq, 1993
- A Confederacy of Dances Vol 2 - Live Recordings of the Roulette Series (Einstein, 1994)
- Dice (She Says) - Elise Kermani compilation (Ishtar Records), 1994
- Harbinger - with Barbie Williamson, Album Cover Photography Melissa Springer, (Coyoteway Productions), 1994
- Dice 2 (She Says) - Elise Kermani compilation (Ishtar Records), 1996
- Birmingham Improv Festival Recordings - compilation (Transmuseq), 1996
- The Parachute Years - John Zorn (Tzadik), 1997
- White Earth Streak - Christman, Muller, Smith, Williams 1981-83 (Unheard Music), 2000
- Rare Earth - solo, mixed-electronic viola & violin, Table of the Elements, 2004
- Yokel Yen - LaDonna Smithwith Misha Feigin, guitar & balalaika, Transmuseq, 2004
- Waters Ashore - LaDonna Smith, Misha Feigin, Dave Liebman, Jason Foureman (Transmuseq), 2006
- Ambient Visage - LaDonna Smith with Susan Alcorn pedalsteel guitar, Transmuseq, 2006
- Floating Bridges - LaDonna Smith with Misha Feigin, guitar, Transmuseq, 2008
- Deviant Shakti - LaDonna Smith with Michael Evans, percussion, Transmuseq, 2009
- Time Delayed Free Improvisations - LaDonna Smith, David Sait, Glen Hall, Gino Robair (aPPRISe), 2009
- Postage Paid Duets - Vol. 2 - David Sait w/Glen Hall w/Gino Robair w/LaDonna Smith. Apprise AP-03, 2009, CD
- The Laycock Duos - Christian Asplund, LaDonna Smith, Stuart Dempster, Malcolm Goldstein, (Comprovise) 2009
- Fresh Dirt - LaDonna Smith, Davey Williams, Johnny Williams, Janice Hathaway (fresh-dirt.us) 2018
- Sequana Sessions - Davey Williams & LaDonna Smith, (Transmuseq) 2015
- Rising Tulips - LaDonna Smith, solo 5 string electric, (Transmuseq) 2019
- Channeling the Gatehouse, LaDonna Smith & Leland Davis (TransMuseq) 2020
