= Frederick Bianchi =

American composer

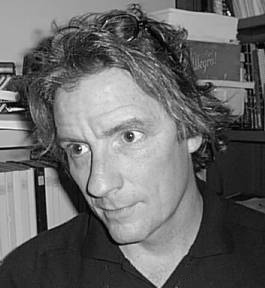
Dr. Frederick Bianchi

Frederick Bianchi is an American-born composer and music technologist (born 1954). Central to his work is the integration of acoustic instruments with electronic/computer-generated sound. He has been the recipient of numerous awards, honors, and citations including the ASCAP Young Composers Award, the Russolo-Pratella International Electronic Music Competition in Italy, the Bourges International Computer Music competition in France, the Kennedy Center's Friedheim Award competition in orchestral composition, the National Orchestral Association's Orchestral Fellow Award in New York City, and the United States Institute for Theatre Technology 'Award for Innovation'.

In 1988, Bianchi began developing interactive computer music systems and Virtual Orchestra technology with research partner David B. Smith. They were the first to introduce the term Virtual Orchestra into the musical lexicon in the early 1990s. The Kentucky Opera’s use of the Virtual Orchestra in the 1995 production of Hansel and Gretel marks the first use of virtual orchestra technology by a major performing arts organization. Controversy has surrounded Bianchi’s work and research which has prompted international debate regarding the future of music performance and technology. The Broadway musicians strike of 2003 resulted in the attempted banning of the technology and the blacklisting of the Bianchi & Smith partnership by the New York Musician’s Union. In 2004, the British Musician’s Union threatened to strike over the use of Virtual Orchestra technology in the remount of Les Misérables at the Queen’s Theater in London’s West End. The walkout was eventually thwarted when the Musician’s Union conceded that it could not prevent producer Sir Cameron Mackintosh from using the technology.

In 1998, Bianchi co-founded RealTime Music Solutions in New York City. Bianchi’s Virtual Orchestra work includes over 300,000 performances worldwide and collaborations with Lucent Technologies and Cirque du Soleil. He has been on the faculty of the College-Conservatory of Music at the University of Cincinnati, Boston University, and is currently Professor of Music at the Worcester Polytechnic Institute in Massachusetts.
