= Del Courtney =

American bandleader and occasional actor

Del Courtney (1910–2006) was an American bandleader and occasional actor. His band played at San Francisco Giants games in the early days of Candlestick Park, and at Oakland Raiders games in the 1960s and 1970s.

== Background ==
Earning the nickname "Old Smoothie" for the smooth dance tunes he and his band would play, he had a career that lasted over seven decades.

Born in 1910, Courtney was originally from Oakland, California. At the age of 9, he started playing piano. He attended the University of California, Berkeley, and while there he earned two degrees. One was a master's degree in music and the other a teacher's degree. Instead of teaching, the career path he chose was that of a professional musician.

== Career ==
=== 1930s ===
Having graduated from university, and having formed his first band at the Claremont Hotel, he became immensely popular in the Bay Area. He was also getting record deals and contracts for radio shows. During the mid-1930s, he toured Seattle and playing the ballrooms and hotels there. It wasn't the most commercial of ventures so he returned to California. There he recorded regularly and played to full venues.

=== 1940s to 1950s ===
In the mid-1940s, he was playing at the Blackhawk Restaurant, a popular venue where he was a top-line favorite. In early 1948, Courtney was playing his sixth engagement at the Rose Room at the Palace Hotel in San Francisco. At that time, his band consisted of trumpet players, George Rank, Seymour Solk, and Billy Petri. Trombone players were Rick Meyer and Johnny Strong. Saxophonists were Doug Lowery, Rick Sanders, Johnny Shepherd and Ken MacCoulou. The rhythm section consisted of Bob Moonan on Piano, Val Eddy on bass, Mel Severs on guitar, and Ellis Stickey on drums. The vocalists were Gloria Foster and Gil Vester. Lee Zhhito gave him a favorable review in the February 7 issue of The Billboard magazine.

In October 1958, his album Dancing 'Til Daybreak LP, which was released on Capitol Records, received a favorable review in Billboard. It contained four songs and four medleys.

=== 1960s ===
In the 1960s he had a daily radio show which aired over KSFO from the Tonga Room of the Fairmont Hotel.

On July 3, 1964, both Courtney and Les Malloy became the owners of radio station KSAN. Courtney was also musical director of The Oakland Raiders.

=== 1990s-2000s ===
In the mid-1990s, Courtney occasionally came out of retirement to front a big band. This was in response to what has been referred to as the "Swing revival". Courtney performed often at the Blue Tropix Restaurant and Night Club and the Elks Club in Honolulu. His September 2, 2001 Blue Tropix performance was notable for who was dancing in the audience: surviving Lindy Hop originators Frankie Manning and Norma Miller after they gave a Lindy Hop workshop at the University of Hawaiʻi.

At the age of 93 but not in the best of health, Courtney was playing once a month.

== Death ==
After a bout pneumonia that he had for a week, he died at Queen’s Medical Center in Honolulu aged 95 in February 2006.

== Television and Film roles ==
From December 1949 through 1956, Courtney hosted television interview shows on stations KGO-TV and KPIX. He also had a part in the 1959 film The Hideous Sun Demon. In the Robert Clarke directed sci-fi, he played the role of a radio DJ.
