= Davey Williams (musician) =

American musician (1952–2019)

Davey J. Williams (1952, York, Alabama – April 5, 2019) was an American free improvisation and avant-garde music guitarist. In addition to his solo work, he was noted for his membership in Curlew and his collaborations with LaDonna Smith.

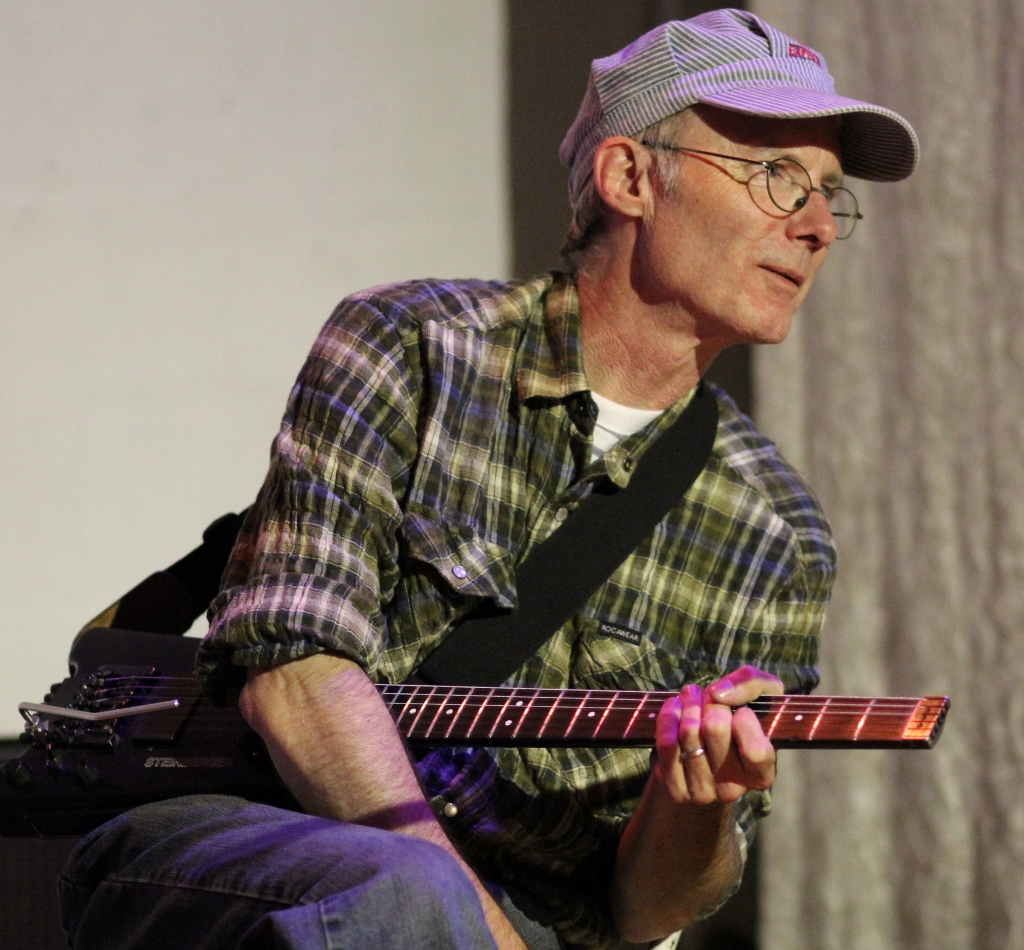
Davey Williams

== Biography ==
Williams began playing guitar when he was 12. He played in rock bands in high school, and studied with blues musician Johnny Shines from the late 1960s until 1971. In the early 1970s Williams played in the University of Alabama B Jazz Ensemble and the Salt & Pepper Soul Band. He also started working with LaDonna Smith around this time, and founded a musical ensemble and recording project called Transmuseq. He toured the U.S. and Europe in 1978. In the early 1980s he worked in a blues band called Trains in Trouble. In 1986 Williams joined Curlew, who released several albums on Cuneiform Records in the 1990s.

In the 1980s he also worked with Col. Bruce Hampton and OK, Nurse, and in the early 1990s played in a punk rock band called Fuzzy Sons. Williams played in an improvisational three-piece called Say What?, and worked with Jim Staley and Ikue Mori. Williams appeared live at some 1,500 concerts worldwide.

Williams co-founded The Improviser, a journal of experimental music, in 1981. He also worked as a music critic for the Birmingham News and published freelance criticism elsewhere.

Williams died in Birmingham, Alabama on April 5, 2019, from cancer.

== Discography ==
- Trans with LaDonna Smith, Theodore Bowen, Timothy Reed, Jim Hearon, [TransMuseq] 1977
- Raudelunas Pataphysical Revue [Say Day Bew] 1979
- Folk Music, LaDonna Smith, Ted Bowen, [TransMuseq] 1978
- Jewels with Anne LeBaron, LaDonna Smith, [TransMuseq] 1979
- Two Thousand Statues [John Zorn] -The English Channel [Eugene Chadbourne] 1977-1978
- School [John Zorn] with LaDonna Smith, Eugene Chadbourne [Parachute] 1979
- Velocities with LaDonna Smith, Andrea Centazzo, 1979
- Direct Waves with LaDonna Smith, 1980
- USA Tour with Andrea Centazzo, LaDonna Smith, [Ictus] 1980
- Ham Days with Udo Bergner, Herbert Janssen, Torsten Muller, LaDonna Smith [Fremuco Records] 1981
- Alchemical Rowdies with LaDonna Smith. Pippin Barnett, Danny Finney, Paul Watson, [TransMuseq] 1982
- White Earth Streak with LaDonna Smith, Gunter Christmann,Torsten Müller (musician) [TransMuseq] 1983
- Song of Aeropteryx, with LaDonna Smith, Hal Rammel, [TransMuseq]1983
- Criminal Pursuits, solo guitar improvisations [TransMuseq] 1985
- Locales for Ecstasy with LaDonna Smith, Cinnie Cole, [TransMuseq] 1987
- Dix Improvisations with LaDonna Smith, [Victo 1989]
- Travellers with LaDonna Smith [TransMuseq] 1990
- the Aerial #2, with LaDonna Smith [Non Sequitor] 1990
- Say What! with Steve Noble, Oren Marshall, 1992
- Slide Crazy [Sky Ranch 1992]
- Transmutating with LaDonna Smith, [TransMuseq] 1993
- A Confederacy of Dances, with LaDonna Smith [Einstein Records] 1994
- Northern Dancer with Jim Staley, Ikue Mori, 1996
- Tarot or Aorta memories of a PRE festival with LaDonna Smith [smackshire] 1996
- I Scream [goldplo-limited edition-atlanta] 1997
- Charmed, I'm Sure [Ecstatic Peace] 1997
- Carbon [Table of the Elements] 1997
- Texas Was Delicious (Megalon Records, 2000)
- Humdinger [Atavistic Records] 2001
- Numb Right [Megalon] 2002
- Antenna Road [TransMuseq] 2008
- Cooking With Dynamite! - Hawk Tubley & The Airtight Chiefs 2011
- Halcyon Days with Andrea Centazzo, LaDonna Smith [Ictus] 2011
- Sequana Sessions with LaDonna Smith [TransMuseq] 2015
- Fresh Dirt Submergence! Sympatica [Fresh Dirt] 2016
- More Requia, In Memory of Great Ancestors Henry Kaiser [Metalanguage] 2020
