= Bülent Arel =

Turkish composer (1919–1990)

Bülent Arel (23 April 1919 – 24 November 1990) was a Turkish-born composer of contemporary classical music and electronic music.

He was born in Istanbul, and studied composition at the Ankara Conservatory and sound engineering in Paris. He later taught at the Ankara Conservatory, established the Helikon Society of Contemporary Arts, and served as the first music director of Radio Ankara from 1951 to 1959. He was also a painter and sculptor, and several of his works are in the permanent collection of the Turkish National Gallery.

In 1959, the Rockefeller Foundation invited him to work at the Columbia-Princeton Electronic Music Center. There he composed and recorded two of his best-known works, "Stereo Electronic Music No.1" and "Stereo Electronic Music No.2" In 1962, he worked with Edgard Varèse on the electronic sections of Varèse's Déserts.

He also designed and installed the electronic music laboratory at Yale University, where he taught from 1961 to 1970, and he established the electronic music program at the State University of New York at Stony Brook, where he taught from 1971 until his retirement in 1989. Besides electronic works, Mr. Arel wrote chamber music, vocal works, and symphonic pieces, including a series of works commissioned by the Mimi Garrard Dance Theater.

In the course of his work, he invented the 'splicing tape dispenser', as well as other devices for tape handling. He was a pioneer of looping techniques.

His notable students include Daria Semegen, Conrad Cummings, Jing Jing Luo, Joël-François Durand, John Tabacco and Frederick Bianchi. See: List of music students by teacher: A to B#Bülent Arel.

In later life Arel lived in East Setauket, New York. He died of multiple myeloma in neighboring Stony Brook.
