= Bruce Golden =

American novelist

- Born: Bruce Edward Golden; December 3, 1962 (age 63); San Diego, California, U.S.
- Education: San Diego State University (BA)
- Occupations: Writer; satirist; journalist
- Children: 1
- Writing career
- Genres: Science fiction; speculative fiction
- Website: goldentales.tripod.com

Bruce Edward Golden (born December 3, 1962) is an American science fiction writer, satirist, and journalist. A lifelong resident of San Diego, California, he has published six novels and two collections of short-form speculative fiction.

== Background ==
Golden was born in San Diego in 1962 and graduated from San Diego State University (SDSU) with a Bachelor of Arts degree in English/Creative Writing. He taught a course in magazine article writing at SDSU.

== Writing career ==
Golden began his professional writing career as a freelance journalist, publishing more than 200 magazine and newspaper articles from in-depth profiles to feature stories to satirical commentary. His first sale as a writer was a story on Black's Beach, at the time the only legal nude beach in the country, which was published by The Progressive in 1977. He worked for 14 years as an editor, and was the founding editor/art director for five different publications.

In 1985 he was chosen to be the head writer and associate producer of a comedy/variety show (San Diego's Passion) involving more than 100 actors, writers, musicians, and dancers. In 1986 he wrote a teleplay that was optioned for Steven Spielberg’s Amazing Stories. However, the program was cancelled before the script could be produced, so Golden rewrote it as the short story "Common Time", which became a semi-finalist in L. Ron Hubbard’s Writers of the Future contest. An augmented version of the story was published many years later in the U.S. magazine Brutarian, as well as publications in Romania, Greece, Canada, and England.

Golden turned to broadcasting in 1990. As a television news producer and radio reporter, he was awarded an Emmy, two Golden Mikes, and a number of honors from the Society of Professional Journalists, including recognition for his radio documentaries Sex in the '90s and Banned in the USA. He returned to comedy writing to create Radio Free Comedy, a program mocking political correctness. Much later he wrote and produced two public health educational documentaries for the state of California.

In 2001, Golden left his journalistic career to focus on writing fiction. His first novel, Mortals All (Shaman Press), was a futuristic examination of the civil rights of artificially-created humans. A review in Asimov's Science Fiction Magazine described it as "Steeped in the ambience of classic 1950's Galaxy magazine ... social satire, irreverent anti-establishmentarianism, and pseudo-hardboiled narration ... Golden writes with zest and good pacing ... a certain flippancy of characterization and delivery."

Golden's second novel, Better Than Chocolate (Zumaya Otherworlds), was a futuristic mystery with undertones of satire and social commentary. It follows San Francisco Police Inspector Noah Dane, who, while hunting his partner's killer and investigating a pair of seemingly unrelated murders, uncovers a conspiracy that threatens all humanity. A review in Asimov’s Science Fiction says that, "If Mickey Spillane had collaborated with both Frederik Pohl and Philip K. Dick, he might have produced Bruce Golden’s Better Than Chocolate."

Golden's third novel, Evergreen (Zumaya Otherworlds), is set on a fictional planet populated by majestic forests, ever-changing auroras, and the ursu, a primate-like species that may have once achieved sentience. A review in SFFWorld.com mentioned "believably tormented characters, unique world-building, realistic dialogue, adventure, exploration, alien lifeforms...".

In addition to his novels, Golden has sold more than 100 short stories, published across nine countries in publications including Pedestal, Oceans of the Mind, Odyssey, Digital Science Fiction, Postscripts, Penumbra, and Nemonymous. His stories have appeared in more than a dozen anthologies, and he won Speculative Fiction Reader's "2003 Firebrand Fiction Award", the 2006 "JJM Fiction Prize", and was a co-winner of the 2003 "Top International Horror" story contest. He has received several Honorable Mentions from the Speculative Literature Foundation and the Writers of the Future Contest.

In 2011, he published Dancing with the Velvet Lizard (Zumaya Otherworlds), a collection of 33 works of speculative fiction.

== Bibliography ==
=== Novels ===
- Mortals All (2002)
- Better Than Chocolate (2007)
- Evergreen (2009)
- Red Sky, Blue Moon (2013)

=== Collections ===
- Dancing with the Velvet Lizard (2011)

=== Appearances in anthologies ===
- Stories of Myth, Legend and Future (2003)
- Nemonymous (England—2004)
- Top International Horror (England—2004)
- F/SF (2005)
- Book of Shadows (Australia—2006)
- North of Infinity II (Canada—2006)
- Love and Sacrifice (England—2007)
- Neverlands & Otherwheres (2009)
- Scary Kisses (Australia—2010)
- War of the Worlds (Canada—2010)
- Warrior Wisewoman 3 (2010)
- Ninety Minutes to Live (2011)
- Therefore I Am (Canada—2011)
- Moon: The Eighth Continent (2012)
- Future Imperfect (2012)

== Awards and accolades ==
- 1983 Elan Award "Marketing"
- 1987 Elan Award "Publication"
- 1988 Writers of the Future Honorable Mention
- 1992 Golden Mike "Team Reporting"
- 1993 Society of Professional Journalists "Best Editorials-Radio"
- 1993 Voice of America Honorable Mention "Americana"
- 1997 Golden Mike "One Hour Newscast-TV"
- 1998 Emmy "One Hour Newscast-TV"
- 2000 Writers of the Future Honorable Mention
- 2003 Top International Horror Co-Winner
- 2003 Firebrand Fiction Award Winner
- 2005 Speculative Literature Foundation Honorable Mention
- 2006 JJM Fiction Prize Winner
- 2007 Speculative Literature Foundation Honorable Mention
- 2009 Whispering Spirits Winner
- 2010 Phoenix Award Nominee
- 2011 National Space Society Honorable Mention
