= Daria Semegen =

American classical composer

Daria Semegen (born June 27, 1946) is a contemporary American composer of classical music. While she has composed pieces for traditional instruments – her Jeux des quatres (1970), for example, is scored for clarinet, trombone, cello, and piano – she is best known as a "respected electronic composer." She is a figure on the academic side of the electronic music genre, connected with the conservatory and the university (like her older contemporary Karlheinz Stockhausen), rather than the more popular expression of the genre that followed upon the widespread availability of synthesizers and personal computers in the 1970s and after. Her writing covers a range of topics related to musical composition and has been the subject of studies by other scholars.

== Biography ==
Born in Bamberg, West Germany of Ukrainian heritage, Semegen pursued an academic career in music, earning her MA from Yale University in 1971; she has studied at the Eastman School of Music and the Rochester Institute of Technology. She taught at the Columbia-Princeton Electronic Music Center (1971–75). She studied composition under Bülent Arel and Alexander Goehr, and in turn has taught other composers, including Joseph DiPonio, Daniel Koontz, Gilda Lyons and Philip Schuessler.

== Career ==
In a distinguished academic career in a field still heavily dominated by men, Semegen has received six grants from the National Endowment for the Arts; has been selected as a Fulbright fellow; and has been awarded fellowships at the MacDowell Colony, Tanglewood, the Chautauqua Institution, and Yaddo – among a range of other awards and distinctions. She is currently associate professor of composition, theory, and electronic music composition at Stony Brook University, and is director of its Electronic Music Studio.

Her best-known piece is probably Electronic Composition No. 1 (1971). Her work Arabesque premiered in 1992.
