= Lois Wann =

American oboist (1912–1999)

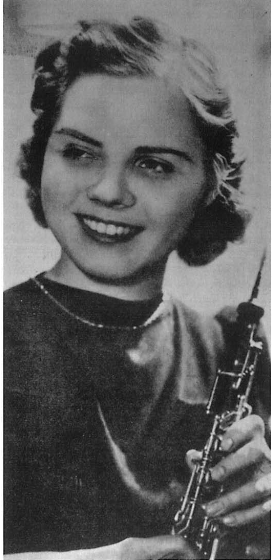
Lois Wann in 1940

Lois Wann (1912 – February 23, 1999) was an American oboist who was one of the well-known American oboists of the 20th century. She performed as a soloist in chamber music and concertos, specializing in early music but also playing contemporary works. Several contemporary composers wrote pieces for her, including Darius Milhaud. Reviews of Wann's concerts often highlighted her technique and musicianship. As an orchestral musician, she was an early example both of a woman who played the oboe in a professional American orchestra and of a woman principal in a professional orchestra. She spent much of her career in New York, where she was a noted teacher of the oboe, at the Juilliard School and elsewhere.

== Early life and education ==
Wann was born in 1912 in Monticello, Minnesota. The family moved to San Diego, where she was raised by her mother after her father's death. Wann learned the piano from the age of six, and later taught herself the oboe. After leaving school, she studied both instruments in Los Angeles for two years. In 1933, she moved to New York, where she attended the Juilliard School, graduating in 1936. She also attained higher degrees from Juilliard.

== Career ==
Before the Second World War in America, women instrumental players were discriminated against and were rarely able to play in mainstream orchestras. Wann's early orchestral work thus came in recently founded, segregated all-women orchestras: the Orchestrette Classique (from shortly after its foundation in 1932) and the New York Women's Symphony Orchestra (founded in 1934 by Antonia Brico). She performed as a soloist with both these orchestras, and as a guest soloist, in Handel's Oboe Concerto in G minor.

In the mid-1930s, Wann gained a position at the San Diego Symphony, becoming an early example of a woman principal in a professional orchestra. During a long performing career, she was also principal oboist of the Pittsburgh Symphony Orchestra, St. Louis Symphony Orchestra, New York City Ballet Orchestra, Chautauqua Symphony Orchestra and Les Concerts Symphoniques of Montreal, Canada. She also played in orchestras associated with the Aspen Music Festival (1951–57) and the Marlboro Music Festival. In 1953, she was described as among "New York's best freelancers", after performing in Handel's Ode for St Cecilia's Day with the Cantata Singers, conducted by Alfred Mann. In later life, she continued to play under a female conductor in the West Side Concert Series organized by Frédérique Petrides, the conductor of the Orchestrette Classique.

As a chamber musician, Wann performed with the Budapest and Juilliard string quartets, and also as a soloist with the New Friends of Music Chamber Orchestra, Bach Circle, Adolf Busch Chamber Players and the Four Seasons Ensemble. She was associated with performing early music, but also performed contemporary works. She premiered Alberto Ginastera's Duo for flute and oboe with Carleton Sprague Smith in 1947. Darius Milhaud wrote his Sonatina for Oboe and Piano for her, and she gave its first performance in 1954 or 1955. Another work composed for her was Sam Morgenstern's five-movement Combinations for oboe and strings. Her recordings include Mieczyslaw Kolinski's Dahomey Suite for Oboe and Piano, with the composer.

Wann was an oboe teacher in New York, teaching at the Juilliard School (1936–92), Mannes College of Music (1946–76), Vassar College, Manhattanville College, Henry Street Settlement and the United Nations International School. Notable pupils include the oboist Ronald Roseman (1933–2000).

== Reception ==
Several of Wann's solo and chamber performances were reviewed in the New York Times. A review of a 1939 performance of Handel's Oboe Concerto in G minor states that she "displayed her accustomed command of the instrument and knowing musicianship". A review of a predominantly Baroque program characterizes her as "certainly one of our most talented oboists", stating that she performed "often very difficult" solos with "fervor and self-effacing musicianship", and "unusually pure" notes in the high register, adding that played the fast sections "neatly and cleanly". A review of a concert including a Pergolesi concerto arranged for oboe mentions "her usual impeccable intonation, style and musicianship". The same reviewer describes her playing of a Mozart quartet as "skillful" with "grace and style". A later review by this reviewer of a recital including contemporary works comments that her playing, while always "careful and musical" was "seldom commanding enough to engage the attention in the manner of a major soloist".

== Personal life ==
In 1942 she married Aaron Bodenhorn, a cellist; they had two daughters. Wann died on February 23, 1999, in Bronxville, New York.
