= Women in Music (periodical) =

American newsletter founded in 1935

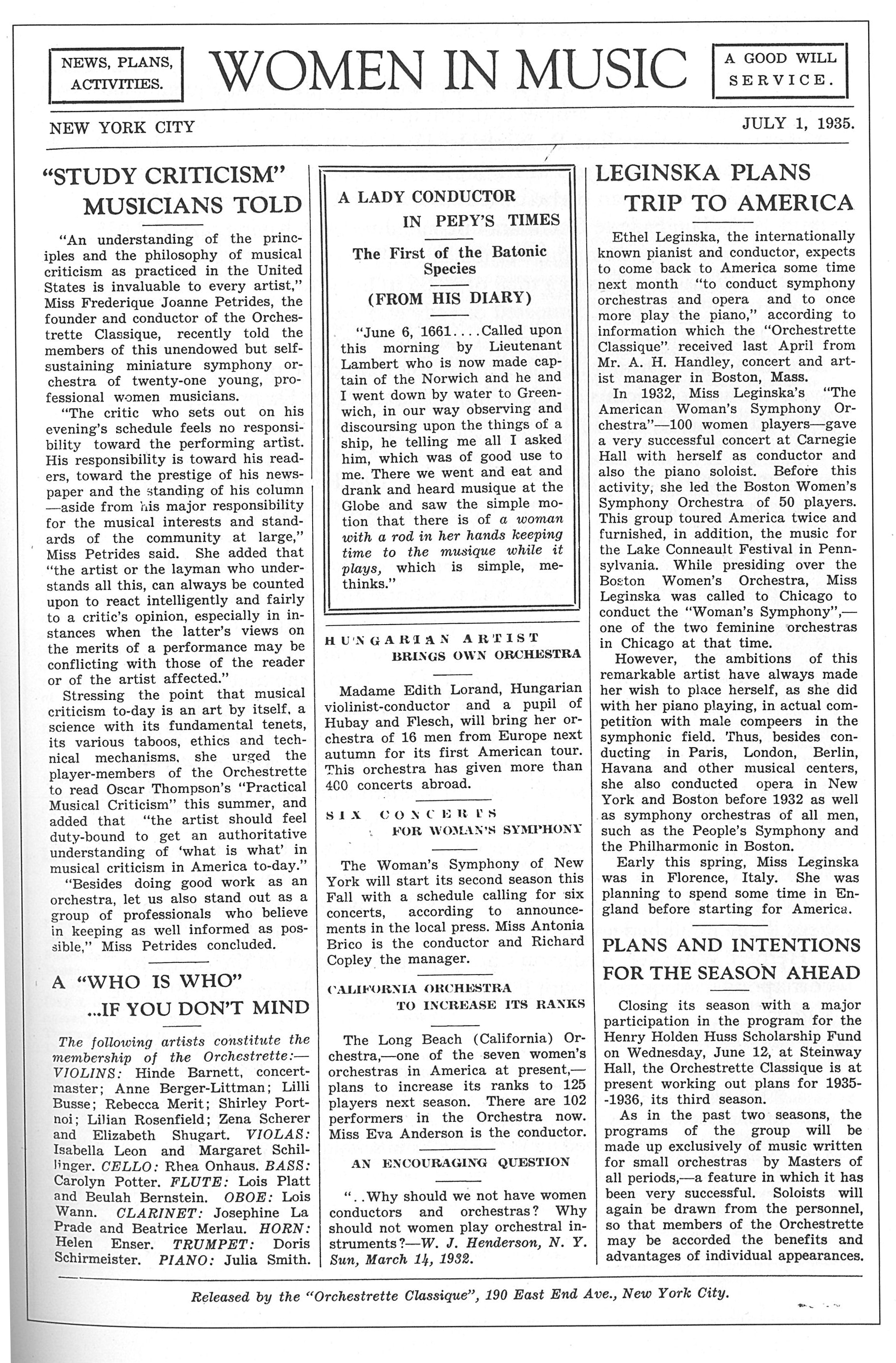
- Page 1, July 1, 1935 (first issue) courtesy of the New York Public Library for the Performing Arts, Music Division, and The University of Arkansas Press
- Managing editor: Frédérique Petrides
- Categories: Musicology, classical music, women's studies
- Founder: Frédérique Petrides
- Founded: 1 July 1935
- First issue: July 1, 1935
- Final issue: 1 December 1940
- Country: United States
- Based in: New York City
- Language: English
- OCLC: 15728633

Women in Music was an American newsletter founded in July 1935 by its publisher and editor, Frédérique Petrides, then the conductor of the Orchestrette Classique – an orchestra based in New York made-up of female musicians. The publication ran until December 1940. The thirty-seven extant issues were reprinted in the 1991 book by Jan Bell Groh, Evening the Score: Women in Music and the Legacy of Frédérique Petrides. The newsletter title Women in Music was coined in 1935 by Petrides's husband, journalist, Peter Petrides to encapsulate the gist of its contents.

== History ==
Women in Music was founded in the summer of 1935 for the purpose of enlightening the public with little-known historical facts and current developments pertaining to female conductors, composers, instrumentalists, singers and women-led orchestras. Its scope was not limited to contemporary musicians – it chronicled the activities of female musicians from Ancient Egyptian times to the then present.

The publication was sent free-of-charge to newspaper and magazine editors, libraries, music schools, institutions, and individuals in New York and elsewhere. The publication had a circulation of over 2,500.

Major print media, including music journals, general magazines, and newspapers have cited Women in Music as a primary source for opinions, facts, and quotes. Some of the newspapers include The New York Times; The New York Sun; New York World-Telegram; New York Daily News; New York Post; The Baltimore Sun; Chicago Tribune; San Diego Union; Los Angeles Times; Press-Telegram; The Philadelphia Inquirer, and publications that drew articles from Everybody's Weekly syndication.

"The Women in Music newsletters are the primary source for research done by musicologists on women in music." — Adrienne Fried Block, PhD (1921–2009), musicologist and choral director

== Extant issues ==
Published by “Orchestrette Classique,” 190 East End Ave., New York City

1. Volume I July 1, 1935
  Oscar Thompson, Rebecca Merit (Merritt), Hubay and Flesch, Ethel Leginska, Henry Holden Huss
2. Vol. I, No. 2 August 1935
  Fadettes, Caroline B. Nichols, Gertrud Hrdliczka, Eva Vale Anderson, Long Beach Woman's Symphony, Carmen Studer
3. Vol. I, No. 3 September 1935
  Thomas B. Aldrich, Gustave A. Kerker, Musical Mutual Protective Union of New York, Dr. Charles Burney, “Outline of a Prejudice”, Ebba Violette, Irene Sundstrom, Murielle and Portland Women's Symphony, Nikolai Sokoloff
4. Vol. I, No. 4 November 1935
  Women's String Orchestra, Camilla Urso, Lois Wann, Emma Steiner, Hans Kindler, Jeanette Evrard, Sandor Harmati, Woman's Symphony of Chicago (Chicago Woman's Symphony Orchestra), Arthur P. Schmidt, Eleanor Warner Everest Freer
5. Vol. I, No. 5 December 1935
  Luisa Tetrazini, Herliczka, Teresa Carreno, Henry T. Finck, Dame Ethel Smyth, Pauline Viardot-Garcia, Maud Powell, Jenny Lind
6. Vol. I, No. 6. February 1936
  Caroline B. Nichols, Julia Smith, Antonia Brico, New York Women's Symphony, Harley Hamilton, Woman's Orchestra of Los Angeles, D. Cesar Cianfoni
7. Vol. I, No. 7 March 1936
  Sir Henry Wood, Marie Wilson, New York Ladies Ensemble, Musicians’ Union, Atlantic Garden Orchestra, Women's Little Symphony of Cleveland
8. Vol. I, No. 8 May 1936
  Long Beach (group), Gertrud Herliczka
9. Vol. II, No. 1 July 1936
  Stokowski, Girl Scout, Long Beach Woman's Symphony, Eva Anderson, Pittsburgh Woman's Symphony, Lady Folkestone, Grace Burrows, British Women's Symphony Orchestra
10. Vol. II, No. 2 August 1936
  Bembo, Leopold Stokowski, Philadelphia Women's Symphony
11. Vol. II, No. 3 November 1936
  Elizabeth Kuyper, Billboard, Jeannette Scheerer, Gena Branscombe, Jane Evrard
12. Vol. II, No. 4 January 1937
  Vienna Ladies Orchestra, Phil Spitalny, Evelyn (Spitalny), Ethel Bartlett, Rae Robertson, William Durieux, Long Beach (group)
13. Vol. II, No. 5 February 1937
  Georges Enesco, Ellen Stone, Carmelita Ippolito, Frederick Huber
14. Vol. II, No. 6 March 1937
  Jose Iturbi
15. Vol. II, No. 7 April 1937
  Jose Iturbi, British Woman's Symphony Orchestra, Helen Enser, Carmen Studer Weingartner
16. Vol. II, No. 8 June 1937
  Olga Samaroff, National Federation of Music Clubs, Berlin Women's Orchestra, Elizabeth Kuyper, Mathilde Ernestine, Federal Music Project, Works Progress Administration (WPA)
17. Vol. III, No. 1 July 1937
  William J. Henderson, Caroline B. Nichols, Louis Elson, Ruth Kemper, Commonwealth Women's Orchestra of Boston (WPA), Nino Marcelli’s San Diego Symphony, Lela Hammer, Woods Symphony Orchestra, Lois Wann, Virginia Payton
18. Vol. III, No. 2 September 1937
  Albert Roussel, Ebba Sundstrom, Herliczka, The New Yorker, Virginia Short, Chicago Women's Concert Band, Lillian Poenisch
19. Vol. III, No. 3 October 15, 1937
  Anne (or Anna) Mehlig Falk, George Schaun
20. Vol. III, No. 4 December 1937
  Sidney Lanier, Otto Klemperer, Saint Louis Women's Orchestra, Edith Gordon
21. Vol. III, No. 5 January 1938
  Fabien Sevitzsky, Bertha Roth Walburn Clark, Erno Rapee
22. Vol. III, No. 6 February 1938
  Leona May Smith, Nadia Boulanger, Walter Damrosch
23. Vol. III, No. 7 April 1938
  Gertrude Herliczka, Lonny Epstein, Carl Friedberg, Grace Kleinhenn Thompson Edmister, Kirsten Flagstad
24. Vol. III, No. 8 June 1, 1938
  Leopold Stokowski, Hans Kindler, Sidney Lanier, Musicians Union - local 802, Committee for Recognition of Women in the Musical Profession, Musical America, Serge Koussevitzky, Frederick Huber, William J. Henderson
25. Vol. IV, No. 1 July 1938
  Ethel Leginska, Teresa Carreno, Gladys Weige, Woman's Symphony of Chicago, Fanny Arnston-Hassler, Woman's Concert Ensemble
26. Vol. IV, No. 2 September 1938
  Ruth Kemper, Howard Barlow
27. Vol. IV, No. 3 October 1938
  Pauline Juler
28. Vol. IV, No. 4 December 1938
  Nadia Boulanger, Lonny Epstein, Edgar Carver's all-girl band, John C. Freund, Marian Anderson, William J. King, The New York City Federation of Women's Clubs, Mrs. Otto Hahn, Julia Smith
29. Vol. IV, No. 5 January 1939
  Nadia Boulanger, Brico Symphony, Billboard, Eleven Debutantes, Henriette Weber
30. Vol. IV, No. 6 March 1939
  Asger Hamerik, Nadia Boulanger
31. Vol. IV, No. 7 April 15, 1939
  Alicia Hund, Amy Fay, Hetty Turnbull, Albert Stoessel, Louise Angelique Bertin, Paul Creston
32. Vol. V, No. 1 November 1939
  David Diamond
33. Vol. V, No. 2 December 1939
  Izler Solomon, Ruth Haroldson, Heidi Sundblad-Halme, Alexander Richter
34. Vol. V, No.3 February 1940
  Erika Morini, Amy Marcy (Cheney) Beach, Elsa Hilger, Deems Taylor, Sophie Hutchinson Drinker, Drinker Library of Choral Music
35. Vol. V, No. 4 April 1940
  World's Center for Women's Archives, Inc.
36. Vol. V, No. 5 September 1940
  Stokowski, All-American Youth Orchestra
37. Vol. VI, No. 1 December 1940
  Caroline B. Nichols, Orchestrette Classique, Women in Music

== Bibliography ==
=== References ===
- Jan Bell Groh (born 1936) (1991). Evening the Score: Women in Music and the Legacy of Frédérique Petrides. Fayetteville: University of Arkansas Press. ISBN 978-1-55728-218-7. OCLC 23693230.
- Frédérique Petrides Papers, Classmark JPB 83-3, Biography. New York Public Library for the Performing Arts. OCLC 35890194.
- Jane Weiner LePage (1983). Women Composers, Conductors, and Musicians of the twentieth Century, Volume II. Metuchen/London: Scarecrow Press. ISBN 978-0-8108-2082-1.
