= West Side Orchestral Concerts =

Former American summer classical concert series

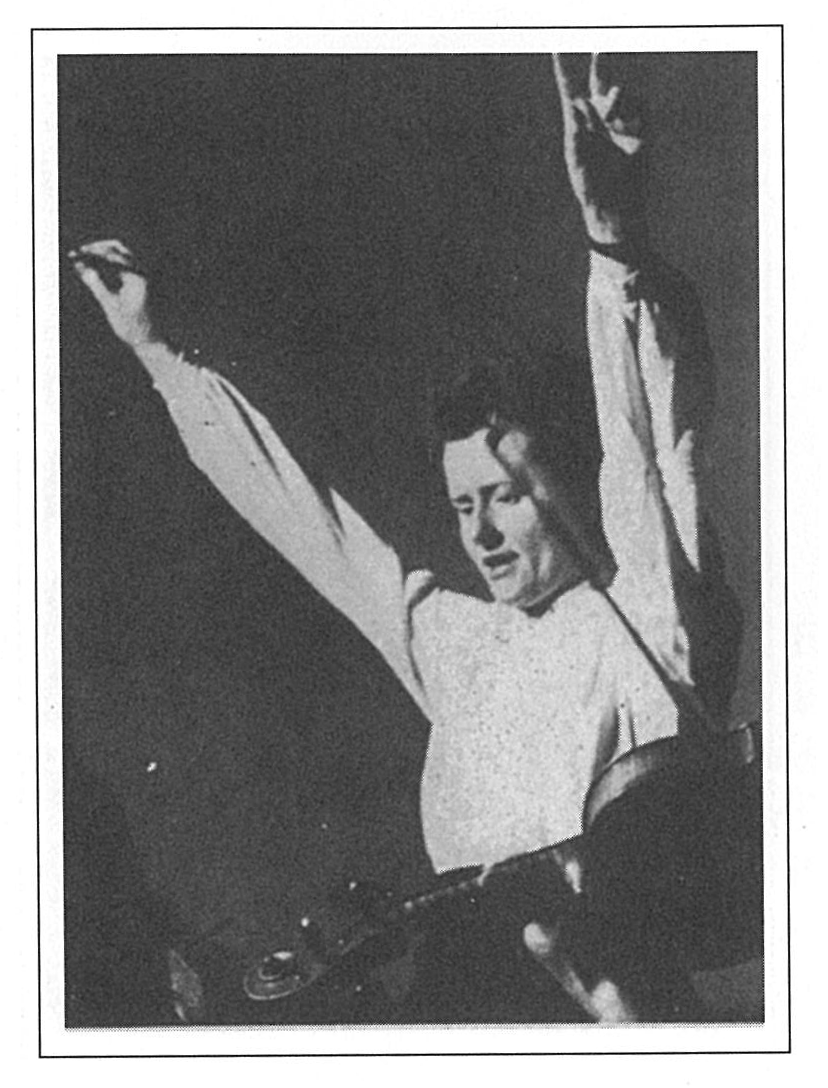
- Frédérique Petrides rehearsing her Festival Symphony Orchestra. Courtesy of the New York Public Library for the Performing Arts, Music Division, and the University of Arkansas Press
- Formation: 1962
- Dissolved: 1977
- Type: Outdoor summer classical concert series
- Headquarters: Upper West Side of Manhattan in New York City
- Location: Riverside Park (Manhattan)
- Region served: Upper West Side of Manhattan and citywide
- Official language: English
- Founder and conductor: Frédérique Petrides
- Main organ: West Side Community Concerts, Inc./West Side Orchestral Concerts, Inc.
- Affiliations: The New York City Department of Parks; the Recording Industries Trust Fund; Local 802 of the American Federation of Musicians

West Side Community Concerts, Inc., renamed West Side Orchestral Concerts, Inc. in 1968, was an American summer classical concert series given by a 40-piece orchestra, the Festival Symphony Orchestra. It was founded in 1962 by conductor Frédérique Petrides (1903–1983), who served as its organizer and musical director, and it continued until 1977. The first concert, in 1962, took place at 73rd Street in Riverside Park. In 1963 the series moved to its permanent location at 103rd Street in Riverside Park, Manhattan, New York, where a temporary acoustical shell was installed for the concerts. The series was publicized as "Tanglewood around the corner". Concerts drew audiences of as many as 4,500 and were broadcast live on WNYC radio.

== Founder and conductor, Frédérique Petrides ==
Before founding the West Side Community Concerts/West Side Orchestral Concerts, Frédérique Petrides had founded the Orchestrette Classique, an all-women's chamber orchestra that existed from 1933 to 1943. It premiered works by American composers including Paul Creston, Samuel Barber and David Diamond, and gave five to six concerts annually at Carnegie Chamber Music Hall, now Weill Recital Hall. Petrides also founded the Carl Schurz Park concert series on Manhattan's Upper East Side in 1958, the Hudson Valley Symphony Orchestra in Tarrytown, New York in the 1930s, and the Student Symphony Society in New York City in 1950. From 1935 to 1940 she edited and published the Women in Music newsletter, which circulated internationally.

Petrides directed two separate outdoor summer orchestra festivals, both in Manhattan neighborhoods where she lived. The first, begun in 1958, was in Carl Schurz Park on the Upper East Side, adjacent to East End Avenue, where she had lived from 1931 to 1958. The second, West Side Community Concerts, was launched in 1962 in Riverside Park on the Upper West Side, near West 78th Street, where she lived from 1958 to 1983.

== The Festival Symphony Orchestra ==
Petrides first organized and directed her Festival Symphony Orchestra for the Carl Schurz Park concerts, near Gracie Mansion. The orchestra was composed primarily of members of the New York Philharmonic, and it remained her orchestra during the West Side Community Concerts/West Side Orchestral Concerts series.

Petrides described her rehearsal approach: "It was necessary to be well-organized because there was only limited time to rehearse ... A woman must be better than a man if she is to conduct prestigious groups, and I made it my career always to be 100 percent prepared and to know all the scores tremendously well. I never encountered a problem conducting all-male orchestras, and we always worked well together."

== The organization ==
- The concerts were presented under the auspices of West Side Community Concerts, Inc., and later West Side Orchestral Concerts, Inc.
- The musicians were funded, in part, by a grant from the Recording Industries Trust Fund, obtained with assistance from Local 802 of the American Federation of Musicians.
- The New York City Department of Parks coordinated with the organization.
- Harry B. Frank (1905–1996) of the New York Supreme Court served as founding chairman. Gladys Steinholz (née Garf; 1901–1967) later served as chairman.

=== Peter Petrides, publicist and manager ===
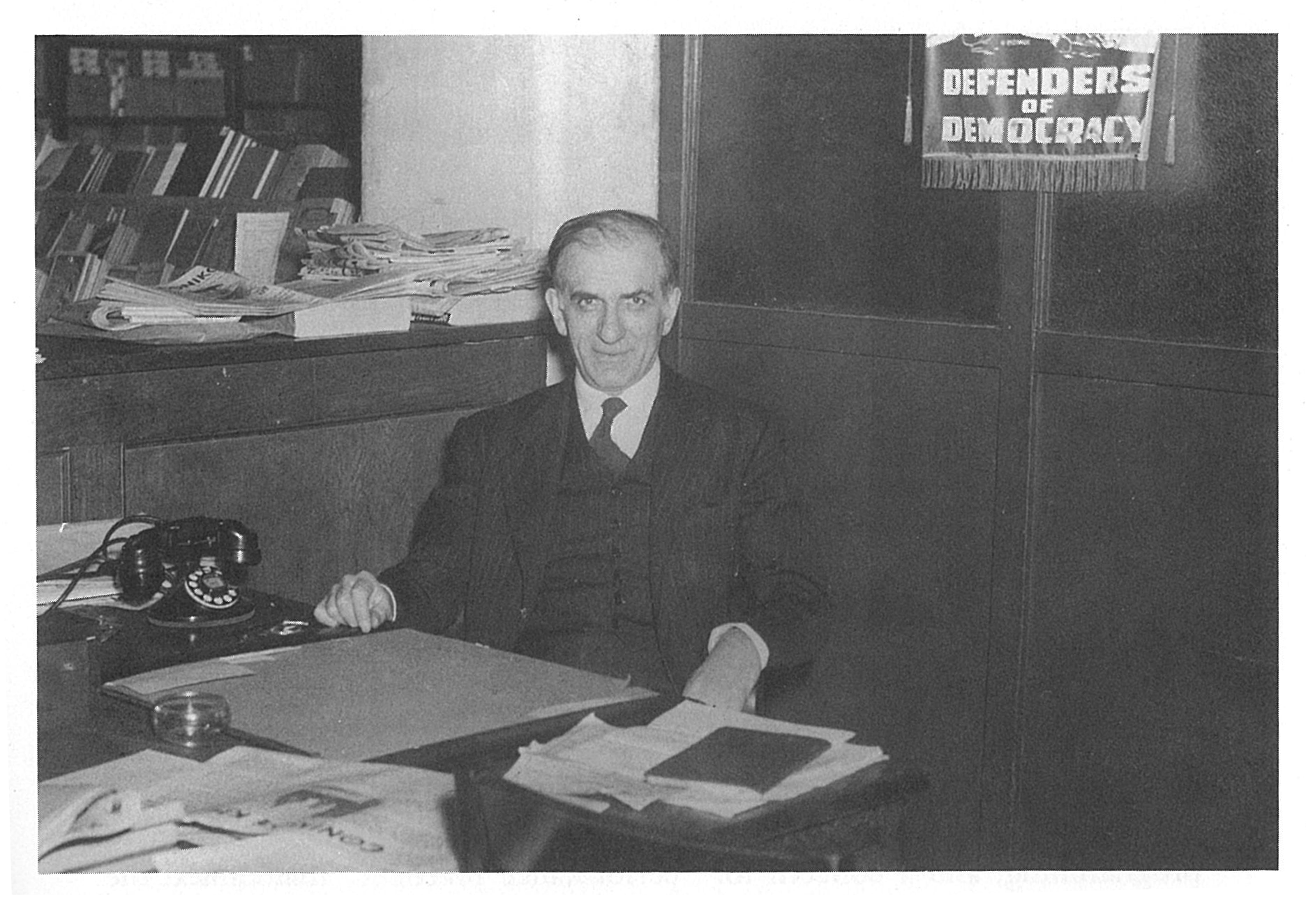
Peter Petrides in 1940

Petrides's husband, the journalist Peter Petrides (1896–1978), acted as manager and publicist for the concerts. He was born Petros Agathangelos Petrides into a Greek family in Caratepeh, Turkey, and grew up in Constantinople. After emigrating to the United States, he became a writer for and managing editor of the Greek-American newspaper The National Herald (not to be confused with the newspaper of the same name established in 1997).

== Programming ==
Petrides's programs combined little-known classical works with new music by American composers. She described her aim: "There was a wealth of music on library shelves and it had not been explored. There were works by classical composers that had never been performed in America. Modern works needed public performances, too ... I continually accomplished this goal by offering something different."

== Reception ==
Critics who reviewed the series over its fifteen-year existence included Francis D. Perkins of the New York Herald Tribune; Howard Klein, Theodore Strongin and Raymond Ericson of The New York Times; and Robert Sherman, also of The New York Times, who in the July 3, 1970 edition described Frédérique Petrides as "a prime mover in New York's cultural affairs since the mid-thirties".

== Notable concert in memoriam ==
On June 14, 1965, the Festival Symphony Orchestra with choir performed Haydn's Mass in Time of War in memory of Andrew Goodman, a resident of Manhattan's West Side who was killed in Neshoba County, Mississippi. About 2,000 people attended.
