= Brave Heroes of Bataan =

Song
- Published: 1943
- Genre: Military march
- Songwriter(s): Frank H. Grey

"Brave Heroes of Bataan" is a World War II march style song written for piano and published in 1943. Composed by Frank H. Grey, it was published by Theodore Presser Co. The lyrics refer to the Battle of Bataan.

The cover page shows four very apprehensive and gaunt-looking soldiers huddling in a foxhole.

The sheet music can be found at the Pritzker Military Museum & Library.
