= Frédérique Petrides =

Conductor and writer

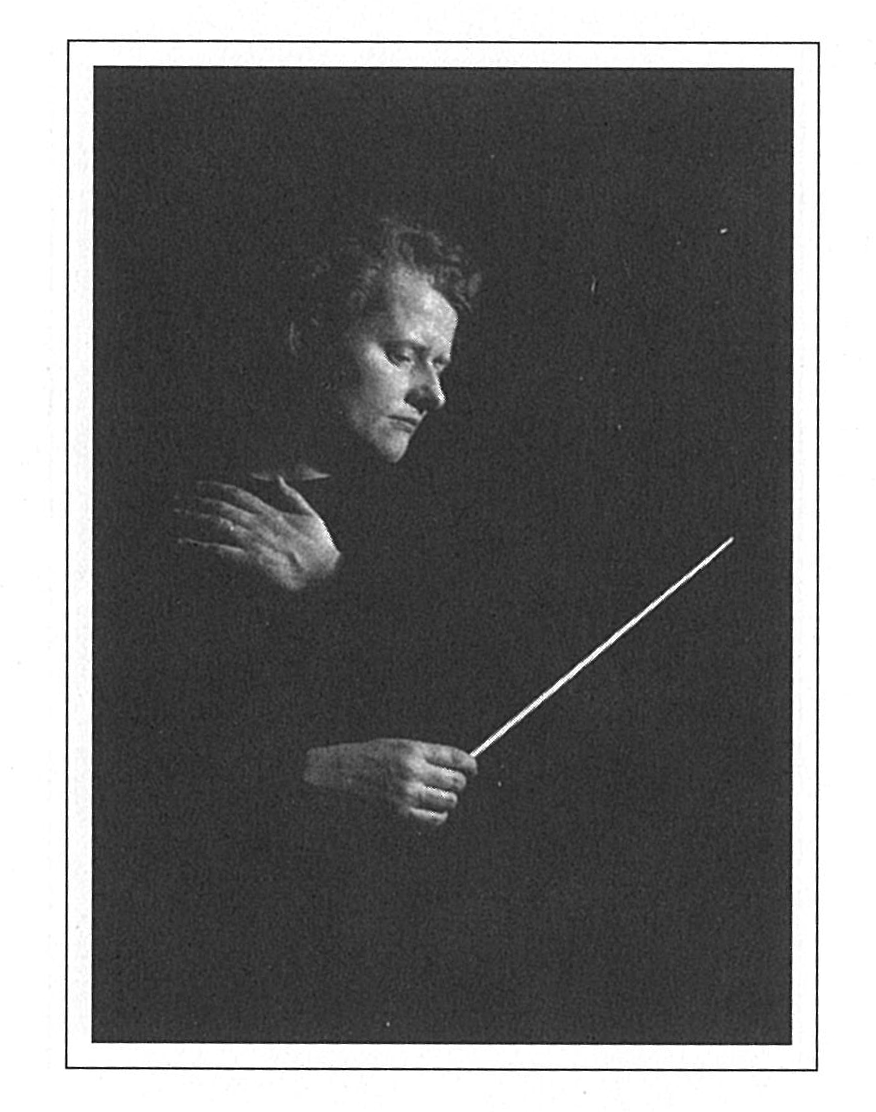
- Courtesy of the New York Public Library for the Performing Arts, Music Division, and The University of Arkansas Press
- Born: Frédérique Mayer; September 26, 1903; Antwerp, Belgium
- Died: January 12, 1983 (aged 79); Manhattan, New York
- Citizenship: United States
- Occupations: Orchestral conductor, editor and publisher, violinist
- Years active: 54
- Organization(s): Orchestrette Classique, West Side Orchestral Concerts
- Notable work: Editor and publisher of the Women in Music newsletter
- Spouse: Peter Petrides (1896-1978)
- Children: Avra Petrides, daughter (November 21, 1938-)
- Awards: National Federation of Musicians, 1979 Merit Award

Frédérique Petrides (pronounced peh TREE dis), (September 26, 1903 – January 12, 1983), was a Belgian-American conductor and violinist. In 1933, she founded and conducted the Orchestrette Classique in New York. It consisted of women musicians and premiered works by then relatively untried American composers, such as Paul Creston, Samuel Barber and David Diamond, that are now widely played and celebrated. She also edited and published the ground-breaking newsletter, Women in Music, which highlighted the activities of professional women musicians throughout the ages.

In addition, she founded several concert series in Manhattan, including the West Side Orchestral Concerts, the Student Symphony Society of New York, and the Carl Schurz Park concerts.

== A pioneer and advocate ==
In 1933, when Frédérique Petrides first presented her Orchestrette Classique, it was almost unheard of for a woman to be an orchestral conductor. And even at the close of her career, in 1977, not much had changed in that regard. Petrides was a pioneer, as one of the first woman conductors and "one-woman crusader" for the rights and advancement of women musicians in general, through her performances, articles and the dissemination, in the United States and internationally, of the Women in Music newsletters.

== Beginnings and influences ==
=== In Belgium ===
Frédérique Petrides was born Frédérique Jeanne Elisabeth Petronella Mayer, into a luxurious life in Antwerp, Belgium on September 26, 1903, which she later shared with two younger brothers, Jan and Gottfried. She was daughter to Joseph Heinrich Friedrich Mayer, a prominent industrialist and art collector, and Séraphine Sebrechts Mayer, a well-known pianist, composer and teacher at the Royal Conservatory of Brussels, who was also an accomplished painter and photographer.

Growing up, Frédérique ("Riki" to family and friends) and her siblings, had, according to her brother Jan's 1957 memoir, a very formal father, in manner and dress, old enough to be their "grandfather" and two "simultaneous mothers" : Séraphine, who attended to their artistic development, and her closest friend since childhood, Jeanne Françoise Schenck, whom they called Godel (Bavarian German for godmother). Godel lived with them and, assisted by their governess, Fraulein Klara, attended to the day-to-day matters. She was also responsible for their schooling, with the result that all three were given high scholastic marks when they eventually entered the German school on Antwerp's rue Grétry, considered one of the best private schools in the city. Jan Mayer wrote this about their father, mother and Godel, "...few people have been so fortunate in the choice of their early associates."

And many days were spent at The Kitchburg (German for Kitsch Castle), the family's country home in Capellenbosch, a suburb of Antwerp. There the children explored the grounds, played with the domesticated and wild animals, invented elaborate games of the imagination; and scouted for swarms of bees to add to their mother's bee hives.

Another aspect of Riki's upbringing, was the family's isolation. Her father had been born German, and his powerful and aristocratic family (his maternal grandparents were von Wittgensteins and his grandmother had been born a Schaafhausen) (Note: Genealogical family tree, and book on one of Heinrich Friedrich Mayer's von Wittgenstein forebears, which are part of the Frédérique Petrides Papers, Classmark JPB 83-3, Music Division of the New York Public Library for the Performing Arts) disapproved of his marriage to the Belgian musician, Séraphine Sebrechts, and except for his brother, August, ended all communications with him. Also later, with the advent of World War I, most of the Mayers' Belgian friends were no longer willing to be on good terms with an expatriate German, and turned their backs on him and his family.

All the while, Riki pursued her musical training. She studied violin as one of three private students accepted by Mathieu Crickboom, who played second violin in the famed Ysaye String Quartet; and she was taught theory and composition by her mother; Sebrechts had been "preparing to compete for the Belgium Prix de Rome in composition until dissuaded by her conventional parents. It was the waste of her mother's fine talent, Petrides believes, which motivated her to work for the advancement of women musicians, as she did in the 1930s and 40s".

=== In New York ===
In 1923, Riki emigrated to the United States where she enrolled in a conducting class at New York University, because an orchestra was available to her there on which she could practice. She also gave violin recitals, violin lessons, and coached string players.

Years later, from 1950 to 1956, at the invitation of a conductor whom she greatly admired, Dimitri Mitropoulos, she would attend his New York Philharmonic rehearsals, and confer with him, which strengthened her development as a conductor.

== The Orchestrette ==
In 1931, she married journalist, Peter Petrides, (Note: Agathangelos was the given name of Petros's father, as shown on the marriage certificate of Petros and Frédérique: Connecticut Department of Health, Bureau of Vital Statistics, Marriage License, September 5, 1931) who wholeheartedly supported her career, and encouraged her to found the Orchestrette Classique, in 1933, of which he became manager and publicist. The Orchestrette, an all-women chamber orchestra, gave five to six concerts annually in Carnegie Chamber Music Hall, now Weill Recital Hall. In 1942, the Orchestrette Classique was renamed the Orchestrette of New York.

Under Madame Petrides's direction, the programming was notable in combining performances of little-known works by the classical masters with premieres of pieces by then relatively unknown American composers like Samuel Barber and Paul Creston, and the British Ralph Vaughan Williams, that have since entered the musical canon.

From 1935 to 1940, with the help of her husband, Frédérique Petrides edited and published the Orchestrette's Women in Music newsletters; a unique series, it followed the activities of women musicians from ancient times to the then present.

=== Women musicians in demand ===
The Orchestrette of New York was made up of extraordinary women instrumentalists, and, because the Second World War's draft caused vacancies, they were suddenly offered positions in the major symphony orchestras. Petrides, not wanting to discourage her players' advancement, chose to let the Orchestrette come to an end, and its final performance was given in 1943.

== Activities ==
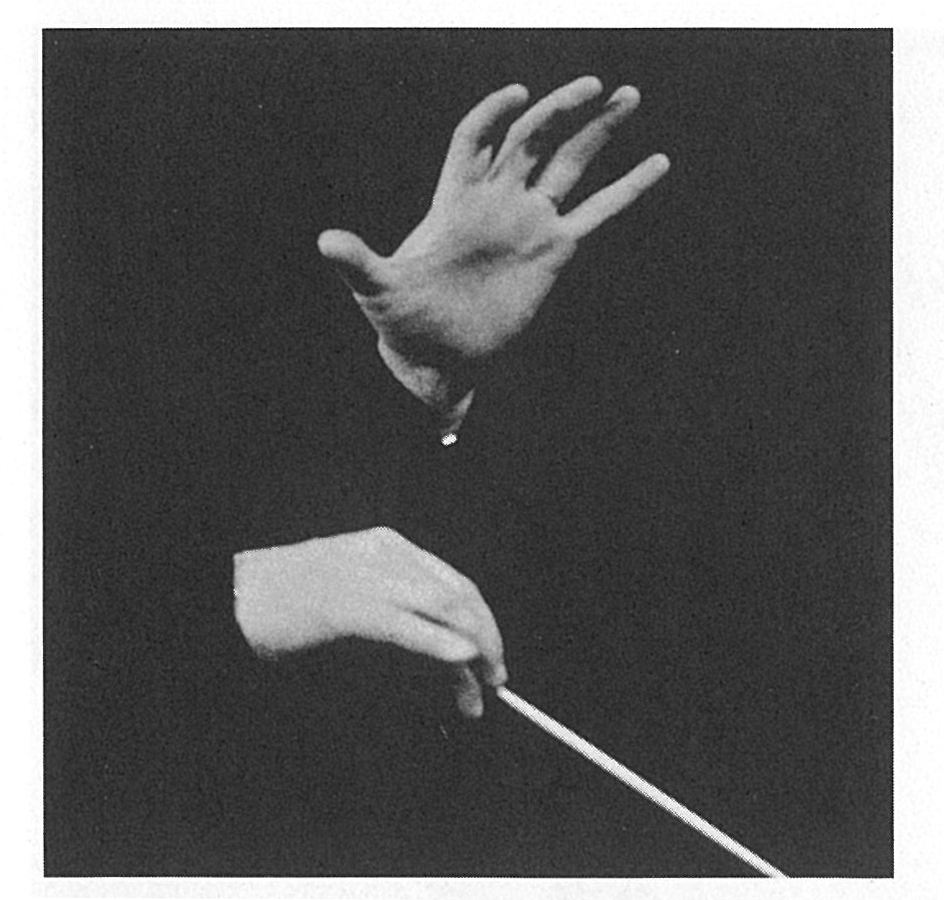

From then on, until the end of her career in 1977, Frédérique Petrides conducted mixed orchestras and continued to unearth not widely known compositions by classical composers, and to introduce works by American composers. In the 1930s, she had founded the Hudson Valley Symphony Orchestra in Tarrytown, New York, which she headed for seven years. Then, in 1956 and 1957, she conducted concerts in Washington Square Park; and in 1958, she founded the Carl Schurz Park concert series on Manhattan's Upper East Side, at which, for five years, she led her Festival Symphony Orchestra, composed primarily of members of the New York Philharmonic. In 1962, she founded the West Side Community Concerts (renamed West Side Orchestral Concerts in 1968) in Riverside Park, where she continued to lead her Festival Symphony Orchestra until 1977.

She also established the Student Symphony Society of New York City, which she conducted for eleven seasons, beginning in 1950, whose members, age nine to nineteen, were selected for their talent.

== Reviewers ==
Petrides's accomplishments were reviewed by leading critics and writers such as Virgil Thomson, H. Howard Taubman, Irving Kolodin, Olin Downes, Robert A. Simon, Jerome D. Bohm, Francis D. Perkins, Theodore Strongin, Raymond Ericson, Harold C. Schonberg and Robert Sherman who, in the New York Times of July 3, 1970, describes Petrides as "a prime mover in New York's cultural affairs since the mid-thirties".

== Legacy ==
Frédérique Petrides died in New York on January 12, 1983, at the age of 79. "She was one of the most influential champions of women in the profession of music in the twentieth century."

== Notes and references ==
Notes

Bibliography

Non-fiction books

- Groh, Jan Bell (1991), Evening the Score: Women in Music and the Legacy of Frédérique Petrides, Fayetteville, Arkansas: University of Arkansas Press, ISBN 978-1-55728-218-7

Articles and manuscripts

- Pool, Jeannie (Summer 1985). "The Women-In-Music Movement, Then and Now". ILWC Newsletter. International League of Women Composers. pp. 6–10.OCLC 777596449, 9399183, ISSN 0748-5735

- "Frederique Petrides, Leader In Women's Music Activities". New York Times. January 13, 1983. Accessed March 8, 2011.

Collections

- Art Institute of Chicago, Photography Collection, where Sebrechts photographs are housed.
- Frédérique Petrides Collection, Music Division, New York Public Library for the Performing Arts, Lincoln Center. Classmark: JPB 83-3. 10. Series in 25 boxes. processed by Tema Hecht. September 1996. Revised April 2008.
1. Mayer, Jan Christian Heinrich August (Petrides's brother) (1957). "Childhood Recollections". Series 5, folder 10.
2. Finding Aid, Series 4 Folder 17

Reference books

- Garraty, John Arthur, ed. (1999). "Petrides, Frédérique". American National Biography. Vol. 9. New York: Oxford University Press. OCLC 39182280.

- Hitchcock, H. Wiley; Sadie, Stanley, eds. (1986). "Petrides, Frédérique". The New Grove Dictionary of American Music. Vol. 3. London: Macmillan Publishers. ISBN 978-0-943818-36-8. OCLC 13184437.

- Ireland, Norma Olin (1988). "Petrides, Frédérique". Index to Women of the World from Ancient to Modern Times: A Supplement. Metuchen, New Jersey: Scarecrow Press. ISBN 978-0-8108-2092-0. OCLC 17301004.

- LePage, Jane Weiner (1983). "Frederique Petrides". Women Composers, Conductors and Musicians of the Twentieth Century. Vol. 2. Metuchen, New Jersey: Scarecrow Press. ISBN 978-0-8108-1597-1. OCLC 6087371.

- Morehead, Philip David; MacNeil, Anne (1991). "Petrides, Frédérique". The New American Dictionary of Music. New York: E. P. Dutton. ISBN 978-0-525-93345-8. OCLC 23694214.

- Neuls-Bates, Carol, ed. (1982). "Petrides, Frédérique". Women in Music: An Anthology of Source Readings from the Middle Ages to the Present (1st ed.). Harper & Row, Publishers. ISBN 978-0-06-014992-5. OCLC 8409196.

- Webb, Walter, ed. (1984). "Petrides, Frédérique". Biography Index: September 1982 – August 1984. Vol. 13. New York: H. W. Wilson Company. OCLC 31441138.
