= Women in music (disambiguation) =

Women in music refers to the role of women as composers, songwriters, instrumental performers, singers, conductors, music scholars, music educators, music critics/music journalists and other musical professions.

Women in music may also refer to:

- Women in Music (periodical), an American newsletter founded in July 1935
- Billboard Women in Music, an annual event held by Billboard
- International Alliance for Women in Music, an international membership organization of women and men
- Women in Music Pt. III, a 2020 album by HAIM
