= Louise E. Stairs =

American composer, organist, and pianist

Louise E. Simpson Stairs (March 24, 1892 - November 1975) was an American composer, organist, and pianist, who sometimes published under the pseudonym Sidney Forrest. She composed several cantatas, as well as piano and vocal works for children.

== Biography ==
Stairs was born in Troupsburg, New York, to Alice Clare Stephens and Colonel Ellsworth Simpson. She married Alpheus Wade Stairs on September 3, 1912, and they had a daughter (Ruth). Little is known about Stairs’ education.

== Career ==
Her music was published by Carl Fischer Music, Hall-Mack Co., Oliver Ditson, and Theodore Presser Co. Her compositions include:

=== Cantatas ===
- Choral Cantata
- Infant Holy: Christmas Cantata
- Light O’er Bethlehem: Christmas Cantata

=== Organ ===
- Advent Prayer
- Arietta
- Bright and Morning Star
- He Shall Be Their Shepherd
- Manger’s Gift
- Master Call
- Sabbath Morning
- White Lillies

=== Piano ===
- Clocks in the Hall (with E. B. Marks)
- Floating Clouds
- Peach Blooms
- Soldiers at Play
- Sunday Morning
- To Whit, To Whoo
- Uncle Ben

=== Vocal ===
- “His Loving Call”
- “Hush-a-bye Dolly”
- “Finding Fairies”
- “Lazy Frog”
- “Lift Up Your Heads”
- “Lord, Speak to Me” (text by Frances Ridley Havergal)
- “Nest of Baby Bunnies”
- “Robin Redbreast’s Song”
- “Robin’s Song”
- “Sailboats”
- “So Longeth My Soul for Thee”
- “There is an Eye that Never Sleeps”
- “When the Robin Sings”
- “Woodland Concert”
