= Matilee Loeb Evans =

American composer and musician (1879-1963)

Matilee Loeb Evans Preston
- Also known as: Matilee Loeb Evans, Matilee Loeb-Evans Preston, and M. L. Preston
- Born: Matilee Loeb; April 28, 1879; Toledo, Ohio
- Died: February 21, 1963 (aged 83)
- Occupations: Composer; cornetist
- Instrument: cornet
- Years active: 1891-1963

Matilee Loeb Evans Preston (April 28, 1879 – February 21, 1963) was an American composer and cornetist. She wrote music for piano and was a charter member of the Los Angeles Woman’s Orchestra. She published under the names Matilee Loeb Evans, Matilee Loeb-Evans Preston, and M. L. Preston.

Preston was born in Toledo, Ohio, but grew up in Los Angeles, California. Her earliest music teacher was her father, Leopold Loeb, who had studied at the Leipzig Conservatory. Her first solo performance on cornet was in 1891. She later played cornet with the Los Angeles Women’s Orchestra and studied organ with Frank Harvey Colby.

Preston married Evan G. Evans and they had three children. In 1917, she married J. Clarence Preston.

In 1919, Preston’s letter to Pacific Coast Musician was published: “To my mind it is certainly a great mistake for a girl to discontinue her musical studies after marriage. Home duties, of course, are many and various, especially where there are children in the family, but, by careful planning and conserving of time, a woman can devote some part of each day to the study of music.”

Preston’s compositions were published by Brehm Brothers, Koninsky Music Co., and Theodore Presser Company.

== Piano ==
- A Breath of Lavender: Romance
- Cricket
- Dance of the Bubbles (four hands)
- Dance of the Goblins
- Fairy Prince
- Forget Me Not
- Fragrant Violets Waltz
- Frolic of the Brownies
- Gay Johnny Jump-Up
- Gnomes’ Dress Parade
- Here Comes the Parade (four hands)
- In Sweet Accord
- Longing
- Queen of the Elves
- Old Rose Leaves
- On the Terrace
- Savannah Side Swing Rag Two Step
- Sweet Clover Waltz
- Thistledown
- With Colors Waving: March
- Yellow Butterflies Waltz
