= Allegiance: Patriotic Song =

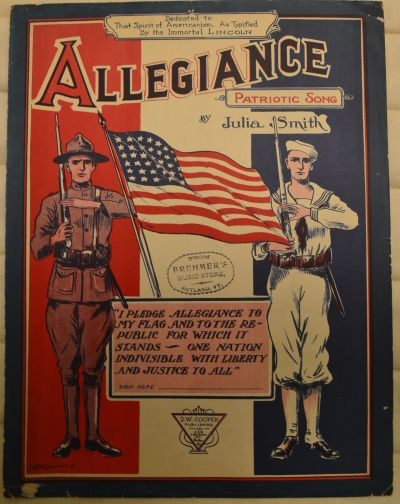
- Found at Pritzker Military Museum & Library

Song
- Language: English
- Released: 1918
- Songwriter(s): Julia Smith

"Allegiance: Patriotic Song" is a World War I song first copyrighted on March 14, 1918.

Julia Smith composed this song for voice and piano. It was published in Boston, Massachusetts by D.W. Cooper Music Co. The cover, illustrated by E. S. Fisher, features a caption which reads, "Dedicated to the spirit of Americanism as typified by the immortal Lincoln.”

== Bibliography ==
- Crew, Danny O. Presidential Sheet Music: An Illustrated Catalogue of Published Music Associated with the American Presidency and Those Who Sought the Office. Jefferson, N.C.: McFarland, 2001. ISBN 0786409282 OCLC 45313670
- Vogel, Frederick G. World War I Songs: A History and Dictionary of Popular American Patriotic Tunes, with Over 300 Complete Lyrics. Jefferson: McFarland & Company, Inc., 1995. ISBN 0-89950-952-5
