= Theodore Presser Company =

American music publishing and distribution company

- Parent company: Carl Fischer Music
- Founded: 1883
- Founder: Theodore Presser
- Country of origin: United States
- Headquarters location: Malvern, Pennsylvania
- Publication types: Sheet music
- Official website: www.presser.com

The Theodore Presser Company is an American music publishing and distribution company located in Malvern, Pennsylvania, formerly King of Prussia, Pennsylvania, and originally based in Bryn Mawr, Pennsylvania. It is the oldest continuing music publisher in the United States. It has been owned by Carl Fischer Music since 2004.

== History ==
=== Theodore Presser ===
Theodore Presser (1848-1925)

Theodore Presser was born July 3, 1848, in Pittsburgh, Pennsylvania, to German emigrant Christian Presser and Caroline Dietz. As a teenager, he worked in an iron foundry helping to mold cannon balls for the army during the Civil War. This activity proved too strenuous for his young physique and in 1864, at 16, he began selling tickets for the Strokosch Opera Company in Pittsburgh. At the same time, he began working as a clerk at C.C. Mellor's music store in Pittsburgh. He eventually rose to become sheet-music department manager.

Presser began his musical studies by learning to play the piano at age 19. The next year, he began studying music at Mt. Union College, where he stayed for a year, and then worked as a piano teacher at Ohio Northern University for two years. Further studies were completed at Miami Conservatory of Music, the New England Conservatory, and the Leipzig Conservatory in Germany under Reinecke, Jadassoh, and Zwintscher. His late start in learning to play the piano handicapped his technique.

He is credited as the founder of the Department of Music at Ohio Wesleyan University, where he taught 1876–1878. While there, he founded the Music Teachers National Association. His studies in Germany lasted from 1878 to 1880. He then became director of music at Hollins College in Roanoke, Virginia. In October 1883, while working at Hollins, he began publication of The Etude music magazine with only $250 in cash. The immediate success of his new magazine prompted him to seek larger publishing facilities in Philadelphia, Pennsylvania in 1884.

Presser died in Philadelphia on October 28, 1925. He married Helen Louise Curran (1890; d. 1905) and, subsequent to her death, Elise Houston (1908; d. 1922). He is interred at West Laurel Hill Cemetery in Bala Cynwyd, Pennsylvania.

=== The Presser Company ===
Presser's need for music content within The Etude resulted in his establishment as a dealer and publisher.

Following the purchase of the John Church Company in 1930, the Theodore Presser Company acquired the Oliver Ditson Company in 1931. Through this acquisition, Presser traces its origins to 1783, when Batelle's Book Store (later the Oliver Ditson Company), began a music-publishing business in Boston, Massachusetts.

In 1972, the Theodore Presser Company acquired Elkan-Vogel and its locally represented agencies (including Hamelle et cie., Henry Lemoine et cie., and others), making the Theodore Presser Company a major distributor of French music in the United States.

On August 31, 2004, Presser closed its retail music stores in both King of Prussia and Center City Philadelphia. The company now focuses primarily on publishing and distribution activities from its headquarters.

In 2017, Presser acquired Columbia Music Company, founded by Sophocles Papas. Other subsidiaries include Editions Orphée, Elkan-Vogel, Falls House Press, and Merion Music.

In addition to its own catalog, Presser represents the music of more than 70 U.S. and foreign publishers, including Universal Edition, Peermusic Classical, Éditions Alphonse Leduc, and Bärenreiter.

=== Presser Foundation ===
The publishing company that Presser founded was so successful that in 1906, Presser was able to express his appreciation to those who made this success possible by establishing the Presser Home for Retired Music Teachers located on West Johnson Street in the Mount Airy section of Philadelphia. His philanthropic zeal is continued to this day through his foresight in forming the Presser Foundation in 1916, nine years before his death. Each year, the Presser Foundation awards scholarships, grants, and funds specifically to further the cause of music and music education in America.

== Composers published by Theodore Presser ==
- Samuel Adler
- William Albright
- Martin Amlin
- Daniel Asia
- P.D.Q. Bach
- Julie Rivé-King
- Seymour Barab
- Irwin Bazelon
- Warren Benson
- Chester Biscardi
- William Bolcom
- Victoria Bond
- Louis Calabro
- Ronald Caltabiano
- Chen Yi
- Valerie Coleman
- Ruth Crawford
- Daniel Dorff
- John Downey
- Henri Dutilleux
- Donald Erb
- Matilee Loeb Evans
- Eric Ewazen
- David Felder
- Carlos Gardels
- Nikka Gershman
- Ricky Ian Gordon
- Adolphus Hailstork
- Iain Hamilton
- Donald Harris
- Michael Hersch
- Hobart Doane Hewitt
- Lejaren Hiller
- Katherine Hoover
- Huang Ruo
- Charles Ives
- Stephen Jaffe
- Robert Jager
- Martin Kennedy
- Earl Kim
- William Kraft
- Ezra Laderman
- Henri Lazarof
- David Leisner
- Gerald Levinson
- Peter Scott Lewis
- Lowell Liebermann
- Philip Maneval
- James Matheson
- William Mayer
- John Melby
- Robert Moevs
- Robert Muczynski
- Jeffrey Mumford
- Jeff Nichols
- Carter Pann
- Thomas Pasatieri
- George Perle
- Vincent Persichetti
- Edna Frida Pietsch
- Alice McElroy Procter
- Marta Ptaszynska
- Agnes Clune Quinlan
- Frances Marion Ralston
- Shulamit Ran
- Behzad Ranjbaran
- Jay Reise
- Violet Reiser
- Lois Rhea
- Irene Marschand Ritter
- Louise Robyn
- George Rochberg
- Bernard Rogers
- Gertrude Martin Rohrer
- Clara Ross
- Charlotte Ruegger
- Carl Ruggles
- Peter Schickele
- Gary Schocker
- William Schuman
- Amy Scurria
- Sophie Seipt
- Roger Sessions
- Ralph Shapey
- Louise Siddall
- Netty Simons
- Nellie Bangs Skelton
- Hale Smith
- Julia Frances Smith
- Louise Spizizen
- Louise E. Stairs
- Steven Stucky
- Robert Suderburg
- Francis Thorne
- George Tsontakis
- J. Lilian Vandevere
- Cecile Vashaw
- Marion Verhaalen
- Hazel Volkart
- Marion Vree
- Melinda Wagner
- Caroline Holme Walker
- David Ward-Steinman
- Mabel Madison Watson
- Alliene Brandon Webb
- Hugo Weisgall
- Dan Welcher
- Richard Wernick
- Roger Zare
- Ellen Taaffe Zwilich
- Narong Prangcharoen

== See also ==
- Music Publishers Association
