= Hempstead Historic District =

Historic district in Connecticut, United States

- U.S. National Register of Historic Places
- U.S. Historic district
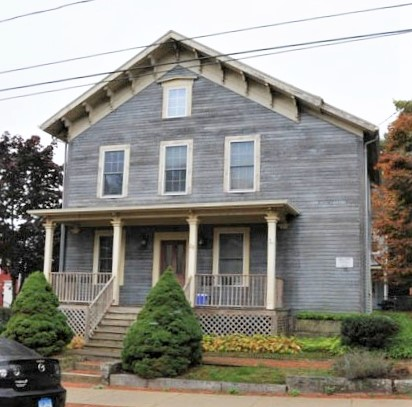

- Location within Connecticut Location within the United States
- Location: Roughly bounded by Franklin Street, Jay Street and Mountain Avenue, New London, Connecticut
- Coordinates: 41°21′13″N 72°6′13″W
- Area: 29 acres (12 ha)
- Architect: Bishop, David; Et al.
- Architectural style: Greek Revival, Italianate, Gothic Revival;Queen Anne
- NRHP reference No.: 86002112
- Added to NRHP: July 31, 1986

The Hempstead Historic District of New London, Connecticut encompasses a residential area north of the city's harbor and central business district, extending mainly along three roughly parallel streets: Franklin and Hempstead Streets, and Mountain Avenue. The area was settled in the 17th century, and has three centuries of architecture depicting an increasingly urban area. The district was listed on the National Register of Historic Places on July 31, 1986.

== Description and history ==
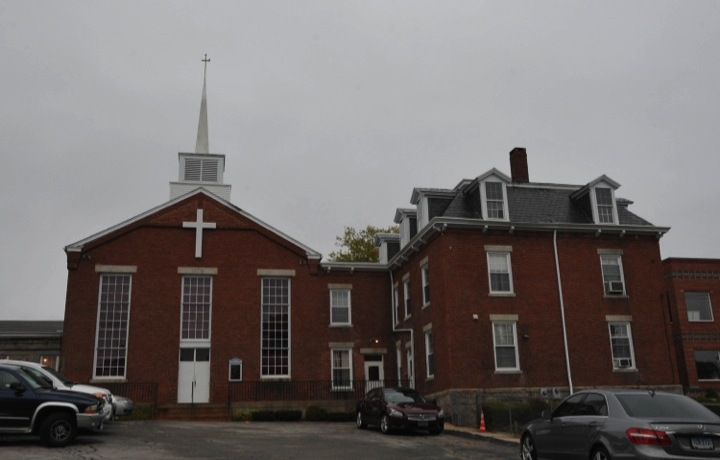
Shiloh Baptist Church

The Hempstead area was first settled in the 17th century, when Robert Hempstead and Nathaniel Holt established farms overlooking Bream Cove to the south. The Joshua Hempsted House at 11 Hempstead Street dates to 1678, and is one of the city's oldest buildings. Significant development did not begin until the 1840s, when the city's economy benefited from the whaling industry, and took place roughly over the next century. Later in the 19th century industrial activity also grew as an economic force, with light industry established in the Hempstead area, and the area became dominated by a significant free black population.

The district has three major north-south roads (Franklin and Hempstead Streets and Mountain Avenue) and four east-west streets (Hempstead, Garvin, Home, and Jay Streets). The terrain is that of a steeply sloping hillside, with retaining walls creating a terraced effect for many of the properties. It has 142 houses, most of which were built between about 1840 and 1920, and have retained their historical integrity. Notable non-residential structures include the 1845 Greek Revival New London County Jail (now the Shiloh Baptist Church), and the Renaissance Revival Saltonstall School, built in 1903. Both the Joshua Hempstead House and the Nathaniel Hempstead House (1759) are historic house museums open to the public.

== See also ==
- National Register of Historic Places listings in New London County, Connecticut
