= Cecile Vashaw =

American composer, conductor and music educator

Cecile L. Vashaw (23 August 1909 – 1 January 1985) was an American composer, conductor, and music educator who is best remembered today for her string method books and for founding and conducting the Toledo Youth Symphony.

Vashaw was born in Toledo, Ohio, to Benjamin Hezekiah and Edna M. Schnieder Vashaw. She graduated from the Toledo Conservatory of Music, then earned a master's degree at New York University.

Vashaw met composer Julia Frances Smith in New York and collaborated with her on several projects over the years. In 1965, they composed the tone poem Remember the Alamo for band, chorus, and narrator, which was commissioned by U.S. Navy Band director Lt. Cmdr. Anthony A. Mitchell. They also collaborated on Sails Aloft: Overture for Band, and on The Work and Play String Method, several volumes for violin, viola, cello, and bass. Their music was published by Theodore Presser Company.

Smith and Vashaw worked much of the time via telephone and the postal mail system, because Smith remained in New York, while Vashaw returned to Toledo, where she played violin and served as second concertmistress in the Toledo Symphony Orchestra. In 1939 she became the director of chorus, band, and orchestra at Waite High School and supervised the Toledo public school string program. She founded the Toledo Youth Symphony in 1950 and conducted it until 1965, when she became the director of music for the entire Toledo public school system. Vashaw participated in workshops on music education and wrote at least one article, Solving the String Study Problem in Toledo, Ohio, for Etude magazine. She influenced many generations of public school music students.
