= Anna Hempstead Branch =

American poet (1875–1937)

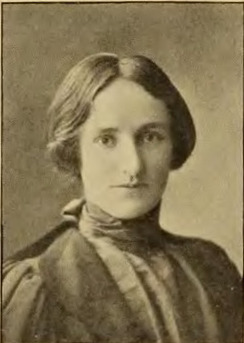
- Born: March 18, 1875; Hempsted House in New London, Connecticut
- Died: September 8, 1937 (aged 62); New London, Connecticut
- Education: Smith College
- Occupation: Poet
- Writing career
- Notable work: Sonnets From a Lock Box

Anna Hempstead Branch (March 18, 1875 – September 8, 1937) was an American poet. She was regarded as a major poet during her life, labeled by William Thomas Stead "the Browning of American poetry".

== Early life ==
Branch was born at Hempsted House in New London, Connecticut in 1875, the younger child of John Locke Branch, a lawyer, and Mary Lydia Bolles Branch (1840–1922), a children's author and poet who was part of Hempstead family, who had lived in the area since 1640 and owned some of the oldest houses in southeast Connecticut.

== Education ==
Branch spent most of her school years in New York and Brooklyn where she studied at Smith College, as well as Froebel and Adelphi Academies, which were near her father's law practice. After graduating from Smith College in 1897, she studied dramaturgy at the American Academy of Dramatic Arts, earning her degree in 1900. A year after graduating from Smith, her poem "The Road 'Twixt Heaven and Hell" was selected as the year's best verse by a college graduate by Century Magazine. Starting with that recognition, Branch regularly placed her poetry in a variety of national magazines, and Houghton Mifflin published her first collection of poetry in 1901

Branch's reputation was made with her first two collections The Shoes That Danced (1905) and Rose of the Wind (1910). Both works show a Pre-Raphaelite influence on her poetry, especially in the use of non-traditional characters and allusions. "The Wedding Feast," a poem from the first collection, reworks Coleridge's "The Rime of the Ancient Mariner." The second collection features odd settings and characters. And her most famous single poem "Nimrod"—a blank verse epic staged at the Empire Theatre in 1908—is about a Biblical king who inspired several pre-Raphaelite works.

Sonnets from a Lock Box (1929) is regarded as her best work. It is a collection of thirty-eight sonnets using the first person, noted for its directness and mystical symbolism. Her final collection of poetry, Last Poems (1944), was published posthumously by Ridgely Torrence. Branch was also the author of A Christmas Miracle and God Bless this House (1925) and Bubble Blower's House (1926).

Branch was also known for her philanthropy, mostly centered around Christodora House, a settlement house in New York City. There she created the Poet's Guild, whose members, including Edwin Arlington Robinson, William Rose Benét, Percy MacKaye, and Margaret Widdemer, taught classes at the house. Branch was also vice president of the Poetry Society of America.

== Later life ==
In 1918 she served as the vice president of the National League for Women's Service and chaired the education and festival committees in the War Camp Community Service. She founded and directed the Poets' Guild of Christodora House which thrived due to her assiduous attention and ability to enlist the participation of an impressive array of fellow poets. Among this involved were Edwin Markham, Josephine Preston Peabody, Percy MacKaye, William Rose Benét, Margaret Widdemer, Ridgely Torrence, Sara Teasdale, Robert Frost, and Edwin Arlington Robinson. Branch was very active in trying to bring poetry into people's lives during the 1910s and 1920s. The Guild also created the "Unbound Anthology". Poems were nicely printed and sold for five cents each, people were able to get poetry cheaply and the profits would go back into the settlement house work. in 1934 Branch received an honorary degree from Smith College.

Hempstead often was invited to various colleges and high schools in the east. She was invited to speak at Wellesley College, which is a women's college, on November 9, 1926.

Branch never married. She died of cancer at the age of 62.
