= Marion Vree =

American classical composer

Marion Frances Wyma Vree-Brown (18 July 1920 – 10 April 2012) was an American composer/arranger and music educator.

Vree was born in Grand Rapids, Michigan, to Peter and Mina (Westrate) Wyma. She studied music at the University of Southern California, receiving her BM in 1947, MM in 1953, and DMA 1975. The title of her dissertation was The Development of Netherlands Psalmody from 1565-1773 through the Study of the Bourgeois Tune for Psalm 42. She married Henry Vree and they had a son, Dale, before Vree's death in 1976. She remarried Harry Wesley Brown Jr. in 1980 and changed her name to Vree-Brown, although her music was published under the name Marion Vree.

Vree taught music and directed choral groups in Los Angeles at Alexander Hamilton High School and at Pierce College. She participated in the 1987 Congress on Women in Music (now the International Alliance for Women in Music), during which she hosted a house concert with composer Deborah Kavasch.

Vree composed and arranged music which was published by Alfred Music, Carl Fischer Music, Harold Flammer Inc., Theodore Presser Company, Shawnee Press, and Walton Music (now GIA Publications).

== Works ==
Her compositions for choir (with piano or organ accompaniment unless otherwise indicated), include:

- Amarilli, Mia Bella (Giulio Caccini/Marion Vree)
- Christ is Born – French Christmas Carol
- Come, Let Us Sing Unto the Lord (Francois Couperin/Marion Vree)
- Consecration
- From Heaven High I Come to You
- God is My Shepherd (with flute or oboe; Anton Dvorak/Marion Vree)
- Lamento della Ninfa (The Nymph's Lament; Claudio Monteverdi/Marion Vree)
- Lord will Come
- O Jesu so Sweet (a cappella; Samuel Scheidt/Marion Vree)
- O Love Forlorn (a capella; English folk song arranged by Marion Vree)
- O Worship the King
- On This Day the Earth Shall Ring
- Praise the Lord, His Glories Show (Henry Francis Lyte/Marion Vree)
- Praise to the Living God (with trumpet and timpani)
- Prettiest of the City
- Quant Mon Mary Vient De Dehors (When Home from Work My Husband Comes; a cappella; Orlande de Lassus/Marion Vree)
- Shenandoah (American folk song arranged by Marion Vree)
- Two Songs of Praise
- Ye Servants of God (Paderborn Hymn Book/Charles Wesley/Marion Vree)
