= Maud Sargent =

American architect (1899–1992)

Maud Sargent (1899 – 1992) was a landscape architect and planner.

In 1933, she earned a B.S. from Cornell University, and in 1934 she earned a M.L.A. from Smith College.

She worked for the New York City Department of Parks from 1934 to 1938. In 1935, Carl Schurz Park was reconstructed by Robert Moses, due to the creation of the FDR Drive, with revised landscaping by Sargent. Also in 1938, Sargent represented America at an international meeting of architects, city planners, and landscape architects in Geneva, Switzerland. She later worked for the Public Works Division of the Manhattan Borough President's office from 1938 to 1943. In 1943, she joined the Navy, where she was an officer. After World War II Sargent served as the senior land planner in the office of the Philadelphia City Planning Commission. In the 1960s, she worked for the Connecticut City Planning Commission, having moved to that state. In 1985, she was given an award by the Connecticut Society of Architects and the Connecticut chapter of the American Society of Landscape Architects for her plan for Guilford Green.

The Maud Sargent Papers, 1931–1992, are held as #4861 at the Division of Rare and Manuscript Collections at the Cornell University Library.
