= Ruth Stuber Jeanne =

Classical Percussionist

- Birth name: Ruth Stuber
- Born: May 13, 1910
- Died: April 6, 2004 (aged 94); Newark, Ohio, USA
- Genres: classical
- Occupation(s): Percussionist, violinist, arranger, educator
- Instrument(s): percussion, violin

Ruth Stuber Jeanne (née Stuber; b. 13 May 1910, Chicago; d. 6 Apr. 2004, Newark, Ohio) was an American marimbist, percussionist, violinist, and arranger. On April 29, 1940, at Carnegie Hall, she and Orchestrette Classique, an all female orchestra, premiered the Concertino for Marimba and Orchestra by American composer Paul Creston, who was present. Creston wrote Concertino for Stuber and dedicated it to the orchestra's director, Frédérique Petrides (pronounced pe TREE dis), who asked Creston to compose it. The 1940 program note stated that Concertino was then "the only work ever written for this instrument in serious form." Jeanne was a tympanist with Orchestrette Classique.

== Training ==
Her father, Benjamin F. Stuber, taught strings in the Evanston (IL) public schools. Her early training was as violinist, and she played violin in the Evanston Symphony in high school and while studying at Northwestern University's School of Music in the early 1930s, being elected chair of the music students' social committee in fall 1931. In 1933, while living in Chicago, Stuber acquired her first marimba, and, in her words, "just took off!" Clair Omar Musser (1901–98) was her first marimba teacher. She played in Musser’s 100-piece Marimba Orchestra for the 1933 World’s Fair in Chicago. By fall 1933 she lived in Florence, Alabama, where her father opened his Stuber School of Music. She was then performing widely around the region on both marimba and violin. Also, in Florence, she taught marimba and founded a marimba ensemble that performed both for live audiences and on WNRA radio. She taught music in Alabama's public schools, and also at the Women's College of Alabama in Montgomery, renamed Huntington College in 1935. In 1936, Stuber moved to New York City where she studied marimba with George Hamilton Green and timpani with George Braun, who would serve as percussionist (tympanist) with the Metropolitan Opera Orchestra from 1920 to 1954. Beginning in 1937, she taught band and orchestra in the Carle Place schools of Nassau County, NY.

== Family ==
In 1941, Ruth Stuber married Armand L. Jeanne (b. 14 June 1911, Cornol, Switzerland; d. 16 Sept. 16, 1968). Ruth and Armand had two sons.

Both Ruth and Armand are buried at Maple Grove Cemetery, Granville, Ohio.
