= Nathaniel Hempstead House =

Historic house in Connecticut, United States

- Nathaniel Hempsted House
- U.S. National Register of Historic Places
- U.S. Historic district – Contributing property
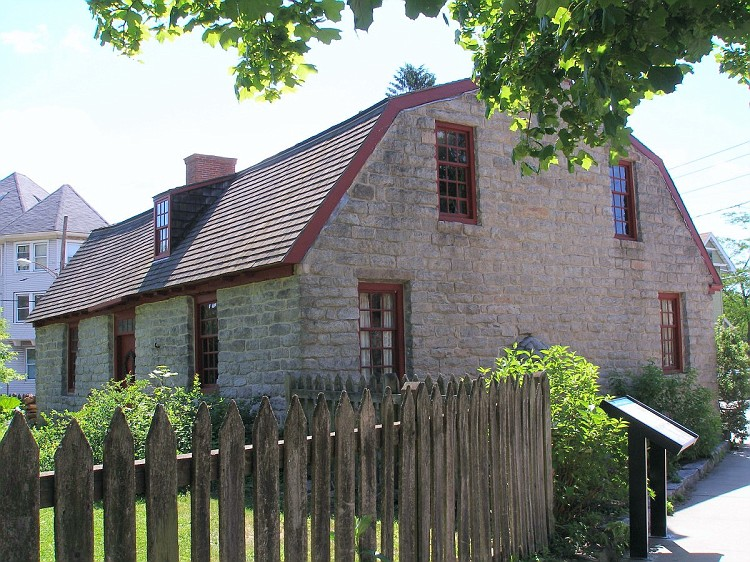
- Photographed in 2007

- Location within Connecticut Location within the United States
- Location: Corner of Jay, Hempstead, Coit, and Truman Streets, New London, Connecticut
- Coordinates: 41°21′6″N 72°6′9″W
- Area: 0.5 acres (0.20 ha)
- Built: 1759
- Part of: Hempstead Historic District (ID86002112)
- NRHP reference No.: 70000702

Significant dates
- Added to NRHP: December 2, 1970
- Designated CP: July 31, 1986

The Nathaniel Hempstead House, also known as the Old Huguenot House, is a historic house museum on Hempstead Street in New London, Connecticut. Built about 1759, it is an architecturally unusual stone house with a gambrel roof, a style not otherwise seen in the city. Because of its unusual form, it was thought to have been built by French Huguenot immigrants at an earlier date. The house is owned by Connecticut Landmarks, along with the adjacent Joshua Hempsted House, operating the pair as the Hempstead Houses museum. The house was listed on the National Register of Historic Places on December 2, 1970.

== Description and history ==
The Nathaniel Hempstead House is located west of downtown New London, set close to the road at the corner of Hempstead and Truman Streets. It is a 1 1/2-story stone structure with a gambrel roof and brick end chimneys. The walls are formed out of dressed granite laid in regular courses with mortar. Its main facade is four bays wide, with the entrance in one of the center bays. A single small shed-roof dormer projects from the rear roof's steep face.

Although the house was built in 1759 by Nathaniel Hempstead, the English grandson of Joshua Hempstead (whose 1678 home stands adjacent), its form and building material are unusual for southern New England in that period, leading to local lore attributing its construction to French Huguenot immigrants. It is possible that laborers who built the house were Acadians resettled to New London after the Expulsion of the Acadians from Nova Scotia in the 1750s. The same workers may have worked on another major stone building in the city, the Shaw Mansion.

== See also ==
- National Register of Historic Places listings in New London County, Connecticut
