= Alliene Brandon Webb =

American composer, singer, and teacher

Alliene Gibbons Brandon Webb (January 2, 1910 – November 16, 1965) was an American composer, singer, and teacher who was born in Palestine, Texas, to Blanche and George Thomas Brandon. She married Robert Barron Webb in 1934.

Webb completed a B.A. degree at Southern Methodist University in Dallas, where she lived for the rest of her life. She studied voice with Peter Tchach, and was a soloist and choir director at Park Cities Baptist Church for 12 years. She continued composing and also gave piano lessons until her death in 1965.

Webb's compositions were published by Carl Fischer Music, Chas. H. Hansen Music Corporation, Edward B. Marks Music (now Carlin America), Leeds Music Corporation (see Lou Levy), and Theodore Presser Company.

Her compositions include:

== Orchestra ==
- Sleepy Head (also arranged for medium voice)

== Piano ==
- "Hop Scotch" (1955)
- "Skates on the Zuider Zee" (1955)
- Three Piano Solos in Early Grades (1953)

== Vocal ==
- Are He Gone, Have He Went
- Endless Song (mixed chorus)
- Father, Teach Me to Pray (mixed chorus)
- He's Walking with Me (mixed chorus)
- Hosanna to His Name (Christmas anthem; mixed chorus)
- "Last Night I Walked in the Garden" (medium voice)
- "Mule's Tail" (medium voice)
- My Father's Prayer (Father's Day anthem; mixed chorus or women's chorus)
- Nine Short Choral Responses for Protestant Churches (mixed chorus)
- Our Wedding Prayer
- "Sleepy Head" (medium voice; also arranged for orchestra)
- "'Twas the Night Before Christmas" (voice and piano; text by Clement Moore)

== External Link ==
Find a Grave Link
