= Louise Siddall =

American composer

Louise Siddall (27 January 1879 - 8 December 1935) was an American composer, organist, and music educator.

Siddall was born in Winston-Salem, North Carolina, to Ellen and Henry A. Siddall. Her father was a member of the North Carolina 26th Regimental Band during the Civil War. Her family attended a Moravian church. Siddall studied music at Salem College and voice with the Baroness Katharine Evans von Klenner.

Siddall taught at Salem College and later chaired the music department at Winthrop College. She was president of the St. Cecelia Choral Club in 1929, and president of the Afternoon Music Club in 1931. She died in a car accident in Sumter, South Carolina, in 1935.

Siddall’s music was published by Theodore Presser Co. Her works include:

== Organ ==
- At Even
- Hymn of Praise

== Vocal ==
- “Lullaby”
