= Lois Rhea =

American musician (1916–2004)

Lois Burford Rhea Land (24 September 1916 – December 2004) was an American composer, music educator, and organist. She taught and published as Lois Rhea and Lois Rhea Land.

Rhea was born in Milton, Kansas, to Lela Baker and Melville C. Burford. She earned music degrees from Northwestern University, and married composer Raymond Rhea. They had one daughter. Although information on a later marriage is not available, after Raymond’s death in 1970, she changed her name to Lois Rhea Land.

Rhea served as an organist for Munger Place and Northaven United Methodist churches in Texas, and Holy Trinity Episcopal Church in Rockwall, Texas, among others. From 1945 to 1964, she worked as a music teacher in Corpus Christi, Texas, public schools. She was an accompanist for the Texas All-State Choir in the 1950s and 1960s. In 1964, she moved to Southern Methodist University, where she chaired the graduate music education division until 1980. She then became an adjunct professor of music education at Texas Christian University in Fort Worth, Texas until 1988.

Rhea was a founding member of the Texas Choral Directors Association in 1950. She served as a judge and presented music education clinics throughout southwest Texas. In 2003, she was paralyzed after a fall until her death in December 2004.

Rhea’s textbooks and compositions were published by Alliance Music Company, Bourne Company, Colla Voce Music, Edwin H. Morris and Company, Elkan-Vogel, Harcourt Brace Jovanovich, Lawson-Gould Music, Mark Foster Music, Plymouth Music Company Inc., Prentice-Hall, and Southern Music. Her works included:

== Books ==
- several volumes of sight-reading materials
- A Christmas Program Book for Treble Voices (with Raymond Rhea)
- A Guide to Student Teaching in Music (with Joan Boney)
- Music in Today's Classroom: Creating, Listening, Performing

== Vocal ==
- A Cappella: Songs without Words
- Little Trotty Wagtail (SSA; text by John Clare)
- Prayer (music by Johannes Brahms; arranged by Lois Rhea Land)
- The Sea Shell (SA choir)
- Time of Christmas (SSA)
