= Hazel Volkart =

American composer, music educator, and pianist

Hazel O. Cline Volkart (20 May 1907 – 21 May 1985) was an American composer, music educator, and pianist.

Volkart studied music at the Oklahoma College for Women, the Kansas City Conservatory, the University of Missouri (Kansas City), and the University of Kansas. Her teachers included Bertha Hornaday, Dr. Wiktor Labunskid, Dr. Francis Buebendort, and Carl Busch. She married Emil J. Volkart in 1931 and they had a daughter (Bettye).

Volkart was a private piano teacher in Kansas and Missouri for many years. She was an active member of Mu Phi Epsilon and won first place from Mu Phi Epsilon in 1963 for her Sonatina in C, as well as Honorable Mention in 1956 and an unspecified award in 1957.

Volkart's music was published by Mills Music, Schroeder & Gunther, Inc, and Theodore Presser Company. Her compositions included:

== Piano ==
- At the Circus
- Choctaw Indian Dance
- Cruise on the River
- Four Piano Pieces (Bob-o-Link, Dance of the Marionettes, Grandfather's Clock, Little Lullaby)
- Japanese Doll Dance
- Little Buckaroo
- Pirate King
- Ridin' Along (four hands)

== Strings ==
String Method Books I, II, and III
