= Orchestrette Classique =

American chamber orchestra

Orchestrette Classique (changed to Orchestrette of New York)
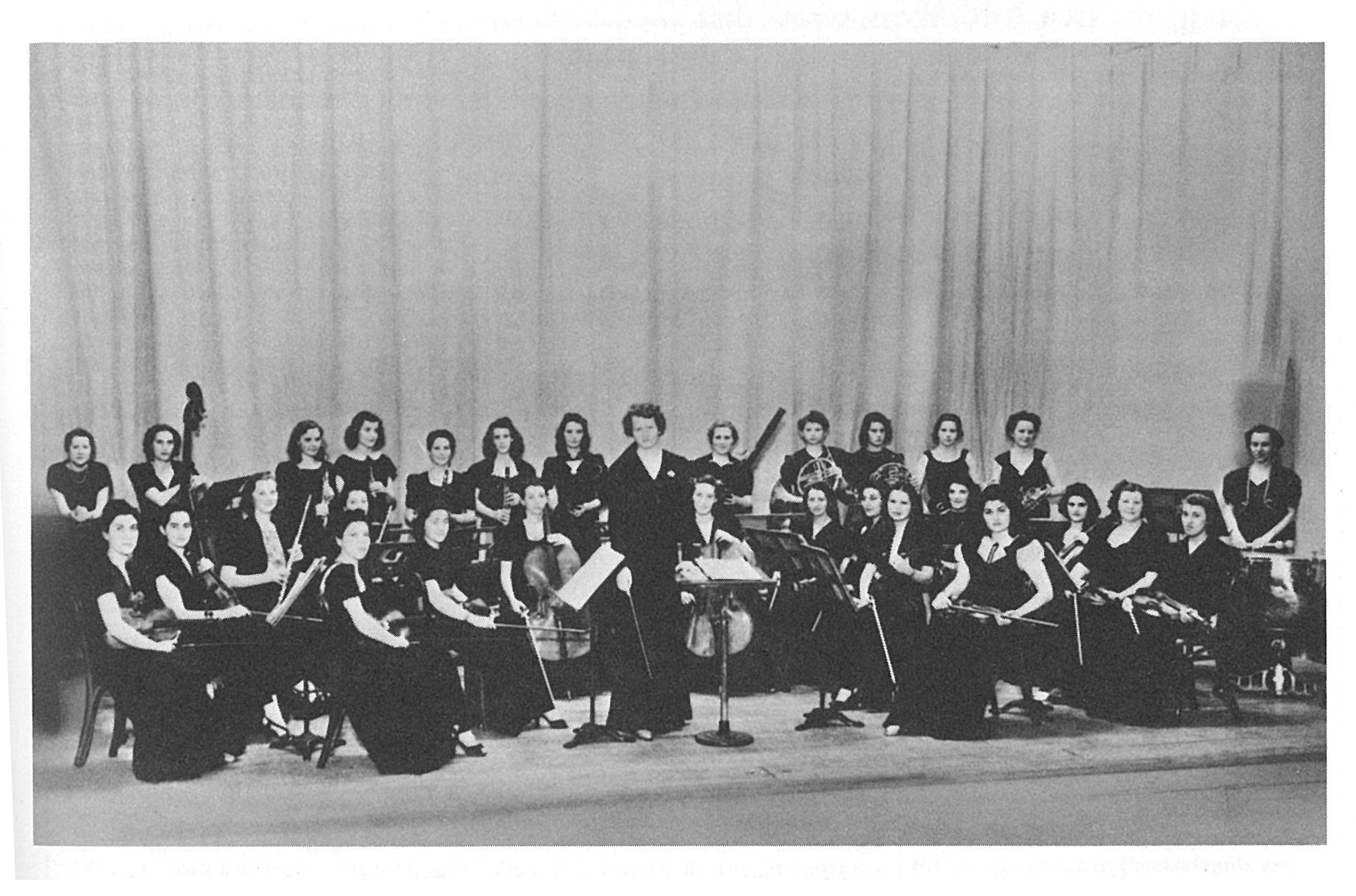
- Frédérique Petrides with the Orchestrette Classique. Courtesy of the New York Public Library for the Performing Arts, Music Division, and The University of Arkansas Press
- Formation: 1932
- Dissolved: 1943
- Type: All women classical chamber orchestra
- Purpose: To present little known works by classical masters and new works by American composers, and advance the status of women musicians
- Headquarters: Manhattan, New York
- Location: Manhattan, New York
- Official language: English
- Founder and conductor: Madame Frédérique Petrides
- Main organ: Orchestrette Classique
- Remarks: The Orchestrette gave five to six concerts annually in Carnegie Chamber Music Hall (now Weill Recital Hall), and premiered works by Samuel Barber, Paul Creston, David Diamond and others.

Orchestrette Classique, later called Orchestrette of New York (1932–1943) was an American chamber orchestra in New York made up of women musicians. It was founded in 1932 by conductor Frédérique Petrides (1903–1983), who served as conductor for the group until it ceased operations in 1943. She also founded the West Side Orchestral Concerts.

== A musical anomaly ==
When, in 1933, Frédérique Petrides lifted her baton to give the first downbeat to the all-women instrumentalists of her Orchestrette Classique, this was an anomaly. Petrides was a pioneer, one of the first women orchestral conductors at a time when the idea of a woman wielding a baton was almost unthinkable.

== Founder and conductor, Frédérique Petrides' early years ==
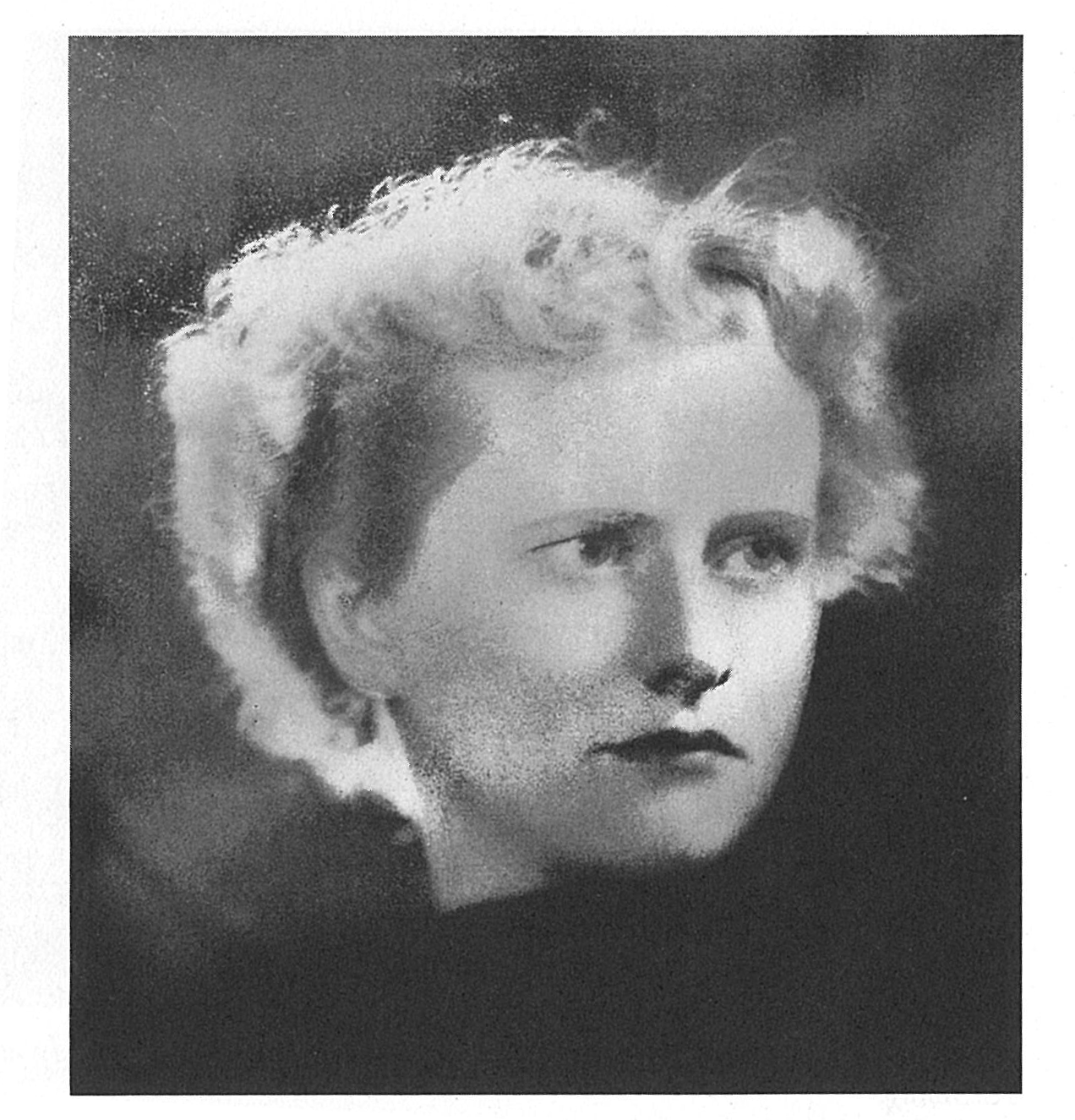
Frédérique Petrides in the 1930s

On September 26, 1903, Frédérique Jeanne Elisabeth Petronella Mayer was born into a privileged life in Antwerp, Belgium. Her mother, Seraphine Sebrechts, an artist of many talents, was a well-known composer and pianist, as well as an accomplished painter and photographer. It was she who taught Frédérique theory and composition. And in 1923, the young musician emigrated to New York with the aim of becoming a conductor.

== The Orchestrette ==
In 1931, she married journalist, Peter Petrides (Petros Agathangelos Petrides; 1896–1978), who wholeheartedly supported her career, and encouraged her to found the Orchestrette Classique, of which he became the manager and publicist. Frédérique Petrides had learned that, in the 1930s, the only avenue open to women conductors was to establish their own orchestras. And in 1933, she introduced the Orchestrette, an all-women chamber orchestra, which had, based on what was being played, thirty to forty players in the ensemble; and which gave five to six concerts annually in Carnegie Chamber Music Hall, now Weill Recital Hall.

=== American composers ===
During its twelve-year existence, the Orchestrette Classique, renamed the Orchestrette of New York in 1942, programmed little known works for small orchestra by established masters, and new work mainly by native and naturalized American composers.

Very little new music was being presented at the time and the Orchestrette premiered and played works by David Diamond (Concerto for Chamber Orchestra), commissioned Norman Dello Joio, Aaron Copland (Quiet City), Samuel Barber (Adagio for Strings), New York Premiere Paul Creston (Partita for Flute and Violin with String Orchestra and Concerto for Marimba with Orchestra), concerto commissioned Julia Smith (Episodic Suite), commissioned Ulric Cole (Two Sketches for String Orchestra), Henry Cowell, American Melting Pot, Movement 1 Chorale: (Teutonic-American), world premiereGian Carlo Menotti (Pastorale), Ralph Vaughan Williams, (Flos Campi), US Premiere and others.

The Orchestrette and Petrides received much coverage and praise in the press. Robert Simon, writing in The New Yorker on December 12, 1936, sums this up, "She concocts some of the best programs in town."

=== Premieres by the Orchestrette ===
- May 1, 1939 – Samuel Barber Adagio for Strings Carnegie Chamber Music Hall, now Weill Recital Hall, (New York premiere)
- May 3, 1943 – Henry Cowell American Melting Pot: Set for Chamber Orchestra, Movement 1, Chorale (Teutonic- American) Carnegie Chamber Music Hall, now Weill Recital Hall, (world premiere)
- April 29, 1940 – Paul Creston, Concertino for marimba and orchestra, Ruth Stuber, soloist, Carnegie Chamber Music Hall, now Weill Recital Hall, (world premiere)
- October 14, 1940 – David Diamond, Concerto in E-flat major, Lonnie Epstein, soloist (piano), Carnegie Chamber Music Hall, now Weill Recital Hall, (world premiere)
- December 10, 1940 – Nikolai Myakowsky, Sinfonietta for string orchestra, Carnegie Chamber Music Hall, now Weill Recital Hall, (US premiere)

==== An addendum of interest ====
"An added note of interest—when Paul Creston was a young composer and unknown, it was Frédérique Petrides and her orchestra who premiered many of his compositions. Eventually his works were conducted by Arturo Toscanini, Leopold Stokowski, Eugene Ormandy and others. When he wrote Chant of 1942, Toscanini requested his permission to premiere the composition. Creston refused, saying permission would be granted only after the Orchestrette of New York played it. The piece was dedicated to Petrides and he remained true to the conductor who had given him his early opportunities. Eventually he added to the piece, and the New York Philharmonic programmed the composition.

==== A comment from a critic ====
The World Telegram on April 22, 1941, printed, "When Miss Petrides runs short of standard material, she never delves among the sub-standard. She seeks instead the new and unfamiliar, and not once in eight seasons of concerts has she offered dullness as a substitute for guaranteed pleasure."

=== World War II ===
Because the Orchestrette of New York was an ensemble of outstanding women musicians, with the advent of the Second World War and the draft, many of its instrumentalists were, for the first time, offered positions in the major symphony orchestras, as replacements for their masculine counterparts who were joining the front lines. Petrides, not wanting to stand in the way of her players' advancement, elected to disband the Orchestrette, which gave its last performance in 1943. From then on, until the end of her career in 1977, Frédérique Petrides conducted mixed orchestras and continued to program little known compositions by classical composers, and premieres of new works.

=== The Orchestrette publication ('Women in Music' newsletter) ===
In addition to leading the Orchestrette, from 1935 to 1940, with the help of her husband, Frédérique Petrides edited and published the Women in Music newsletters, under the auspices of the Orchestrette. The only music periodical of its kind, it chronicled and championed the activities of women musicians from ancient Egyptian times to the then present. It was a publication with a circulation of over 2,500.

=== About the musicians ===
In 1981, some forty-eight years after she founded the Orchestrette Classique Madame Petrides said:

I kept my orchestra small because I wanted quality musicians—most of the women in the group were studying at the Curtis Institute, and the Juilliard School. One must remember that at that time only a very few women played bassoon, oboe, horn, clarinet and trumpet. Parents did not want their daughters playing these instruments because they were not considered ladylike.

My idea was to keep the Orchestrette small and show what could be accomplished by good musicians—I did not stress women musicians. They were talented and many of my players were trained by excellent teachers from the New York Philharmonic. The concerts were unique since I programmed little-known works by the great masters, as well as premiering new works by young American composers.

The concerts were usually given on Monday evenings because the Philharmonic Orchestra did not perform that evening, and the music critics were available. We added a new musical dimension to the life of the city.

=== Members (and soloists) ===
- Hinda Barnett, violin, concert-master
- Anne Berger-Littman, violin
- Beulah Bernstein, flute
- Frances Blaisdell flute
- Anne Brown
- Lilli Busse, violin
- Ruth Cubbage, flute
- Helen Enser, horn
- Lonny Epstein, piano and soloist
- Frances Fletcher, soloist
- Ruth Freeman, flute
- Susan Kessler
- Isabella Leon, viola
- Eugenie Limberg, violin, viola
- Frances Magnes, violin, soloist
- William Masselos piano, soloist
- Beatrice Merlau, clarinet
- Florence Nicolaides, viola
- Rhea Onhaus, cello
- Julio Oyanguren, guitar soloist
- Betty Paret, harp soloist
- Virginia Payton, soloist
- Lois Platt, flute
- Shirley Portnoi, violin and soloist
- Carolyn Potter, bass
- Frieda Reisberg, violin
- Lillian Rosenfield, violin
- Zena Scherer, violin
- Margaret Rosov Schillinger, violin
- Doris Schirmeister, trumpet
- Frances Shapiro, violin soloist
- Elizabeth Shugart, violin
- Ilene Skolnak, violin
- Julia Smith piano, composer
- Ellen Stone, horn
- Ruth Stuber, tympani and marimba
- Hetty K. Turnbull, horn
- Lois Wann, oboe, soloist

== Sources ==
- Frédérique Petrides Papers, Classmark JPB 83-3, Music Division of the New York Public Library for the Performing Arts, Lincoln Center
- Frédérique Petrides, Leader In Women's Music Activities, The New York Times, January 13, 1983
- Jan Bell Groh (1936– ), Evening the Score: Women in Music and the Legacy of Frédérique Petrides, University of Arkansas Press, Fayetteville (1991)
- Jane Weiner LePage (1931–2008 ), Women composers, conductors, and musicians of the twentieth century, Volume ii, Scarecrow Press, Metuchen, New Jersey and London (1983)
- Women in Music – An Anthology of Source Readings from the Middle Ages to the Present, edited by Carol Neuls-Bates (1939– ), Harper & Row, Publishers (1982)
- Pendle, Karin Swanson, PhD (1939– ), Women in Music, Indiana University Press (2001)
