= Julia Smith (composer) =

American composer, pianist and musicologist (1905–1989)

Julia Frances Smith
- Born: 25 January 1905; Denton, Texas, United States
- Died: 18 April 1989 (aged 84); New York City, New York, United States
- Musical career
- Occupations: Composer, pianist
- Instrument: Piano

Julia Frances Smith ( January 25, 1905 – April 18, 1989) was an American composer, pianist and musicologist.

== Life and career ==
She was born in Denton, Texas.

She graduated from University of North Texas College of Music (1930) and then continued with graduate studies in piano and composition at the Juilliard School with Reuben Goldmark and Frederick Jacobi from 1932 to 1939, earning a diploma. She simultaneously studied at New York University earning a master's degree in 1933 and a PhD in 1952. From 1932 to 1939, she served as pianist for the Orchestrette Classique of New York, a women's orchestra. During this time, she also gave concerts of mostly American music in Latin America, Europe, and throughout the United States. As a performer, she became particularly associated with the works of Aaron Copland. From 1941 to 1946, she taught at the Hartt School, where she founded the department of music education. She collaborated with composer Cecile Vashaw on The Work and Play String Method, an instructional series for violin, viola, cello, and bass. She joined ASCAP in 1945.

As a composer, Smith is best known for her operas and orchestral works, which have all been performed. Her music incorporates elements of jazz, folk music and 20th-century French harmony. Her compositional style has an appealing directness and although tonal, makes interesting use of dissonance. Among her works are a string quartet (1964) which uses irregular metres and driving rhythms, and the operas Cynthia Parker and Cockcrow, which employ folk music within a generally conservative tonal idiom.

Cynthia Parker was Smith's first opera. She had long been determined to write an opera on a Texas story, and that of Cynthia Parker was a gripping one. Kidnapped by Native Americans, Parker was raised by Comanche, eventually marrying a chief and raising three children of her own. She was found by Texas Rangers and returned to white society, but was unhappy there and eventually committed suicide. Smith plays up the differences between Native and settler cultures by using stereotypical "Indian" tropes for the Comanche and familiar and popular folk music for the white colonists of the American West.

Smith was the recipient of several commissions and awards and was active in several music organizations, especially the National Federation of Music Clubs, for which she chaired the Decade of Women Committee (1970–79). As a writer her publications include Aaron Copland: his Work and Contribution to American Music (New York, 1955) and a Directory of American Women Composers (Chicago, 1970), of which she was the editor.

She died in New York City. Many of her manuscripts, including those of her operas, are held by the Music Library at the University of North Texas in Denton.

== Selected compositions ==
- Allegiance: Patriotic Song (c. 1918)
- Cynthia Parker, opera (c. 1939)
- Stranger of Manzano, opera; libretto by John William Rogers
- Characteristic Suite for piano (c. 1949)
- Cockcrow, one-act opera (1953)
- American Dance Suite for two pianos, four hands (c. 1957)
- Quartet for strings (1964)
- Remember the Alamo (with Cecile Vashaw) (1965)
- Two Pieces for viola and piano (1966)
- Trio-Cornwall for Violin, Cello and Piano (1966)
- Concerto in E minor for piano and orchestra (1938; rev. 1971)
- "Glory to the Green and White", University of North Texas alma mater
- Daisy, opera in 2 acts; libretto by Bertita Harding
- God Bless This House from the American opera Daisy; text from the poem "Blessing the House" by Anna Hempstead Branch (c. 1974)
- Five pieces, for Double Bass and Piano, double bass part edited by Homer R. Mensch (c. 1985)
- Prairie Kaleidoscope: five songs for voice and piano, poems by Ona Mae Ratcliff (née Minnick; 1909–2001), music by Julia Smith (1981)
- Suite for Wind Octet, (1980)

== Selected writings ==
- Julia Smith, Aaron Copland, his work and contribution to American music, Dutton, New York (1955)
- Directory of American women composers, with selected music for senior & junior clubs, compiled and edited by Julia Smith, National Federation of Music Clubs (1970)

== Teaching positions ==
- 1935: Smith began part-time teaching at the Hamlin School, Fair Lawn, NJ
- 1940–42: taught at Juilliard
- 1941–46: taught at the Hartt School, where she founded and served as head of the Department of Music Education
- 1944–46: taught at Teachers College of Connecticut

== Family ==
On April 23, 1938, Julia Smith married Oscar Albert Vielehr (b. Aug. 4, 1892, Rochester, NY; d. Nov 30, 1975, New York, NY), an engineer and inventor who worked for the Gyroscope Company, an Army ordnance plant. They met at a concert.

== Sources ==
- Who's Who in American Music: Classical, R.R. Bowker, New York (1983), ISBN 0-8352-1725-6
- Baker's Biographical Dictionary of Musicians, Eighth edition, revised by Nicolas Slonimsky (1894–1995), Macmillan Publishing Co., New York (1992), p. 1734-5, ISBN 0-02-872415-1
- Baker's Biographical Dictionary of Musicians, Ninth edition, edited by Laura Diane Kuhn (born 1953), Schirmer Books, New York (2001)
- Baker's Biographical Dictionary of Twentieth-Century Classical Musicians, by Nicolas Slonimsky (1894–1995), Schirmer Books, New York (1997), p. 1275, ISBN 0-02-871271-4
- Baker's Dictionary of Opera, edited by Laura Diane Kuhn (born 1953), Schirmer Books, New York (2000), ISBN 0-02-865349-1
- Contemporary Authors. A bio-bibliographical guide to current writers in fiction, general nonfiction, poetry, journalism, drama, motion pictures, television, and other fields, Volume 128. Detroit: Gale Research, Detroit (1990), ISBN 0-8103-7770-5
- The New American Dictionary of Music, by Philip David Morehead (born 1942) with Anne MacNeil, Dutton, New York (1991), ISBN 0-525-93345-X
- The New Grove Dictionary of Opera, four volumes, edited by Stanley Sadie (1930–2005), Grove's Dictionaries of Music, New York. ISBN 0-333-73432-7 and ISBN 1-56159-228-5
- The New Grove Dictionary of Women Composers, edited by Julie Anne Sadie & Rhian Samuel, Macmillan Publishers, London; W.W. Norton, New York (1994) OCLC 31761482, ISBN 0-333-51598-6
- The Concise Baker's Biographical Dictionary of Musicians, Eighth edition, revised by Nicolas Slonimsky (1894–1995), New York, NY: Schirmer Books (1994), p. 953, ISBN 0-02-872416-X.
- ASCAP (1948) The ASCAP Biographical Dictionary, 1st ed., p. 345.
- ASCAP (1952) The ASCAP Biographical Dictionary, 2nd ed., p. 467-8.
- ASCAP (1966) The ASCAP Biographical Dictionary, 3rd ed., p. 688.
- ASCAP (1980) The ASCAP Biographical Dictionary, 4th ed., p. 472-3, ISBN 0-8352-1283-1.
- Zaimont, Judith Lang (born 1945) & Karen Famera, Contemporary Concert Music by Women: A Directory of the Composers and Their Works, p. 118-9, Westport, CT: Greenwood Press (1998), ISBN 0-313-22921-X
- Holdridge L. (2012) Visual Representation as a Method of Discourse on Captivity, Focused on Cynthia Ann Parker. In: Carocci M., Pratt S. (eds) Native American Adoption, Captivity, and Slavery in Changing Contexts. Studies of the Americas. Palgrave Macmillan, New York
- Katie R. Buehner, Accessibility and authenticity in Julia Smith's “Cynthia Parker”. MM thesis, University of North Texas, ProQuest Dissertations Publishing, 2007. 1451995.
