= Joshua Hempsted House =

Historic house in Connecticut

- U.S. National Register of Historic Places
- U.S. Historic district – Contributing property
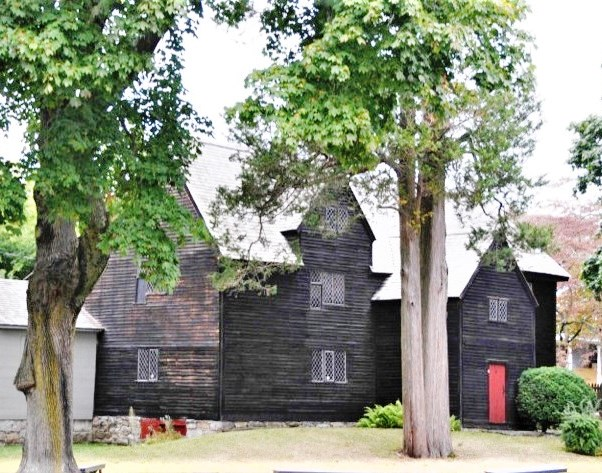

- Location within Connecticut Location within the United States
- Location: 11 Hempstead Street, New London, Connecticut
- Coordinates: 41°21′9″N 72°6′8″W
- Area: 2 acres (0.81 ha)
- Built: c. 1678
- Architect: Hempsted, Joshua
- Architectural style: First Period
- Part of: Hempstead Historic District (ID86002112)
- NRHP reference No.: 70000701

Significant dates
- Added to NRHP: October 15, 1970
- Designated CP: July 31, 1986

The Joshua Hempsted House is a historic house museum at 11 Hempstead Street in New London, Connecticut, built about 1678 and altered several times during the 18th century. It is one of the state's oldest surviving buildings, and provides a virtual catalog of early construction methods due to its state of preservation. The house was acquired by Connecticut Landmarks in 1937, which operates it and the adjacent 1759 Nathaniel Hempstead House as a historic house museum complex known as the Hempsted Houses. The houses have been restored to reflect a late 17th to mid 18th-century appearance, and they were listed on the National Register of Historic Places in 1970.

== Description and history ==
The Hempsted House is located west of downtown New London on the east side of Hempstead Street between Hope and Truman Streets. It is a 2 1/2-story wood-frame structure, with a side-gable roof that has two front-facing gables. The left gable projects forward of the main block, providing an enclosed vestibule on the first floor—an unusual feature for houses of the time. Window openings are generally narrow and filled with diamond-pane casement windows. The interior has exposed framing members that show the building's great age.

The oldest portion of the house was three bays wide, and was a typical one-room structure with a chimney on one end. There is some disagreement by architectural historians, but it was probably built around 1678 by Joshua Hempstead, the father of local diarist Joshua Hempsted. It is one of Connecticut's oldest buildings and has long been recognized for its architectural and historical significance, having been studied by Norman Isham and Frederick Kelly, prominent early architectural historians of the region.

The house escaped destruction during the 1780 Battle of Groton Heights, in which much of New London was destroyed, because the Hempsteads had prepared a large family reunion meal which was confiscated by the attacking British forces. It was used as a safe house as part of the Underground Railroad. It remained in the Hempstead family until 1937, when it was acquired by the organization now known as Connecticut Landmarks.

== See also ==
- List of the oldest buildings in Connecticut
- National Register of Historic Places listings in New London County, Connecticut
