= Theodore Strongin =

American entomologist

Theodore Strongin (December 10, 1918 – November 24, 1998) was an American music critic, composer, flautist, and entomologist.

== Life and career ==
Born in New York City, Strongin grew up in Darien, Connecticut. He studied both music and biology at Harvard University and Bard College. He specialized in the field of entomology and after graduating from college worked for the American Museum of Natural History where he identified multiple species of rare beetles. From 1942 to 1946 he served in the United States Army. After the end of World War II he pursued studies in the flute and music composition at the Juilliard School and the Columbia Graduate School of Arts and Sciences. During his time at Columbia in the 1950s, several of his compositions were premiered in New York, including his Suite for Unaccompanied Cello and an Oboe Quintet. From 1963 to 1972 he wrote music criticism for The New York Times where he was a champion of new music. He died of leukemia at St. Joseph's Hospital in Asheville, North Carolina in 1998 at the age of 79.

== Sources ==
- Allan Kozinn (December 3, 1998). "Theodore Strongin, 79, a Critic; Championed Contemporary Music". The New York Times.
