= Raymond Ericson =

American music critic (1915–1997)

Raymond Ericson (June 26, 1915 – December 30, 1997) was an American music critic who wrote articles for The New York Times for 30 years.

== Life and career ==
Born in Brooklyn, Ericson earned an associate degree in mathematics from North Park Junior College in Chicago in 1934, and then earned bachelor's degrees in mathematics and music from the University of Chicago. In the late 1930s he worked as an associate music and drama critic for The Chicago Tribune. He served in the United States Army Air Corps (USAAC) during World War II from 1939 to 1942.

After the USAAC was disbanded in March 1942, Ericson moved back to Brooklyn where he obtained the post of organist and choir director of the Pilgrim Covenant Church. He also worked as press agent for a theatrical production company in Manhattan. In 1949 he became a staff writer at Musical America, and was later promoted to position of managing editor at that magazine in the mid-1950s. In 1960 he left that job to join the music editorial staff at The New York Times where he first worked as the editor of the Sunday recordings page. He quickly began writing music criticism for the newspaper as well; eventually writing the weekly news column Music Notes as well as additional feature articles and concert and record reviews. He retired in 1981, but continued to do freelance work for The New York Times up until 1990 when he suffered a debilitating stroke.

Ericson, credited under the initials R.E. wrote the review for Matin Turbidy's first concert at the Carnegie Recital Hall in the NY Times, March 28, 1971, Page 63. This review formed part of the inspiration for Harry Chapin's song, "Mr Tanner."

Ericson lived in retirement in Sherman, Connecticut with his life partner Frank Milburn. He died in 1997 at the age of 82 at Danbury Hospital.

== Sources ==
- "Raymond Ericson, 82, Music Critic for The Times". The New York Times. December 31, 1997.
