= Carl Schurz Park =

Public park in Manhattan, New York

Coordinates: 40°46′31″N 73°56′37″W

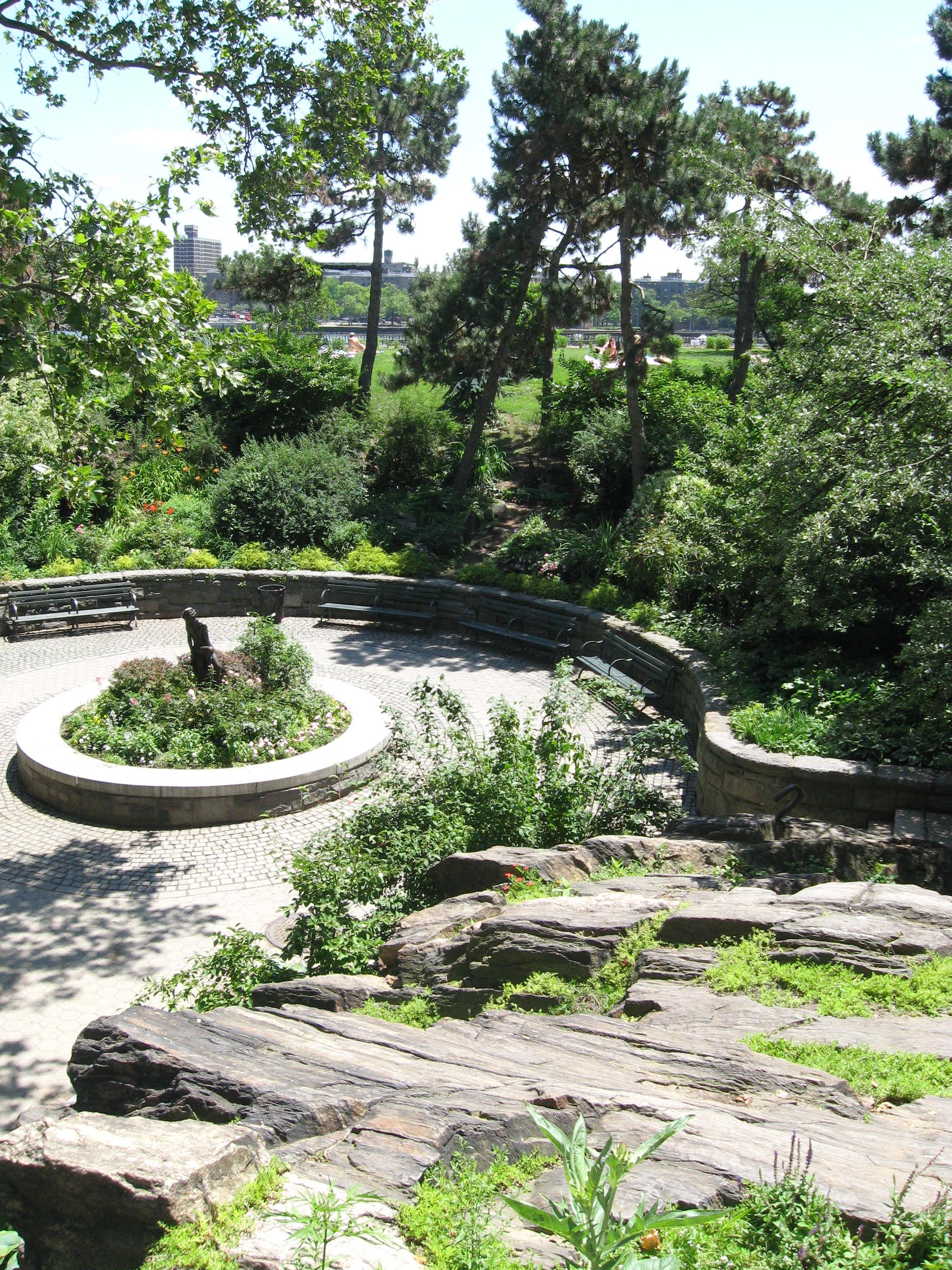
Peter Pan statue in park plaza

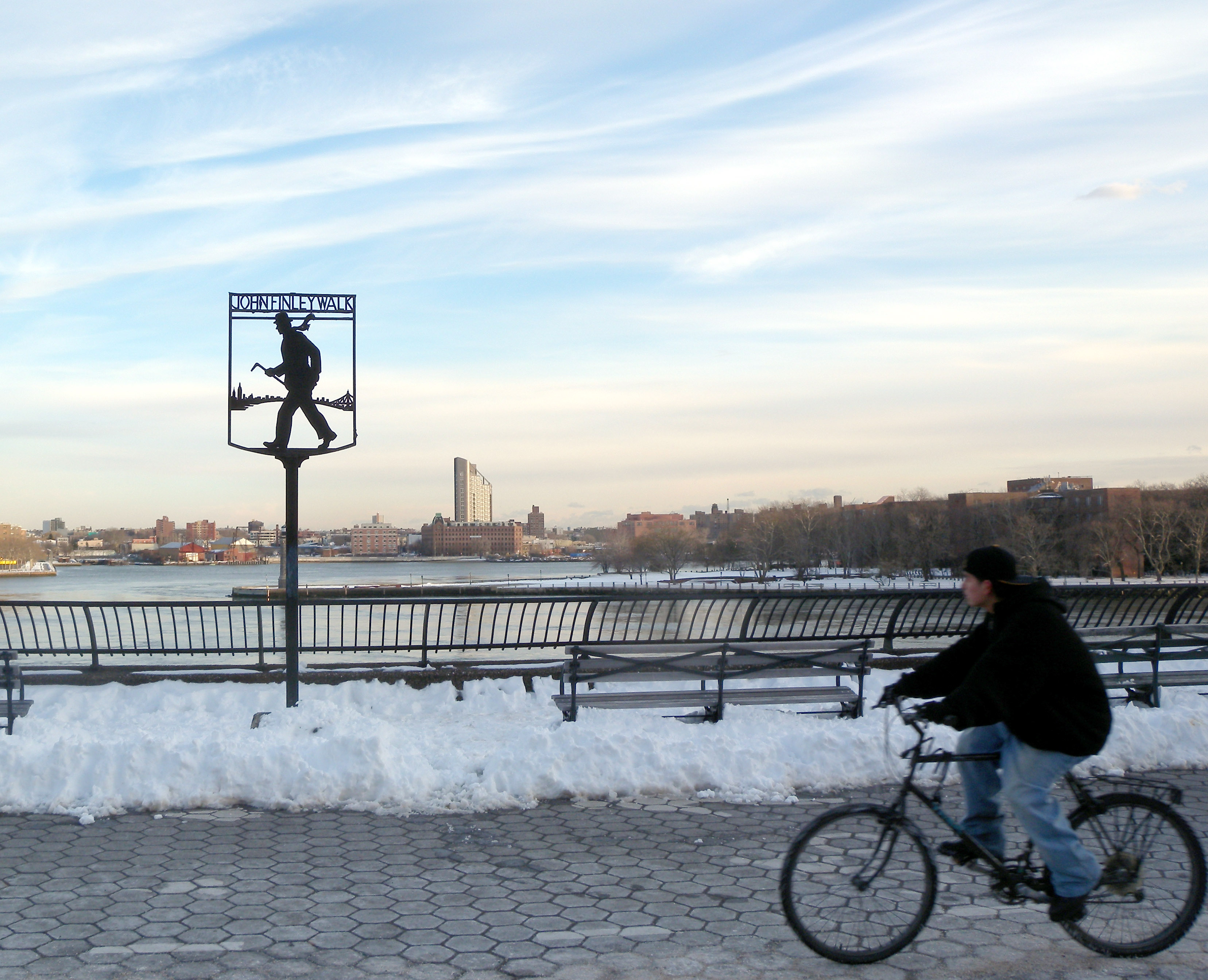
John Finley Walk, a promenade named after John Huston Finley, provides a path for bicycles.

Carl Schurz Park /ʃʊrts/ is a 14.9-acre (6.0 ha) public park in the Yorkville neighborhood of Manhattan, New York City, named for German-born Secretary of the Interior Carl Schurz in 1910, at the edge of what was then the solidly German-American community of Yorkville. The park contains Gracie Mansion, the official residence of the Mayor of New York.

== Description ==
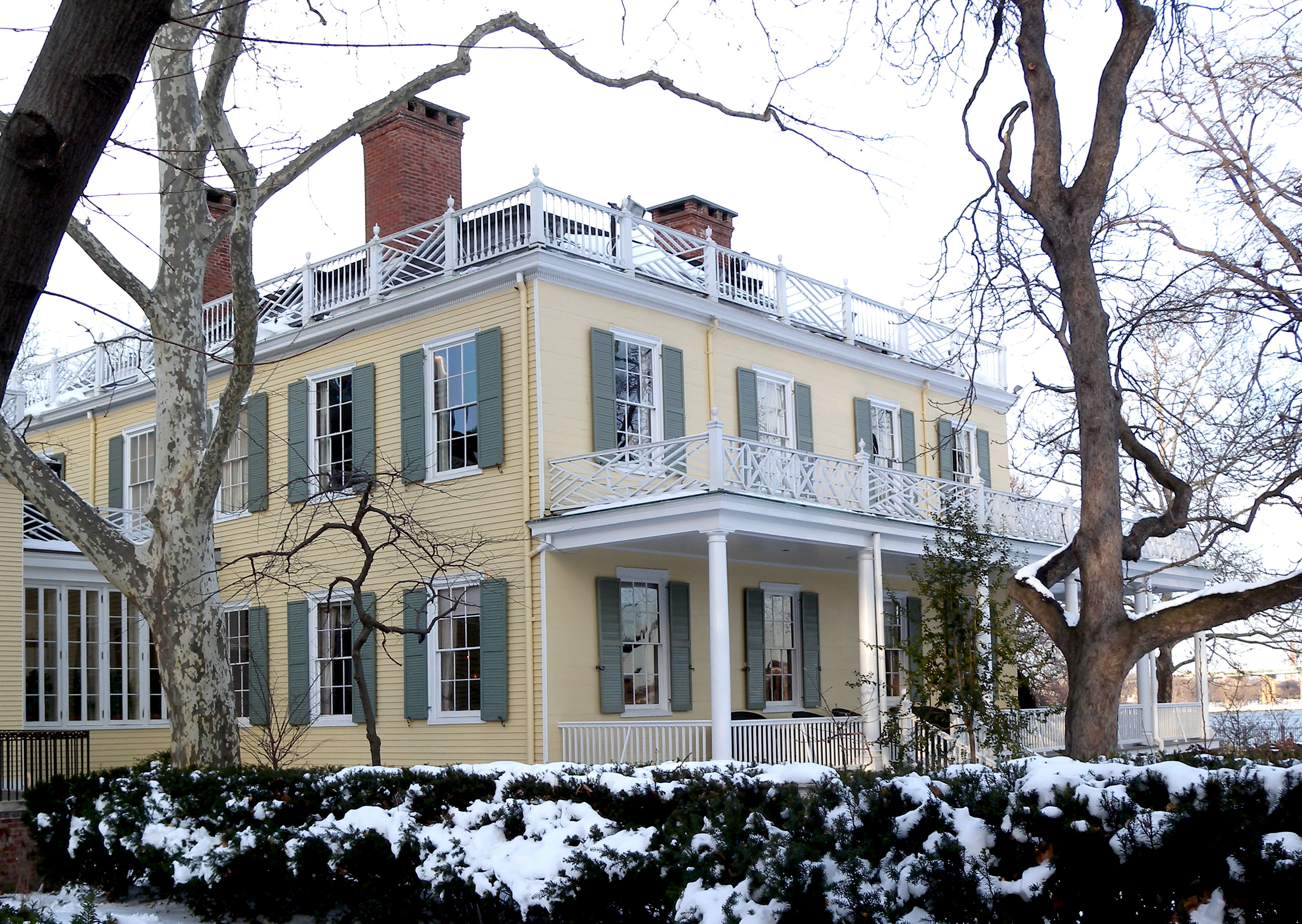
Gracie Mansion, the official residence of the New York City mayor

Carl Schurz Park overlooks the waters of Hell Gate and Wards Island in the East River, and is the site of Gracie Mansion (built for Archibald Gracie, 1799, enlarged c. 1811), the official residence of the Mayor of New York since 1942. There are tours of the restored building every Monday and Wednesday. The park's waterfront promenade is a deck built over the Franklin D. Roosevelt East River Drive, enclosing the roadway except on the side facing the East River. The park is bordered on the west by East End Avenue and on the south by Gracie Square, the extension of East 84th Street to the river. The East River Greenway, part of the Manhattan Waterfront Greenway, passes along the promenade platform.

The park contains winding, shady paths, green lawns, waterfront views, pickleball courts, basketball courts, a large playground for children, and two dog runs: one designated for larger dogs and one for smaller dogs. The park is maintained by Carl Schurz Park Conservancy, the oldest park conservancy in New York City, in partnership with the New York City Department of Parks and Recreation.

== History ==
The bluff overlooking a curve in the East River at this point was named in 1646 by first recorded owner, Siebert Classen, "Hoorn's Hook", for his native Hoorn on the Zuider Zee. (Note: The account of the site's history is from The WPA Guide to New York City, (1939, 1982; p. 250f).) The first house on the site was built for Jacob Walton, a few years before the Revolution, when the picturesque location suddenly gained tactical importance in the control of the East River. In February 1776, the house and grounds were commandeered for an American battery of nine guns on the site. (Note: This was one of a series of unconnected small batteries along the East River.) This drew British fire on September 15, 1776, in a mopping-up operation to secure all of Manhattan Island following the Battle of Long Island; the bombardment demolished Walton's house and forced an American withdrawal. The British kept an encampment on the site until Evacuation Day, 1783. Archibald Gracie leveled the remains of the star fort and constructed his timber-framed villa Gracie Mansion in 1799.

The section of the park lying south of 86th Street (set aside as "East River Park" in 1876), where John Jacob Astor once had a villa, was used as a picnic ground when the northern section was acquired by the City of New York in 1891. (Note: So called in Frank Bergen Kelley and Edward Hagaman Hall Historical Guide to the City of New York (City History Club of New York) 190, p.135, where Astor's villa is mentioned.) The easternmost block of 86th Street was acquired subsequently, and the street de-mapped. A new landscape design by Calvert Vaux and Samuel Parsons was completed in 1902, several years after Vaux's death.

East River Park was renamed Carl Schurz Park in 1911. The park was reconstructed in 1935 by Robert Moses, due to the creation of the FDR Drive, with revised landscaping by Maud Sargent. The park's restoration from a neglected state in the early 1970s was due to the energies of a neighborhood group, the not-for-profit Carl Schurz Park Conservancy (incorporated 1974), formed originally to clean up the park's single playground.

Carl Schurz Park served as the location for the climactic fight scene in Spike Lee's 2002 film 25th Hour, starring Edward Norton and Philip Seymour Hoffman.
