= Pietà (disambiguation) =

The Pietà is a subject in Christian art depicting the Virgin Mary cradling the dead body of Jesus.

Pietà, Pieta, Pietas or Pietàs may also refer to:

== Paintings ==
- Pietà (Titian), a painting by Titian
- Pietà (Filippo Lippi, Florence), a 1430–1435 painting by Filippo Lippi
- Pietà (Filippo Lippi, Milan), a 1437–1439 painting by Filippo Lippi
- Pietà (Annibale Carracci), a c.1600 oil on canvas painting by Annibale Carracci
- Pietà (Bellini, Milan), a c.1455-1460 tempera on panel painting by Giovanni Bellini
- Pietà (El Greco), a 1571-1576 painting by El Greco
- Pietà (Lotto), a 1545 oil on canvas painting by Lorenzo Lotto,
- Pietà (Ribera, Naples), a 1637 painting by Jusepe de Ribera
- Pietà (Flandrin), a c. 1842 painting by Hippolyte Flandrin

== Sculptures ==
- Pietà (Southern German, Cloisters), a German wooden sculpture
- Pietà (Michelangelo), a marble sculpture
- Pietà (Meštrović), Croatian marble statue

== Screen works ==
- Pieta (1987 film), an Australian television film
- Pieta (TV series), a 2008 Philippine TV series
- Pietà (film), a 2012 South Korean film
- Pieta, a 1983 Filipino film written and directed by Carlo J. Caparas

== Locations ==
- Pieta, California
- Pietà, Malta

== Other uses ==
- Pietas, a virtue in the ancient Roman religious system
- Pietà (manga), a 1998 Japanese josei manga
- Pietà (book), a 1989 book by George Klein
- Pieta Brown (born 1973), American musician.
- Pietas Comunità Gentile, a neopagan Roman-Italic religious association

== See also ==
- della Pietà, a surname
- Ospedale della Pietà, an orphanage and music school
- Pieta House, a suicide prevention charity in Ireland
- Pieta prayer booklet, a Catholic prayer book approved by Pope Pius IX
- Santa Maria della Pietà, Venice, a church
