= Vincenta Da Ponte =

Italian composer, singer and instrumentalist

Vincenta da Ponte (fl. second half of the 18th century) was an Italian composer, singer and instrumentalist. She was a member of the coro, or music school, of Venice's Ospedale della Pietà during the tenure of it:Bonaventura Furlanetto as music director. Her origins are unknown, but her surname indicates that she was a member of a patrician family and not a foundling, as were most of the Ospidale's students; consequently, she would have been a tuition-paying student, or would have been awarded a scholarship.

As a composer, Da Ponte is known only from an unpublished set of four dances included in a collection of monferrine and composed around 1775; the manuscript is held in the Conservatorio di Musica Benedetto Marcello in Venice.

Da Ponte is one of five composers known to have emerged from the coro of the Ospedale; the others include Anna Bon and the foundlings Agata, Michielina, and Santa della Pietà.
