= Della Pietà =

della Pietà is an Italian surname, and may refer to:

- Agata della Pietà (circa 1800), Italian composer, singer, and teacher
- Michielina della Pietà (circa 1700), Italian composer, violinist, organist, and teacher
- Santa della Pietà (circa 1725–1774), Italian singer, composer, and violinist
- Anna Maria della Pietà (circa 1696–1782), Italian violinist, composer, and teacher
- Chiara della Pietà (1718–1791), Italian violinist, composer, and teacher
