= Santa Maria della Visitazione =

Santa Maria della Visitazione may be:

- An alternative name for Santa Maria in Aquiro, Rome
- Santa Maria della Visitazione: church in Venice, also known as Santa Maria della Pietà.
- A former name of the church of the Gesuati, formally Santa Maria del Rosario, in Venice.
- Santa Maria della Visitazione al Ponte delle Lame, Bologna
