= Supper in the House of Simon the Pharisee =

Supper in the House of Simon the Pharisee may refer to:

- Feast in the House of Simon the Pharisee (Rubens)
- Supper in the House of Simon the Pharisee (Moretto)
