= Ospedale della Pietà =

Convent, orphanage, and music school in Venice

Coordinates: 45.4341°N 12.3446°E

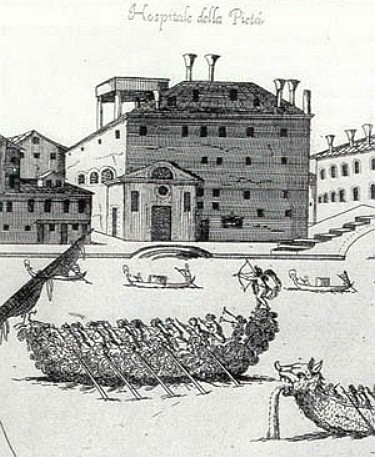
Ospedale della Pietà

The Ospedale della Pietà was a convent, orphanage, and music school in Venice. Like other Venetian ospedali, the Pietà was first established as a hospice for the needy. A group of Venetian nuns, called the Consorelle di Santa Maria dell’Umiltà, established this charitable institution for orphans and abandoned girls in the fourteenth century.

By the seventeenth and eighteenth centuries the Pietà – along with the three other charitable Ospedali Grandi – was well known for its all-female musical ensembles that attracted tourists and patrons from around Europe.

Its fame is largely connected to its resident composer and violin teacher Antonio Vivaldi, who was also a Catholic priest.

== Musical activity ==
Infants could be left at the Pietà via the scaffetta, a window only large enough to admit infants. Not all infants were female, nor were they necessarily orphans. Through the seventeenth century all four of the surviving ospedali gained increasing attention through the performances of sacred music by their female musicians, known as figlie di coro. Formal rules for the training of figlie were carefully drafted and periodically revised. Many of these concerts were given for select audiences consisting of important visitors. The audience was separated from the performers by a metal grill, following the example of convents to protect the women from the gaze of the visitors. As the institution became celebrated, it sometimes received infants related (not always legitimately) to members of the nobility. In the later decades of the Venetian Republic, which collapsed in 1797, it also accepted adolescent music students – called figlie di spese – whose fees were paid by sponsoring foreign courts or dignitaries.

The Pietà produced many virtuose like the violinist Chiara della Pietà and the soprano vocalist Fortunata Cantora, as well as composers, such as Agata della Pietà, and at least two composers who made careers outside of the institutions: Anna Bon and Vincenta Da Ponte. The life of successful figlie was much coveted. Some were given lavish gifts by admirers, and many were offered periods of vacation in villas on the Italian mainland. Most remained there their entire lives, though as the Venetian economy declined in the eighteenth century, some left to make (usually advantageous) marriages. In this instance, the institution provided a future bride with a small dowry.

Each Ospedale Grande usually had an orchestra of at least thirty to forty musicians (La Pietà's orchestra counted up to sixty), all females, and the institutions competed with each other by hiring the best musicians in the city, promoting high quality concerts. Through such activities. they provided countless commissions for violin and other instruments makers to provide for the maintenance and repair of such instruments. These artisans were named "liuter del loco". The office of "liuter del loco" guaranteed a constant flow of income: curating the instruments of an entire orchestra was a burdensome activity which required the work of more than one person; instruments had to be picked up, continuously repaired because of breakage and ungluing from use, and sometimes instruments had to be built. The responsible violin maker also had to supply strings for the entire orchestra, keep an accounting book detailing all operations, and issue semi-annual or annual invoices. These invoices, or ‘policies’ as they were called at the time, were handwritten by the appointed violin maker and had to be approved by the "maestre del coro" or the maestro di cappella – who would usually be granted a discount – before being paid by the hospital administration. These ‘policies’ are not only a precious source of information for the study of an author (luthier) and his work, but they are also a valid tool to gather more information on the musical practice of the "sonadori" (players) of the time. There is also much information that can be gleaned from their organological study. For a reading of some of the most interesting invoices, we refer to the appendix of the book by Pio where some of them (the author has found and catalogued more than 110, totaling 400 pages) are listed in chronological order and cover the years from 1750 to 1810.

The composer Antonio Vivaldi was appointed a violin teacher in 1703 and served in various roles through 1715, and again from 1723 to 1740. Much of Vivaldi's sacred vocal and instrumental music was written for performance at the Pietà. The conservatory of the Pietà hospital was the only hospital to remain active until approximately 1830. All the other hospitals completely closed their musical activity during the first years of the nineteenth century. From an instrument inventory dated 1790 we learn that during that year the Pietà hospital had still “four violins with used bows, four cellos, seventeen violins, two marine trumpets (these may have been violini in tromba marina), six small violas, two viola d’amore, two mandolines, two lutes, one theorbo, four hunting horns with accessories, two psalteries with harmonic box, two cymbals, three flutes, two big cymbals with spinets, six spinets".

Jean-Jacques Rousseau's account of 1770 conveys his impressions but has been over-generalized as a description of the institution over an entire century. After describing how the performers were hidden behind metal grilles, he related in his Confessions (1770):

I have not an idea of anything so voluptuous and affecting as this music; the richness of the art, the exquisite taste of the vocal part, the excellence of the voices, the justness of the execution, everything in these delightful concerts concurs to produce an impression which certainly is not the mode, but from which I am of opinion no heart is secure.

He goes on to describe meeting the musicians.

The original building (shown above) is currently a hotel-restaurant complex (the Metropole). The nearby church of the Pietà was completed in 1761, two decades after the death of Vivaldi. The facade of the church was only completed in the early 20th century. An early childhood education center is still housed in the rear of the building complex behind the church. Most of this complex was donated to the Ospedale in the 1720s, enabling it to expand its activities. Some of Vivaldi's premiere pupils, such as Anna Maria del Violino, were given individual rooms in these newly acquired buildings. It is possible that in the salon of one of them the famous concert for "i conti del Nord", celebrated in a painting by Francesco Guardi, took place on January 22, 1782. Guardi's painting is mistitled "The Dinner and Ball in the Teatro San Benedetto".

Gala Concert in Old Procuratory for Czar's Daughter-in-Law (1780) by Guardi.

== Musicians who studied in the Ospedale ==
- Chiara della Pietà
- Anna Maria della Pietà
- Michielina della Pietà
- Santa della Pietà
- Agata della Pietà
- Fortunata Cantora
- Vincenta Da Ponte
- Anna Bon
- Maddalena Laura Sirmen (at the Mendicanti)
- Regina Strinasacchi
- Candida della Pietà

== List of music teachers ==
=== Maestri di coro ===
- Antonio Gualtieri (1633-1649)
- Johann Rosenmüller (1658-1677)
- Giacomo Spada (1677-1701)
- Francesco Gasparini (1701-1713)
- Carlo Luigi Pietragrua (1719-1726)
- Giovanni Porta (1726-1737)
- Gennaro D'Alessandro (1739-1740)
- Nicola Porpora (1742-1743)
- Andrea Bernasconi (1744-1753)
- Gaetano Latilla (1753-1766)
- Giuseppe Sarti (1766-1768)
- Bonaventura Furlanetto (1768-1817)
- Giovanni Agostino Perotti (1817-1828)

=== Maestri di canto, di maniera and di solfeggio ===
- Pietro Scarpari (1713-1742)
- Pietro Cesti (1722-1726)
- Paolo Bonamici (1726-1730)
- Girolamo Bassani (1730-1741)
- Domenico Valentini (1747-1760)
- Domenico Negri (1760-1767)
- Lorenzo Duodo (1767-1768)
- Gabriel Piozzi (1768)
- Ferdinando Pasini (1768-1769)
- Matteo Buini (1769-1771)
- Ferdinando Pasini (1771-1774)
- Pietro De Mezzo (1774)
- Ferdinando Pasini (1775-1809)
- Ruggero Ermagora Fabio (1809-1829)

=== Recorder, flute and oboe masters ===
- Onofrio Penati (1704)
- Ignazio Rion (1704)
- Ludwig Erdmann (1706-1713)
- Ignazio Sieber (1713-1716; 1728-1757)
- Onofrio Penati (1716-1727), also as maestro dei concerti
- Ignazio Sieber (1728-1757)
- Pietro Fruttel (1757-1781)

=== Horn masters ===
- Francesco Lanari (1747-1751)
- Lorenzo Rossoni (1751-1760)
- Giacomo Molteni (1762-1765)
- Antonio Lodi (1765-1782)

=== Timpani masters ===
- Lorenzo Crux (1751)

=== Salterio masters ===
- Fulgenzio Perotti (1760-1764)

=== Violin masters ===
- Antonio Vivaldi (1703-1717; 1735-1738), also as maestro di viola all'inglese and dei concerti
- Lorenzo Carminati (1744-1747)
- Lorenzo Morini (1750-1751), also as maestro dei concerti
- Francesco Negri (1765-1770)
- Antonio Nazari (1770-1775)
- Alessandro Da Ponte (1775-1782)

=== Viola masters ===
- Bernardo Aliprandi (1722-1731)

=== Cello masters ===
- Antonio Vandini (1720-1722)
- Antonio Martinelli (1750-1782)

== References in fiction ==
- Vivaldi's Virgins, first published in 2007 and translated into 12 languages, is a novel by Barbara Quick set in the Ospedale della Pietà during the lifetime of Anna Maria della Pietà, one of Vivaldi's favorite students there. The novel was released as an audio title in December 2019.
- The Ospedale della Pieta is the main setting of Rosalind Laker's (pen name of Barbara Ovstedal) The Venetian Mask (1992)
- Corona, L. (4 November 2008). The Four Seasons: A Novel of Vivaldi's Venice. Hachette Books. ISBN 9781401395377. (2008) is a romanticized history of the women who were abandoned and studied in the Ospedale della Pietà.
- Vivaldi's Ring of Mystery is a play and audiobook by Classical Kids. The protagonist, known simply as Katarina attends the Ospedale della Pietà and finds herself looking for clues about a violin belonging to the Duke of Cremona. The work won the Juno Award for Children's Album of the Year at the Juno Awards of 1992.
- Maddalena and the Dark, published in 2023, is a novel by Julia Fine that follows two girls living and studying at the Ospedale della Pietà in the early 1700s.
- The Instrumentalist, published in 2024, is a novel by Harriet Constable that is inspired by the true story of Anna Maria Della Pietà. According to the author's bio, it was selected as one of the top ten debuts of 2024 by the Guardian newspaper.
- Primavera (2025), a French-Italian film directed by Damiano Michieletto focused on Vivaldi's early time at the Ospedale della Pietà.

== Bibliography ==
- Jane L. Baldauf-Berdes: Women Musicians of Venice. Musical Foundations, 1525–1855. Rev. ed. Oxford 1996; ISBN 0-19-816604-4
- Fernyhough, Clare (12 February 2006). "Revealed: Vivaldi's life with a whole orchestra of women". Independent on Sunday (UK national title). p. 32. Archived from the original on February 5, 2011.
- André Romijn. Hidden Harmonies: The Secret Life of Antonio Vivaldi (2008); ISBN 978-0-9554100-1-7
- Eleanor Selfridge-Field. A New Chronology of Venetian Opera and Related Genres, 1660–1760 (2007); ISBN 978-0-8047-4437-9
- E. Selfridge-Field. Venetian Instrumental Music from Gabrieli to Vivaldi, 3rd rev. edn., 1994; ISBN 0-486-28151-5
- E. Selfridge-Field. Pallade Veneta: Writings on Music in Venetian Society, 1650–1750. Venice (1985); ISBN 9788875520069
- Vivaldi's Violins: the Accounts of Ospedale della Pietà; accessed 20 February 2006; archived from the original on 2006-12-05.
- Vanessa Tonelli "Le Figlie di Coro: Women's Musical Education and Performance at the Venetian Ospedali Maggiori." PhD Dissertation. Northwestern University, 2022.
- Vanessa Tonelli. "Women and music in the Venetian Ospedali." Thesis. Michigan State University 2013.
