= Antonio Vandini =

Italian composer

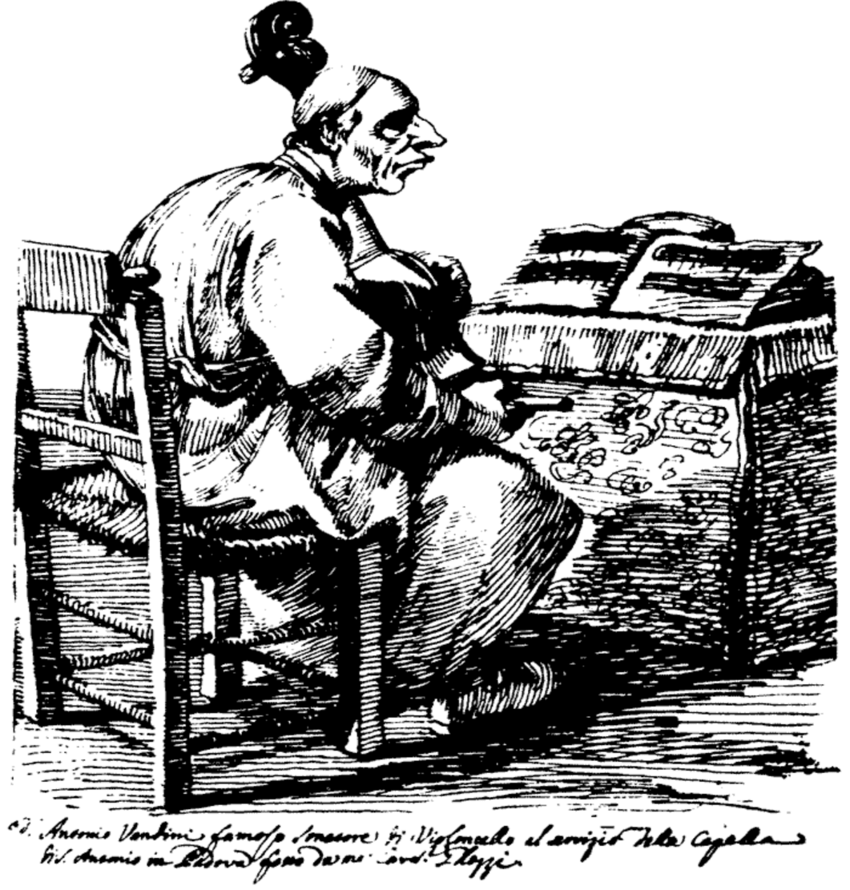
Antonio Vandini

Antonio Vandini (1691 – 1778), a close friend of Giuseppe Tartini, was a cellist and composer. He was an eighteenth-century cellist and composer known for his performances in northern Italy. and spent most of his career as first violoncellist of the “Veneranda Arca” at the Basilica del Santo in Padua, where Tartini served as first violinist and concertmaster. Upon the death of Tartini, he returned to Bologna, the city of his birth, where he died in 1778.

== Career ==
Vandini was born in 1691 in Bologna, though next to nothing is known about his early life or musical training. His first documented playing position is at the church of Santa Maria Maggiore in Bergamo which he obtained in April of 1720. Concurrently he was also Maestro di violoncello at the Ospedale della Pietà in Venice. (Note: Bergamo and Venice are far enough apart that it would have been very difficult for him to fulfill both of these positions!) During this period he was almost certainly performing extensively throughout northern Italy. In June of 1721 he obtained the solo cello position in Padua which he would hold, with a few short hiatuses, for the rest of his career. In Padua he worked with a number of other notable musicians in addition to Tartini, including the Oboist Matteo Bissoli and the organist and Maestro di capella Antonio Vallotti. The principal players of the Veneranda Arca toured Italy regularly, making documented appearances in Assisi and Rome. His only prolonged absence was a three year period from 1723 to 1726 where Vandini, along with Tartini, left Padua to join the service of Count Kinsky in Prague.

== Playing Style ==
The English traveler and musical critic Charles Burney attended a mass at the Basilica in Padua in 1770. He wrote the following about the orchestra there and Vandini in particular:

″I wanted much to hear [...] the famous old Antonio Vandini, on the violoncello, who, the Italians say, plays and expresses a parlare, that is, in such a manner as to make his instrument speak; but neither of these performers had solo parts. However, I give them credit for great abilities, as they are highly extolled by their countrymen, who must, by the frequent hearing of excellent performers of all kinds, insensibly become good judges of musical merit. [...] It was remarkable that Antonio [Vandini], and all the other violoncello players here, hold the bow in the old-fashioned way, with the hand under it.”

Through Burney's anonymous informers it is clear that Vandini was well known for his expressive, rhetorical playing that evoked speech. By examining his seven surviving works and the concertos written for him by Tartini it is clear that he had formidable technical ability, being one of the first composers to write music requiring the use of thumb position.

== Works ==
Vandini has seven surviving works, all of which are preserved in manuscript copies throughout Europe, namely in Venice, Berlin, Paris, and Schwerin. All of these pieces are written in the galant style, popular in Italy in the eighteenth century. Notably, the two short sonatas attributed to Vandini by Carl Schroeder in 1911 and published by Schott are completely spurious and do not represent his style.

A full list of his works is below with the catalogue numbers proposed by Elinor Frey and Marc Vanscheeuwijk. (Note: A recording of the complete authentic works featuring Canadian cellist Elinor Frey is available on the Passacaille record label.)

Sonata à Violoncello solo del Signor D. Antonio Vandini, in C Major (1717, I-Vnm, Mss. It.IV.1095) (Van. 1)

Sonata del Signor D. Antonio Vandini, in C Major (D-B, KHM 5528) (Van. 2)

[Sonata] Del Signor D. Antonio Vandini, in B-flat Major (1730, F-Pn, VM7-6285) (Van. 3)

[Sonata] Del Signor D. Antonio Vandini, in A Minor (1730, F-Pn, VM7-6285) (Van. 4)

Concerto del Signor D. Antonio Vandini, in D Major (D-SWI Mus. 4736/4) (Van.5)

Sonata à Violoncello Del Signor D. Antonio Vandini, in B-flat Major (D-B, KHM 5527) (Van. 6)

Sonata a Violoncello e Basso del Signor D. Antonio Vandini, in E Major (D-B, KHM 5529) (Van. 7)
