= Michielina della Pietà =

Italian composer

Michielina (also known as Michaelis or Michieletta) della Pietà (fl. ca. 1700 – 1744) was an Italian composer, violinist, organist, and teacher of music.

A foundling admitted in infancy to the Ospedale della Pietà in Venice, della Pietà received a thorough musical education from early childhood in the convent's coro, or music school; she became its principal organist and was active as a violinist in the orchestra. As a composer, she was active during the tenures of Francesco Gasparini, Giovanni Porta, Gennaro D'Alessandro, Nicola Porpora, and Andrea Bernasconi as heads of the school; she was further licensed to teach in 1726. She is known to have composed a litany for the Feast of the Nativity in 1740, and to have written a setting of the hymn Pange lingua in 1741. Nothing further is known of her activities or her life.

Along with Agata and Santa della Pietà, della Pietà was one of three foundlings of the Ospedale to become a composer later in life.
