= Elinor Frey =

Canadian-American cellist

- Born: August 23, 1979 (age 46); Seattle, Washington, U.S.
- Education: McGill University, Juilliard School, Mannes School of Music
- Occupations: Baroque cellist, musicologist
- Website: elinorfrey.com

Elinor Frey (born August 23, 1979) is a Canadian-American cellist, specializing in music of the eighteenth century. She specializes in the music of underperformed composers from the later part of the baroque era, and has recorded this repertoire on the Passacaille label. In addition to her main focus on early music, she has a background in contemporary music, and has commissioned new works for the baroque cello, recording several of them.

== Biography ==
Elinor Frey was born in Seattle, Washington, and started playing the cello at a young age. She was exposed to early music from an early age by listening to recordings of her aunt, the pioneering vocalist Barbara Thornton. She pursued studies in cello performance at the Mannes School of Music and Juilliard with an emphasis on new music. Her first solo recording (a recital of contemporary cello music with pianist David Fung) dates from this portion of her career. In 2008, she moved to Montreal, where she still resides, to begin a doctorate at the Schulich School of Music at McGill University. She began to work extensively in the field of historical performance, receiving a Fulbright to study baroque cello in Como, Italy for a year with Paolo Beschi.

Frey was a founding member of the ensemble Pallade Musica (winners of the Early Music America Performance Competition in 2012). She now leads the Accademia dei Dissonanti, an organization for performance and research. She maintains a busy performance schedule, concertizing and recording across Canada, the US and Europe. She made her Australian debut in 2023, playing concertos with the Brandenburg Orchestra. Her extensive discography, of largely unknown repertoire, on the Passacaille and Analekta record labels, has won several prizes and critical acclaim. In addition to recording, she has also made critical editions of the complete cello music of Giuseppe Clemente Dall'Abaco and Antonio Vandini.

She is on the faculty of the Schulich School of Music at McGill University and the Université de Montréal, teaching baroque cello and performance practice.

== Awards and honors ==
- 2016 - Prix Opus: Disque de l’année (Musiques Médiévale, de la renaissance, Baroque), "Berlin Sonatas"
- 2020 - Diapason d'Or for "Giuseppe Clemente Dall'Abaco Cello Sonatas"
- 2021 - Prix Opus: "Performer of the Year" 2019-2020
- 2023 - Juno Award: Classical Album of the Year (small ensemble) for Early Italian Cello Concertos
- 2024 - Prix Opus: Disque de l’année (Musiques Médiévale, de la renaissance, Baroque), for "Jean Baur: Chamber Music"

== Discography ==
=== As featured soloist ===
- 2008 - "Dialoghi" with David Fung Piano. Yarlung Records.
- 2013 - "La Voce del Violoncello" with Esteban La Rotta and Susie Napper. Passacaille Records
- 2016 - "Berlin Sonatas" with Lorenzo Ghielmi and Marc Vanscheeuwijck. Passacaille Records
- 2017 - "Angelo Maria Fiorè" with Susie LeBlanc, Lorenzo Ghielmi and Esteban La Rotta. Passacaille Records
- 2019 - "Guided by Voices" with Melisande McNabney. Analekta Records
- 2020 - "Giuseppe Clemente Dall'Abaco Cello Sonatas" with Marco Valli, Federica Bianchi, and Giangiacomo Pinardi. Passacaille Records
- 2021 - "Antonio Vandini: Complete Works" with Marc Vanscheeuwijck, Federica Bianchi and Patxi Montero. Passacaille Records
- 2022 - "Early Italian Cello Concertos" with Rosa Barocca, Claude Lapalme dir. Analekta Records
- 2022 - "The Cello According to Dall'Abaco" with Catherine Jones, Federica Bianchi and Michele Pasotti. Passacaille Records
- 2023 - "Jean Bauer Chamber Music" with Antoine Malette-Chénier, Mélisande McNabney, Octavie Dostaller-Lalonde. Passacaille Records
- 2024 - "Dall'Abaco and the Art of Variation" with Federica Bianchi, Michele Pasotti, Eva Lymenstull, and Octavie Dostaller-Lalonde. Passacaille Records

=== Other credits ===
- 2014 - "Back Venezia" with Pallade Musica. ATMA Classique
- 2017 - "Trio Sonatas - Shieferlien, CPE Bach, and Telemann" with Pallade Musica. ATMA Classique
- 2018 - "Fauré, Duruflé Requiem" Choir of the Church of St. Andrew and St. Paul dir Jean-Sébasitien Vallée ATMA Classique
- 2022 - "Magnificat Fugues" with Space Time Continuo. Analekta Records.
- 2021 - "Distance" Choir of the Church of St. Andrew and St. Paul dir Jean-Sébasitien Vallée ATMA Classique
- 2023 - "Lovers and Mourners" with Dorian Bandy and Hank Knox. Leaf Music

== Publications ==
- Frey, Elinor. 2012. “We Are All (Baroque) Cellists Now : Baroque and Modern Italian Solo Cello Music in Direct Dialogue.” Dissertation, Montreal: McGill University.
- Frey, Elinor. 2017. “Sonatas for Violoncello and Arias with Obbligato Violoncello : From the Como Manuscript I-COc, 2808 Autori Vari (XVII-XVIII Sec.); Edited by Elinor Frey.” Albese con Cassano: Musedita.
- Frey, Elinor. 2018. “On Commissioning New Music for Baroque Cello.” Circuit 28 (2): 11–23. https://doi.org/10.7202/1051289ar.
- Frey, Elinor, ed. 2020. “6 Sonate Manoscritte per Violoncello E B.C., Ms. I-Vnm, D-B, F-PN.” Albese con Cassano: Musedita.
- Frey, Elinor, ed. 2020. “35 Sonaten FüR Violoncello Und Basso Continuo. Band IV, 8 Sonaten (ABV 32 - ABV 39).” Magdeburg: Walhall.
- Frey, Elinor, ed. 2020. “35 Sonaten FüR Violoncello Und Basso Continuo. Band V, 7 Sonaten (ABV 40 - 46 ).” Magdeburg: Edition Walhall.
- Elinor Frey ed. 2021. “35 Sonaten FüR Violoncello Und Basso Continuo--Band III - 8 Sonaten (ABV 24-31).” Magdeburg: Edition Walhall.
- Frey, Elinor, ed. 2021. “35 Sonaten Für Violoncello Und Basso Continuo. Band I, 6 Sonaten (ABV 12-17).” Magdeburg: Edition Walhall.
- Frey, Elinor, ed. 2022. “Zwei Trios ABV 54-55, Für 3 Violoncelli.” Magdeburg: Edition Walhall.
- Frey, Elinor, ed. 2022. “Drei Duette ABV 47-49, Für 2 Violoncelli.” Magdeburg: Edition Walhall.
- Frey, Elinor, ed. 2022. “35 Sonaten Für Violoncello Und Basso Continuo. Band II, 6 Sonaten (ABV 18-23).” Edited by Elinor Frey. Magdeburg: Edition Walhall.
