= Supper in the House of Simon the Pharisee (Moretto) =

Painting by Moretto da Brescia

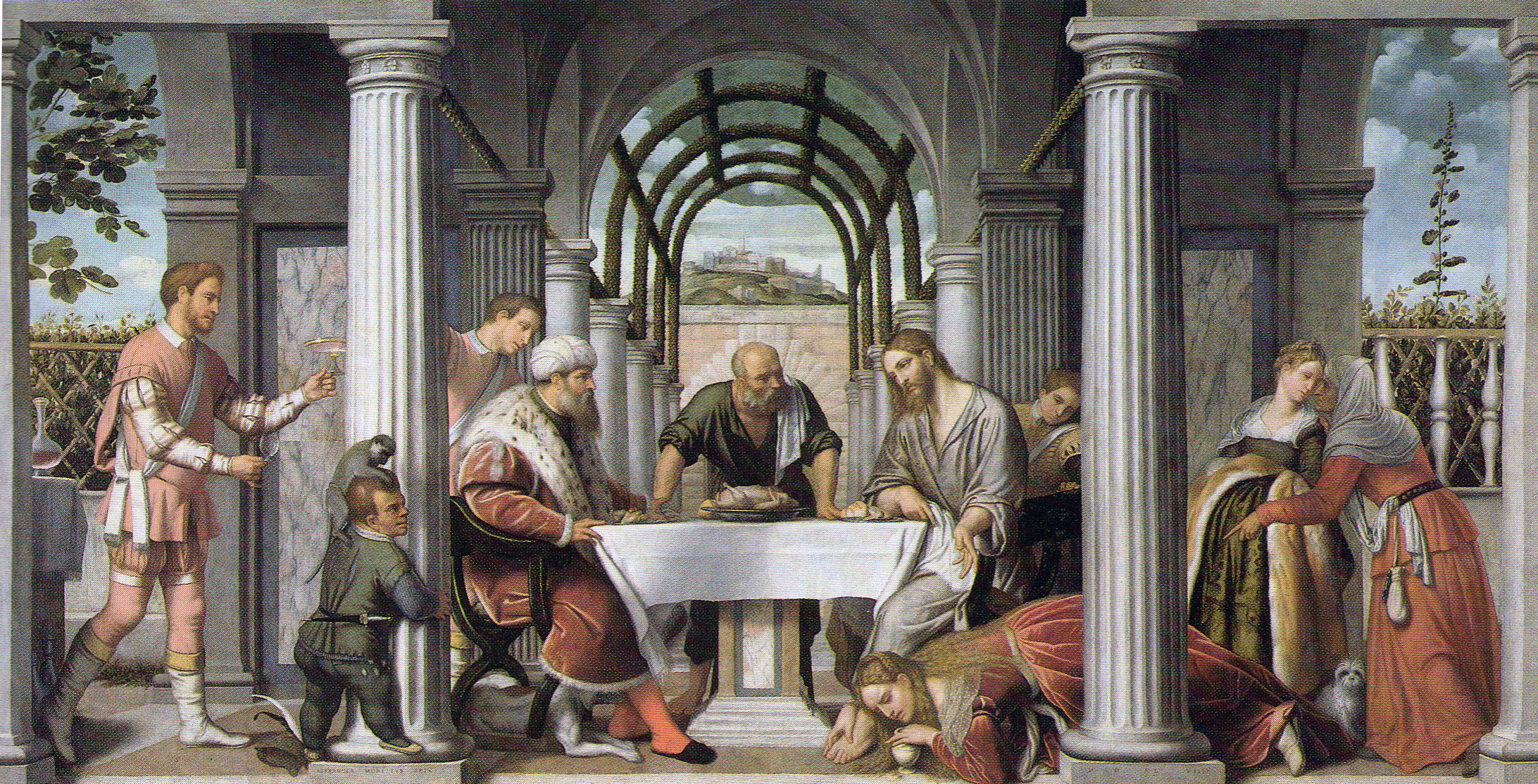
Supper in the House of Simon the Pharisee (1544) by Moretto da Brescia

Supper in the House of Simon the Pharisee is a 1544 oil on canvas painting by Moretto da Brescia, now in the Chiesa della Pietà in Venice, Italy.

It is Moretto's largest work, inspired by the Venetian school and also held by art historians to be one of the inspirations for the style of Paolo Veronese. He also included more minor details than usual in his work, probably at the request of the commissioner, the Canons Regular of San Giorgio in Alga. It was intended to hang in the refectory of their monastery of San Giacomo Maggiore on San Giorgio in Alga in the Venetian lagoon. The first record of the work (by Giacomo Filippo Tomasini in 1642) records it still hung in its original position, as did Carlo Ridolfi in 1648.

When the Canons Regular were suppressed by pope Clement IX, the painting was taken into central Venice, though its next location there is unknown. In 1771 Anton Maria Zanetti (1706-1778) wrote of seeing it in central Venice "in the ante-choir of the Spedale della Pietà", that is inside the Pio Ospedale della Pietà. In 1820 the Austrian Imperial government subsidized the painting's restoration at the Scuola Grande di Santa Maria della Carità. It stayed on display there and later joined the collection of the Gallerie dell'Accademia. In the second half of the 20th century, to remedy its unsuitable location in the Gallerie, it was moved to the city's Diocesan Museum after another restoration.

== Bibliography ==
- (in Italian) Michele Biancale, Giovanni Battista Moroni e i pittori bresciani in "L'arte", anno 17, Roma 1914
- (in Italian) Camillo Boselli, Il Moretto, 1498-1554, in "Commentari dell'Ateneo di Brescia per l'anno 1954 - Supplemento", Brescia 1954
- Joseph Archer Crowe, Giovanni Battista Cavalcaselle, A history of painting in North Italy, Londra 1871
- (in Italian) Pietro Da Ponte, L'opera del Moretto, Brescia 1898
- (in Italian) Ugo Fleres, La pinacoteca dell'Ateneo in Brescia in "Le gallerie nazionali italiane", anno 4, 1899
- (in Italian) György Gombosi, Moretto da Brescia, Basel 1943
- (in Italian) Roberto Longhi, Quesiti caravaggeschi - II, I precedenti, in "Pinacotheca", anno 1, numeri 5–6, marzo-giugno 1929
- (in Italian) Pompeo Molmenti, Il Moretto da Brescia, Firenze 1898
- Pier Virgilio Begni Redona, Alessandro Bonvicino – Il Moretto da Brescia, Editrice La Scuola, Brescia 1988
- (in Italian) Carlo Ridolfi, Le maraviglie dell'arte Ouero le vite de gl'illvstri pittori veneti, e dello stato. Oue sono raccolte le Opere insigni, i costumi, & i ritratti loro. Con la narratione delle Historie, delle Fauole, e delle Moralità da quelli dipinte, Brescia 1648
- (in Italian) Giacomo Filippo Tomasini, Annales canonicorum secularium Sancti Georgii in Alga, Venezia 1642
- (in Italian) Adolfo Venturi, Storia dell'arte italiana, volume IX, La pittura del Cinquecento, Milano 1929
- (in Italian) Anton Maria Zanetti, Della pittura veneziana e delle opere pubbliche de' veneziani maestri, Venezia 1771
