= David Fung =

Australian concert pianist (born 1983)

David Fung (born 1983) is an Australian concert pianist. His repertoire encompasses the classical piano concerto and solo recital traditions, chamber music, and contemporary works. He has performed with orchestras including the Cleveland Orchestra, Los Angeles Philharmonic, San Francisco Symphony, and Israel Philharmonic Orchestra, and has recorded for labels including Steinway & Sons, Pentatone, Genuin, Orchid Classics, Metier, ATMA Classique, Naxos, and Yarlung Records.

== Early life and education ==
Fung was born in Sydney, Australia, and attended James Ruse Agricultural High School. He received the school's medal for dux and its medal for music, and achieved a Universities Admission Index of 100. He subsequently received a scholarship to study medicine at the University of New South Wales (UNSW).

Fung began studying the violin at the age of five at Lane Cove Public School and later took up the piano at age seven. During his first year as a medical student, he won the 2002 ABC Symphony Australia Young Performers Awards. The competition culminated in his performance of Sergei Rachmaninoff's Rhapsody on a Theme of Paganini with the Sydney Symphony Orchestra at the Sydney Opera House. The award helped prompt his decision to pursue music professionally; he deferred his medical studies and moved to the United States to continue his musical education.

In 2003, Fung enrolled at the Colburn School in Los Angeles, where he studied with pianist John Perry. He became the first pianist to graduate from the Colburn Conservatory, receiving his degree in 2007. He subsequently studied at Yale University, where his teachers included Claude Frank and Peter Frankl, and continued his training with Arie Vardi at the Hochschule für Musik, Theater und Medien Hannover in Germany.

Fung has also received artistic guidance from pianists including András Schiff, Alfred Brendel, and Leon Fleisher.

== Career ==
=== Concert performances ===
Fung's international career has included concerto appearances with orchestras in North America, Europe, Asia, and Australia. His engagements have included the Cleveland Orchestra, Detroit Symphony Orchestra, Israel Philharmonic Orchestra, Los Angeles Philharmonic, San Francisco Symphony, National Orchestra of Belgium, National Taiwan Symphony Orchestra, and New Japan Philharmonic, as well as the Sydney, Melbourne, and Queensland Symphony Orchestras.

In July 2016, Fung made his debut with the Cleveland Orchestra at the Blossom Music Festival, performing Wolfgang Amadeus Mozart’s Piano Concerto No. 21 in C major, K. 467, under conductor Michael Francis. Cleveland Classical described his playing as having "Apollonian clarity and understatement", while The Plain Dealer praised him as "an agile and alert interpreter of Mozart's crystalline note-spinning".

The following week, Fung performed Rachmaninoff's Rhapsody on a Theme of Paganini at Beijing's National Stadium as part of the Olympic Summer Festival. His subsequent orchestral engagements have included performances with the Los Angeles Philharmonic alongside pianist Yuja Wang and conductor Gustavo Dudamel, as well as appearances with the San Francisco Symphony.

As a recitalist, Fung has appeared at venues including Carnegie Hall, the Kennedy Center, the Louvre, the Gewandhaus in Leipzig, and the Wigmore Hall. His festival appearances have included the Edinburgh International Festival, Ravinia Festival, Aspen Music Festival, Caramoor, and Tippet Rise Art Center.

Fung's Edinburgh International Festival appearances attracted critical attention early in his career. Reviewing a recital at the Queen's Hall, Jonas Green of the Edinburgh Guide described him as "prodigiously talented" and praised his interpretation of works by Rachmaninoff, Maurice Ravel, and Franz Liszt.

=== Competition awards ===
Fung was a laureate of the Queen Elisabeth Competition in Brussels and the Arthur Rubinstein International Piano Master Competition in Tel Aviv. At the 2008 Arthur Rubinstein competition, he received fourth prize, as well as distinctions for chamber music and Mozart performance.

== Recordings ==
Fung's discography includes solo piano recordings, chamber music, and collaborative projects. His recordings have been released by Steinway & Sons, Yarlung Records, Naxos, Pentatone, Genuin Classics, Orchid Classics, and ATMA Classique.

=== Solo piano recordings ===
Fung's early solo albums for Yarlung Records explored repertoire spanning the Baroque, Classical, Romantic, and contemporary periods. His debut album, The Piano: A Journey from Hubris to Humility, released in 2005, juxtaposed Franz Liszt's Piano Sonata in B minor and Les jeux d'eau à la villa d'Este with works by Ravel, including Jeux d'eau and La Valse, as well as music by Johann Sebastian Bach.

His subsequent Yarlung album, Evening Conversations, presented works by Mozart, Frédéric Chopin, Robert Schumann, Sergei Rachmaninoff, Domenico Scarlatti, and contemporary composer Tan Dun. The programme included Schumann's Kinderszenen, Rachmaninoff's Op. 32 preludes, Mozart's Fantasy in C minor, and Tan Dun's Eight Memories in Watercolor.

The album received favourable reviews. James Harrington of the American Record Guide singled out Fung's phrasing and musicality, describing the recording as his "overall favorite" among those he reviewed. Gary Lemco of Audiophile Audition also noted the variety of the programme and the range of touch and articulation in Fung's playing.

In 2019, Steinway & Sons released the first volume of Fung's recordings of the complete piano sonatas of Mozart. The recording was described by AllMusic as "undeniably bold", while Boston classical radio station WCRB praised the performances for their exploration of the contrasting characters in Mozart's music.

In August 2020, Steinway & Sons released Transcendent Beethoven, featuring Beethoven's Six Bagatelles, Op. 126, and Piano Sonata No. 31 in A-flat major, Op. 110. The album was included in Apple Music's Best of Beethoven selection marking the 250th anniversary of the composer's birth.

=== Chamber music and collaborative recordings ===
Fung has recorded chamber music with violinists, cellists, and other instrumentalists. His recording Music of Lawrence Dillon, released by Naxos, features violinist Danielle Belen in works by American composer Lawrence Dillon, including Façade, the Sonata for Violin and Piano Motion, and The Voice.

In 2018, Fung recorded with violinist SoJin Kim for Genuin Classics. Their album includes Avner Dorman's Sonata No. 2 for Violin and Piano, Franz Schubert's Sonata in A major, D. 574, known as the Grand Duo, and Richard Strauss's Sonata in E-flat major, Op. 18.

Fung also performed on Through the Lens of Time, a recording featuring violinist Francisco Fullana, the City of Birmingham Symphony Orchestra, and conductor Carlos Izcaray, released by Orchid Classics. The album includes Alfred Schnittke's Suite in the Old Style.

His collaboration with cellist Elinor Frey on Dialoghi, released by Yarlung Records, brought together works by Bach, Benjamin Britten, Manuel de Falla, Witold Lutosławski, Kaija Saariaho, and other composers. The programme combines solo cello repertoire with works for cello and piano, including Steven Stucky's Dialoghi.

Fung's collaborative recordings have also included the Pentatone release Tippet Rise Opus 2017, featuring music performed at the Tippet Rise Art Center in Montana, including George Enescu's Impressions from Childhood.

=== Recent recordings and contemporary music ===
Fung is a member of Trio Garibaldi with clarinettist José Franch-Ballester and violist Marina Thibeault. Their album In Faded Sepia, released by ATMA Classique in March 2026, features premier recordings of works by Lowell Liebermann, Dorothy Chang, and Stephen Chatman, alongside arrangements of music by Duke Ellington by Yuri Kuriyama. Chang's Persistence, including the movement "Song, in Faded Sepia", provides the album's title.

Fung's work with contemporary composers has also included performances of music by Dinuk Wijeratne and Lowell Liebermann. In 2023, he and pianist Henry Kramer gave the world premiere of Liebermann's Romance, Etude, and Chorale for piano duet, Op. 134, at the Anchorage Chamber Music Festival.

In 2025, Fung performed Grażyna Bacewicz's Piano Concerto with the California Symphony under conductor Donato Cabrera. In 2026, he premiered Patrick Carrabré's Piano Concerto, A Guest on These Lands, with the Kamloops Symphony.

== Teaching and academic appointments ==
Fung joined the piano faculty of the University of British Columbia School of Music in 2021. His work at the university has included teaching piano and chamber music and curating the Steinway Spirio Piano Series at the Chan Centre for the Performing Arts in Vancouver.

In April 2024, the Manhattan School of Music announced Fung's appointment to its College piano faculty.
