= Anna Maria della Pietà =

Italian musician (c. 1696–1782)

Anna Maria
- Born: c. 1696
- Died: 10 August 1782; Venice

Anna Maria della Pietà (c. 1696 – 10 August 1782), sometimes given as just Anna Maria, was an Italian violinist, composer and teacher based in the Venetian orphanage Ospedale della Pietà.

== Biography ==
Her exact date of birth is unknown because Anna Maria was an orphan at the Ospedale della Pietà (Pietà Hospital) in Venice. The orphanage was established to raise girls who would be useful to society. Babies would be dropped off through an opening barely large enough for them called a 'Scaffetta'. In 1696 she was left at the Osepedale della Pietà and was called Anna Maria, though later known as Anna Maria dal Violin and Anna Maria della Pietà. By the time she was eight her musical prowess had brought her to the attention of the heads of the school. She was taught the violin by the school music director Antonio Vivaldi.

Anna Maria in turn taught Chiara della Pietà and Santa della Pietà. Many of the concertos written by Vivaldi were written especially for her. She remained at the orphanage her whole life. Her music brought tourists to hear her and the orchestra play. An anonymous poet wrote that when she played, "countless angels dared to hover near". In 1720, at the age of 24, she was dubbed "Maestra", and by 1737 she had attained the leadership posts of maestra di violino and maestra di coro. Anna Maria also played the cello, oboe, lute, mandolin, harpsichord, and viola d'amore. Anna Maria composed music and performed publicly for more than 60 years, dying of a fever and cough in Venice on 10 August 1782.
