= Santa della Pietà =

Italian musician

Santa (also known as Sanza or Samaritana) della Pietà (fl. ca. 1725 – ca. 1750, died after 1774) was an Italian singer, composer, and violinist. She grew up as a foundling in the Ospedale della Pietà, where she received a full musical education. She studied violin with Anna Maria della Pietà, and succeeded her as director of the school orchestra around 1740. She is known to have performed at least six of the violin concertos composed for Anna Maria della Pietà by Vivaldi.

== Life ==
A foundling admitted in infancy to the Ospedale della Pietà, della Pietà received a full grounding in music from early childhood at the coro, or music school, attached to the convent. She is known to have been a contralto soloist, violinist, and composer during the tenures of Giovanni Porta, Nicola Porpora, and Andrea Bernasconi as heads of the school. She is also known to have studied violin with Anna Maria della Pietà (also named ″Anna Maria dal violin″) and to have succeeded her as director of the school orchestra around 1740; at this time, she performed at least six of the concertos written by Antonio Vivaldi for Anna Maria. One piece by Santa, a setting of the Vespers Psalm 113 in D, survives.

Along with Agata and Michielina della Pietà, Santa della Pietà was one of three foundlings resident at the Ospedale to become a composer later in life. Nothing further is known about her.
