= Barbara Ovstedal =

British writer (1921–2012)

Barbara Ovstedal (3 October 1921 – 23 November 2012) was an author who wrote under the pseudonyms Barbara Paul and Barbara Douglas. She later changed to Rosalind Laker when Barbara Paul gained recognition.

Her many books include The Sugar Pavilion and To Dance with Kings.

== Bibliography ==
- Sovereign’s Key (1970)
- Far Seeks the Heart (1970)
- Sail a Jewelled Ship (1971)
- The Shripney Lady (1972)
- Fair Wind of Love (1974) (published under the pseudonym Barbara Douglas by Doubleday U.S.A., 1980)
- The Smuggler's Bride (1975)
- Ride the Blue Ribband (1976)
- Warwyck's Wife (1979 in the UK), also as Warwyck's Woman (1978 in the US)
- Claudine's Daughter (1979)
- Warwyck's Choice (1980 in the US), also as The Warwycks of Easthampton (1980 in the UK)
- Banners of Silk (1981)
- Gilded Splendour (1982)
- Jewelled Path (1983)
- What the Heart Keeps (1984)
- This Shining Land (1984)
- Tree of Gold (1986)
- The Silver Touch (1987)
- To Dance with Kings (1989)
- Circle of Pearls (1990)
- The Golden Tulip
- The Venetian Mask (1992)
- The Sugar Pavilion (1993)
- The Fortuny Gown (1994)
- The Fragile Hour (1996)
- New World, New Love (2003)
- To Dream of Snow
- Brilliance (2007)
- Garlands of Gold (2008)
- The House by the Fjord (2011)

== Sources ==
- Rosalind Laker bibliography
- Homepage of writer Barbara Paul on the confusion of names.
- Her obituary.
