= Pietà (Flandrin) =

Painting by Hippolyte Flandrin

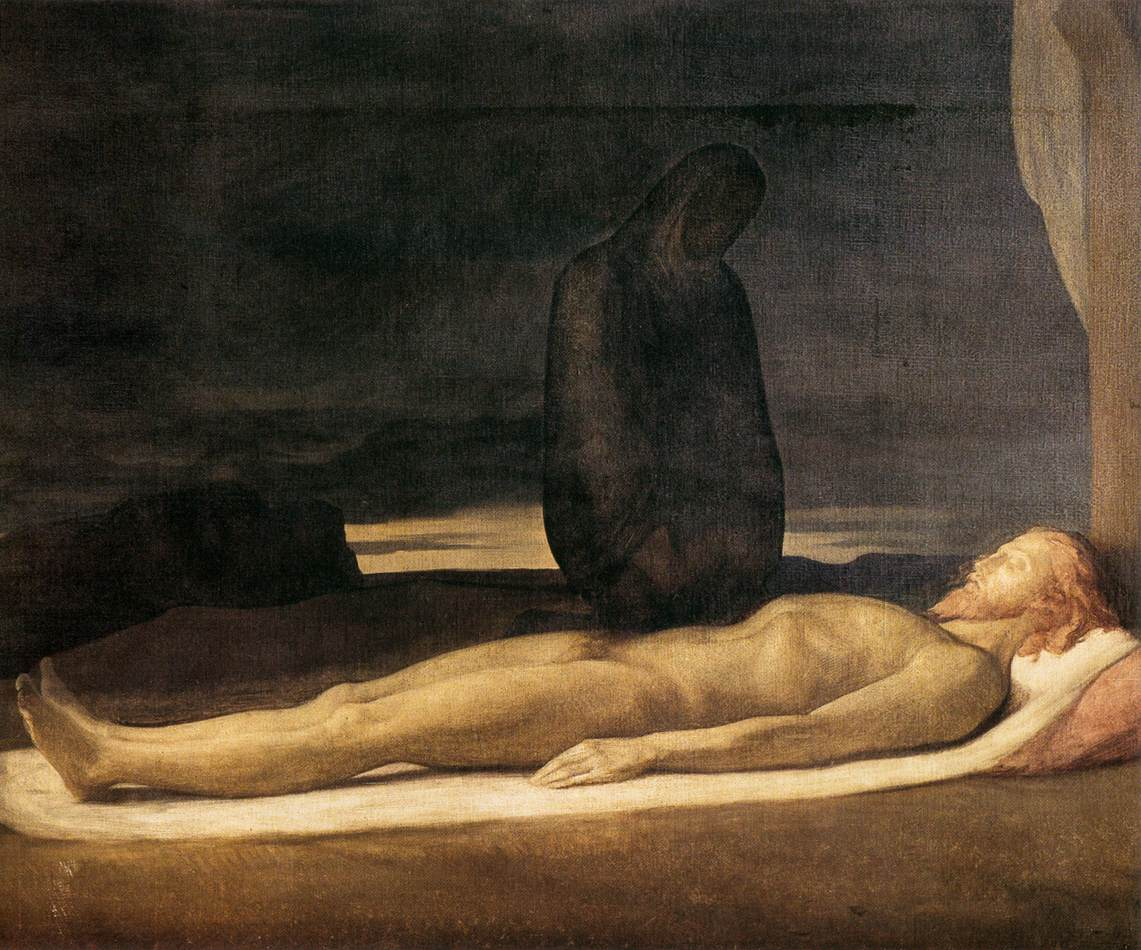
- Artist: Hippolyte Flandrin
- Year: c. 1842
- Medium: Oil on canvas
- Dimensions: 172 cm × 258 cm (68 in × 102 in)
- Location: Museum of Fine Arts of Lyon; Lyon

Pietà is an oil painting on canvas by French artist Hippolyte Flandrin, created c. 1842. It is held at the Museum of Fine Arts of Lyon.

== History and description ==
Flandrin was a devout Roman Catholic and dedicated a large part of his work to religiously inspired painting. This depiction of large dimensions of the dead Jesus in the tomb is rather unusual and original for his time. It is believed that this work was inspired by the recent death of his brother Auguste Flandrin (1804–1842), who was also a painter, and that the face of Jesus in the painting was inspired by his.

Jesus appears totally naked in the tomb, lying in a white shroud, with the background of a desertic and enigmatic landscape. Only one other figure is visible in the painting, a woman, dressed in black. The female figure is traditionally identified with the Virgin Mary, but despite her clothing matching her traditional depiction, except for the entirely black colour, in this case her facial features are not visible, which gives an even more disturbing element to the painting. The background is almost entirely dark, except for the light on the horizon. The corpse of Jesus appears illuminated from above, which makes a contrast with the figure in black that stares at Him.

It has been speculated that the woman dressed in black is a symbol of death, which would relate it to the recent death of Flandrin's older brother. It has been also claimed that the painting questions the traditional Christian belief in Jesus's resurrection, which seems unlikely because Flandrin was a devout Catholic.
