= Santa Maria della Visitazione al Ponte delle Lame =

Church building in Bologna, Italy

Church of Santa Maria della Visitazione al Ponte delle Lame
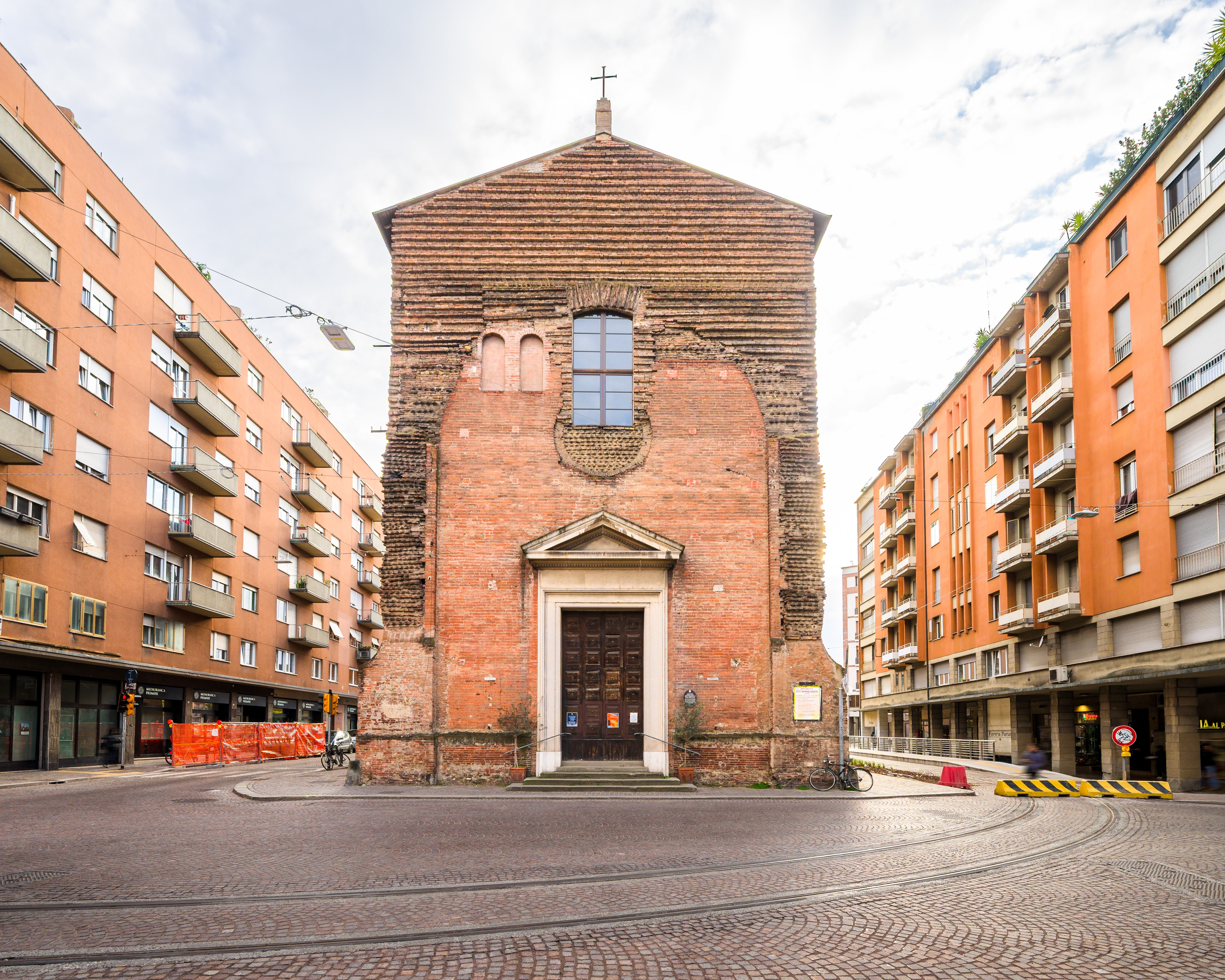

Religion
- Affiliation: Roman Catholic
- Province: Bologna

Location
- Location: Bologna, Italy
- Interactive map of Church of Santa Maria della Visitazione al Ponte delle Lame

Architecture
- Type: Church
- Style: Renaissance
- Groundbreaking: 16th century

Santa Maria della Visitazione al Ponte delle Lame, is a church or sanctuary in central Bologna, Italy.

At one time, the church was built around an oratory in the middle of a bridge, and surrounded by the Reno Canal. It was founded in 1527, when an icon in a tabernacle on the bridge became the site for prayers during an epidemic of the plague. After the epidemic ebbed, an oratory was built at the site of the tabernacle. The interior was reconstructed in 1764 in a late Baroque style, and linked to Confraternity of the Poor of Saint Roch. On July 16, 1942, it was declared a Marian Sanctuary. The structure is now deconsecrated.

== Sources ==
- Beni Culturali Emilia Romagna
