= Anna Bon =

Italian composer and singer (1738 – after 1769)

- Born: c. 11 August 1738; Bologna
- Died: after 1769
- Occupations: Composer; singer

Anna Bon (11 August 1738 – after 1769) was an Italian composer and singer of the late Baroque and early Classical periods.

== Life ==
Anna was baptized on August 11, 1738 in Bologna as "Anna Ioanna Lucia, filia Hieronymus Boni et Rosa Ruinetti"[sic], some time after her parents had come back from a tour that included performances at Anna of Russia's court in Saint Petersburg. Her parents were both involved in music and traveled internationally; her father was Girolamo Bon, a Bolognese librettist and scenographer, and her mother was the singer Rosa Ruvinetti Bon. On March 8, 1743, at the age of four, she was admitted to the Ospedale della Pietà in Venice as a student; that she had a surname indicates that she was not a foundling as were most of the Pietà wards, but a tuition-paying pupil (figlia de spesi). She studied with the maestra di viola, Candida della Pietà (who herself had been admitted into the coro in 1707).

By 1756, Anna had rejoined her parents in Bayreuth where they were in the service of Margrave Friedrich of Brandenburg Kulmbach; she held the new post of 'chamber music virtuosa' at the court, and dedicated her six op. 1 flute sonatas, published in Nürnberg in 1756, to Friedrich. From the frontispiece we learn that she composed them at the age of sixteen.

In 1762, the family moved to the Esterházy court at Eisenstadt, where Anna remained until at least 1765. She dedicated the published set of six harpsichord sonatas, op. 2 (1757), to Ernestina Augusta Sophia, Princess of Saxe-Weimar, and the set of six divertimenti (trio sonatas), op. 3 (1759), to Charles Theodore, Elector of Bavaria.

By 1767, Anna was living in Hildburghausen, Thuringia, with her husband, a singer named Mongeri.

== Works list ==
- Six Chamber Sonatas, for transverse flute with violoncello or harpsichord, op. 1 (VI sonate da camera: per il flauto traversiere, violoncello o cembalo: opera prima), in C, F, B, D, G Mi, G Ma (Nürnberg: Balthasar Schmidts Witwe, 1756). Facsimile reprints: (1) Firenze: Studio per Edizioni Scelte, 1988; (2) New York: Performers' Facsimiles, 1998. New editions: (1) Fayetteville AR: ClarNan Editions, 1989; (2) Kassel: Furore, 2007; (3) Sonata op. 1 no. 6, edited by Elisabeth Weinzierl, in Flute Music by Female Composers (Mainz, New York: Schott, 2008).
- Six Sonatas for Harpsichord, op. 2 (Sei sonate per il cembalo, opera seconda), in G Mi, B-flat, F, C, B Mi, C (Nürnberg: Balthasar Schmidts Witwe, 1757). Facsimile edition, New York: Performers‘ Facsimiles, 1998. New editions (1) edited with introduction by Barbara Garvey Jackson, Fayetteville, AR: ClarNan Editions, 1989; (2) edited by Barbara Harbach, Pullman WA: Vivace Press, 1995; (3) edited by Jane Schatkin Hettrick, Bryn Mawr: Hildegard Publishing, 1997.
- Six Divertimenti, for two flutes and basso continuo, op. 3, in G, D, D Mi, G, C, A (Nürnberg: Balthasar Schmidts Witwe, 1759). New edition, edited by Sally Fortino, Bryn Mawr PA: Hildegard Publishing, 1993.
- Aria, "Astra coeli," for soprano, 2 violins, viola, and basso continuo. New edition, edited by Elke Martha Umbach and Robert Schenke, Kassel: Furore, 2006.
- Offertory, "Ardete amore," for soprano, 2 altos, bass, 2 oboes, 2 horns, 2 violins, viola, and basso continuo.
- Motet, "Eia in preces et veloces," for alto, 2 violins, viola, and basso continuo.
- Opera, now lost, composed during her stay at the court of Prince Esterhazy in Eisenstadt.

== Discography (Partial) ==
- Chamber Sonatas op. 1. (1) Sabine Dreier, flute; Irene Hegen, square piano. Recorded in September 1992 at St John Church, Bayreuth. Georgsmarienhütte: Classic Produktion Osnabrück, 1992. CPO 999 181-2. (2) Christiane Meininger, flute; Traud Kloft, harpsichord. Bayer, 1994. (3) Claudio Ferrarini, flute; Andrea Corsi, bassoon; Francesco Tasini, harpsichord. Munich: Mondo Musica, 1996. Notes include a portrait of the composer, artist's name not given.

(4) Sonata d Op.1/2 Stefano Bet, traverso; Edward Smith, clavicembalo. Recorded in June 1996 at Venezia, Chiesa dell'Ospedaletto. Skira SK00272, 1996. (5) Christiane Meininger, flute; Fine Zimmermann, harpsichord. “Hofkomponistinnen in Europa. Vol. 3.” Cybele, 1999. (6) Sonata D Op.1/4 Stefano Bet, traverso; Francesco Cera, clavicembalo. Recorded in February 1998 at Lugano Teatro RTSI. Tactus 700002, 1998.

- Chamber Sonatas op. 1 nos. 4 & 5; Sonatas for Harpsichord op. 2 nos. 1 & 5; Divertimenti op. 3 nos. 1-3. Elke Martha Umbach, Susanne Wendler, flute; Johannez Platz, violin; Heike Johanna Lindner, violoncello; Jan Grüter, theorbo; Ilka Wagner, bassoon; Anke Dennert, harpsichord. “Sonatas from the Court at Bayreuth.” Korschenbroich, Germany: Aeolus, 2003.
- Sonatas for Harpsichord op. 2. Barbara Harbach, harpsichord. Newton CT: MSR Classics, 2008.
- Sonata for Harpsichord op. 2, no. 6: Allegro. Fine Zimmermann, harpsichord. “Hofkomponistinnen in Europe, Vol. 2.” Internationale Komponistinnen-Bibliothek Unna, 1998.
- Six Divertimenti op. 3. Performed on period instruments. Sabine Dreier and Peter Spohr, transverse flutes; Rhoda Patrick, bassoon; Tatjana Geiger, harpsichord; Thorsten Bleich, archlute. EMEC E-023, 1997.
- Divertimento op. 3, no. 3, arr. for flute, violin, cello, harpsichord. "Hofkomponistinnen in Europe, Vol. 1.” Internationale Komponistinnen-Bibliothek Unna, 1988.
- Divertimento op. 3 no. 6. "Wilhelmine von Bayreuth." Elisabeth Weinzierl and Edmund Wächter, transverse flutes; Eva Schieferstein, harpsichord; Philipp von Morgen, cello. Thorofon 2565, 2010.
- Chamber Sonatas op. 1 nos. 4, 5 & 6; Sonata for Harpsichord op. 2 no. 6; Divertimento op. 3 no. 4; Aria "Astra coeli"; Offertory "Ardete amore"; Motet "Eia preces et veloces." Julianne Baird, soprano; Ensemble "La Donna Musicale." "Anna Bon: La virtuoza di Venezia" 10104, 2010.
- Anna Bon Sei Sonate da Camera per il Flauto Traversiere. Silvia Moroni flauto traversiere, Ensemble Oberon. Tactus TC745201 2009
