= Chiara della Pietà =

Italian musician (1718–1791)

Chiara
- Born: 1718
- Died: 1791 (aged 72–73); Venice
- Education: Ospedale della Pietà

Chiara della Pietà (1718–1791), was an Italian violinist, soloist and teacher based in the Venetian orphanage Ospedale della Pietà.

== Biography ==
Chiara was deposited as a 2 month old to the Ospedale della Pietà in Venice in 1718. She was called Chiara and Chiaretta, though like her teacher Anna Maria della Pietà she was later known as Chiara dal Violin or Chiara della Pietà. Though she was not as talented as her teacher, she was considered a violin virtuoso.

She documented the various compositions which were written for her, some of which were written by Antonio Vivaldi, in a book known as her diary. Other compositions were by Antonio Martinelli. Chiara sang, played the organ and the viola d’amore. She remained at the orphanage her whole life, playing and teaching there.
