= Agata della Pietà =

Italian composer (1712–1769)

Agata della Pietà (24 March 1712 – 17 October 1769) was an Italian composer, singer, and teacher of music at the Venetian charitable institution Ospedale della Pietà.

A foundling admitted in infancy to the Ospedale della Pietà in Venice, she received thorough musical training starting in her childhood through the instruction of an older woman named Apollonia, who was also top soprano vocalist for the Ospedale. After years of training, Agata became a performing member in the institution's musical ensembles, called the coro; she later became a soprano soloist, singing teacher, and administrator. She is known to have been the soloist in motets commissioned from Giovanni Porta, Nicola Porpora and Andrea Bernasconi, in whose manuscripts she is mentioned by name; she is also mentioned in an anonymous verse tribute to musicians of the Pietà cori which dates to around 1740.

Agata della Pietà is known to have written several musical compositions, including a setting of Psalm 134 Ecce nunc for compline (night prayers). The harpsichordist Elizabeth Anderson completed a reconstruction of this work in 2022 and it was first performed by the Australian Chamber Choir in Melbourne in May 2022. The Australian Chamber Choir conducted by Douglas Lawrence recorded Ecce nunc, the work's first, in 2024. Other known compositions are two Marian antiphons Regina Caeli and Salve Regina in the style of solo motets, as well as a solo motet titled Novo aprili in F (inscribed to one "Louisa"); only parts of these compositions survive today, although they demonstrate that Agata knew standard levels of composition in her time, including advanced techniques and professional levels of musicianship that equalled her contemporaries.

Along with Michielina and Santa della Pietà, Agata della Pietà was one of at least three foundlings of the Ospedale known to have become a composer. Agata was held at high esteem within the Ospedale della Pietà until the end of her life. She helped maintain the institution's musical collections, she taught several younger women to high levels of music, and she was eventually raised to the position of prioress (Priora), or head of the women's section of the institution, in her fifties. She died at the age of 56, on 7 October 1769.

== Film ==
- "Agatha's Story, trailer and background" (2026) Australian Chamber Choir; "Agatha's Story (54 minutes)", SBS On Demand
