= Santa Maria della Pietà, Venice =

Church in Venice, Italy

Santa Maria della Pietà
- Santa Maria della Visitazione
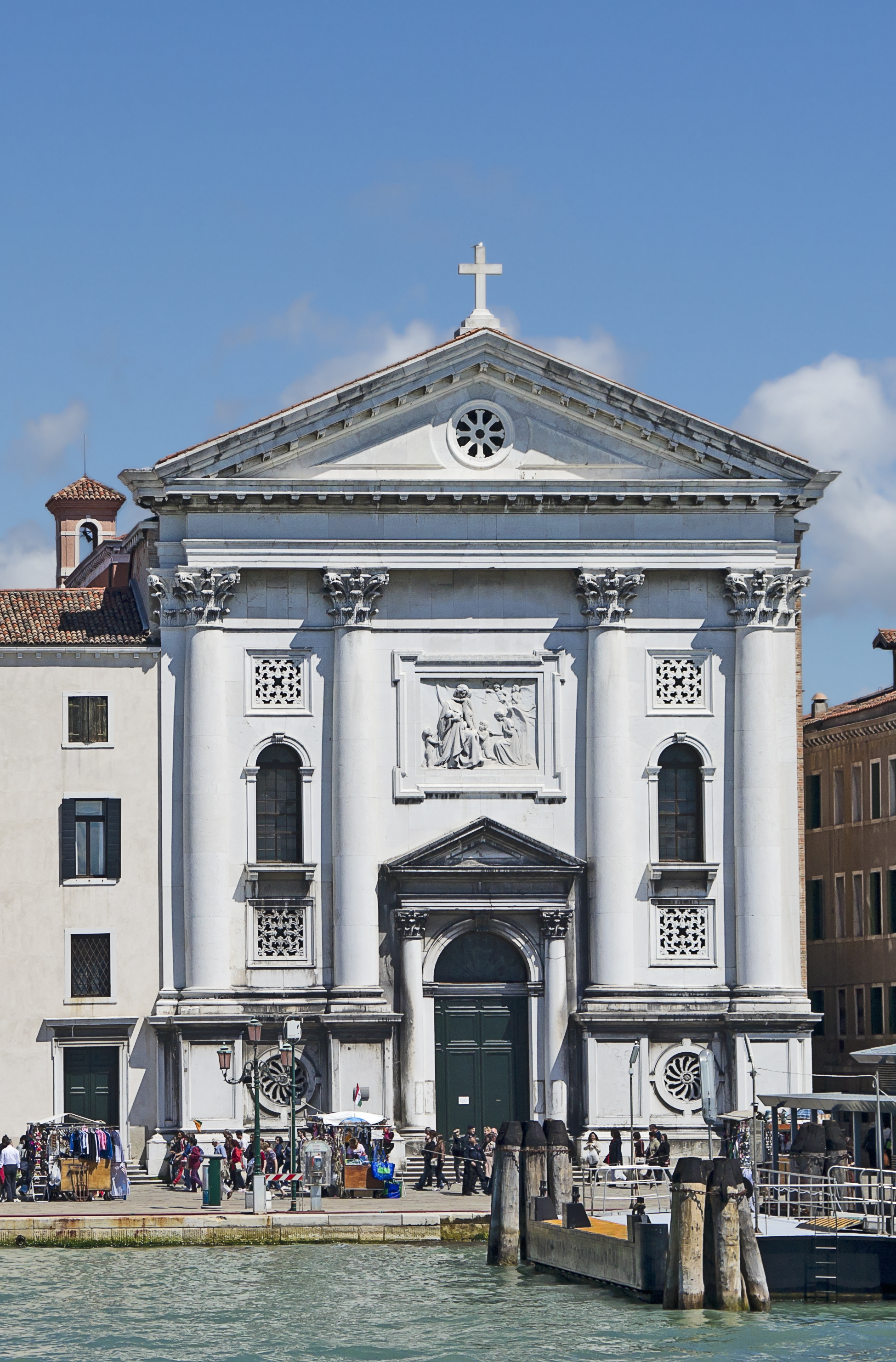
- Facade (1906) 45°26′03″N 12°20′42″E

- Location within Venice Location within Italy

Religion
- Affiliation: Catholic Church
- Sect: Roman Rite
- Province: Venice
- Region: Veneto

Location
- State: Italy
- Interactive map of Santa Maria della Pietà

Architecture
- Architect: Giorgio Massari
- Style: Baroque architecture
- Established: 1745
- Completed: 1760

Website
- www.pietavenezia.org/it/

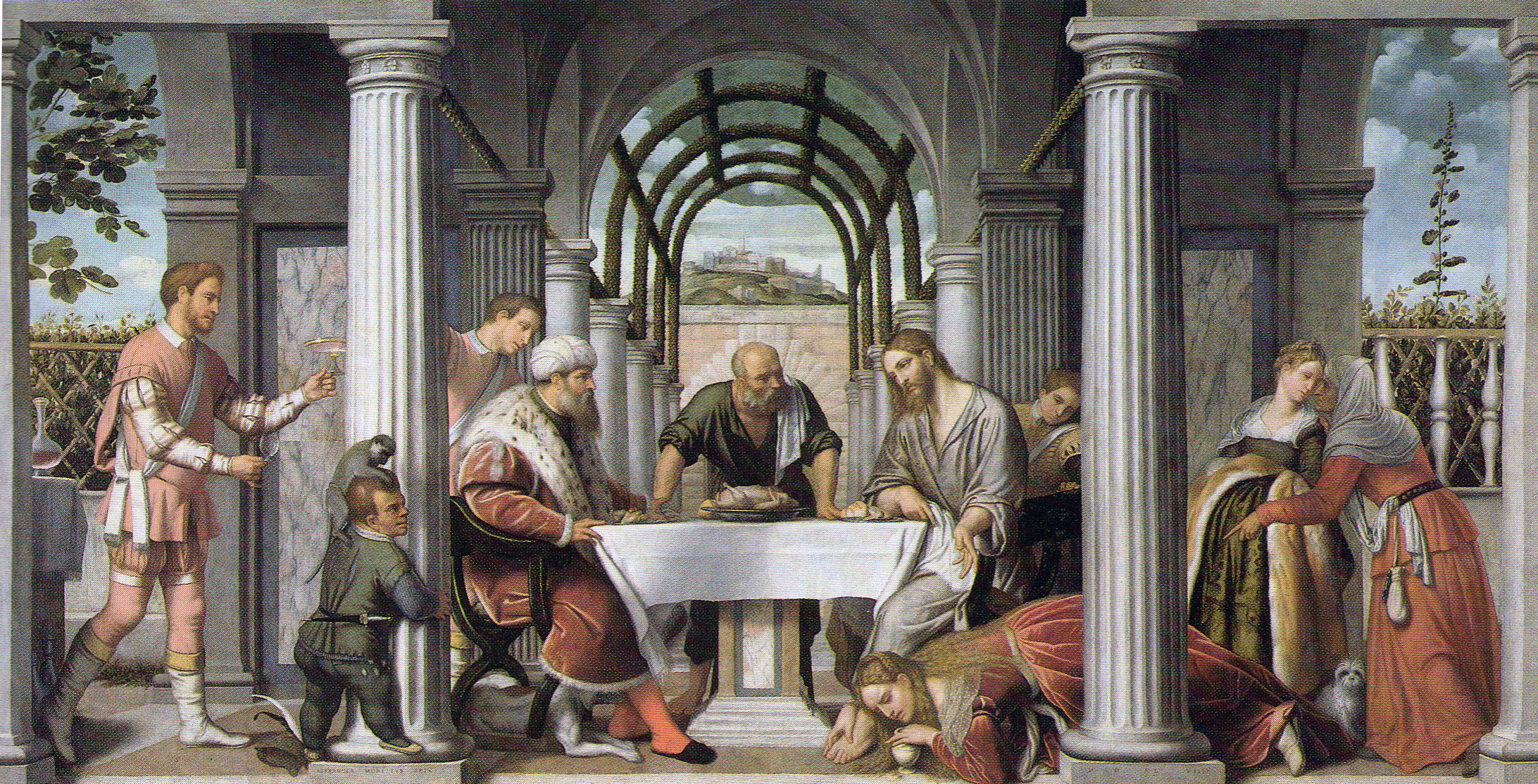
Supper in the House of Simon the Pharisee (Moretto)

The church of Santa Maria della Pietà or della Visitazione is a prominent church in the sestiere of Castello in Venice, Italy. It is sited on the Riva degli Schiavoni, a short walk from the Doge's Palace.

== History ==
The present church was built from 1745-1760 adjacent to the site of an earlier church, which served as the chapel of a girls orphanage and hospital, the Ospedale della Pietà which was run by the State of Venice. Vivaldi served here as the Concert Master from 1703 to 1740.

The design of the church was by Giorgio Massari, but its façade remained incomplete, with marble facing rising only a third of the way up the columns. In 1906, it was completed but without the originally projected three statues on the roof. Only a single simple cross ornaments the centre. Above the entrance is a large bas-relief representing Charity (1800) by Marsili.

The interior is oval. The ceilings were frescoed by Tiepolo depicting Strength and Peace and Triumph of Faith, flanked by angelic musicians, while the presbytery was painted by the same artist with the theological Virtues, (1745-1755). Tiepolo was aided by Jacopo Guarana, the pupil of Sebastiano Ricci who had originally made designs for the frescoes.

A chapel by Giovanni Maria Morlaiter with a precious tabernacle decorated with gilded bronze figures and, at the sides, the Archangels Gabriel and Michael. The altar-piece, representing the Visitation, was begun by Giambattista Piazzetta and, on his death, finished by his disciple, Giuseppe Angeli. In the choir above the main entrance door there is a painting depicting Jesus in Simon’s house (1544) by Alessandro Bonvicino, called the Moretto da Brescia. In the side altars there are paintings by Maggiotto, Giuseppe Angeli, and Angelo Marinetti.

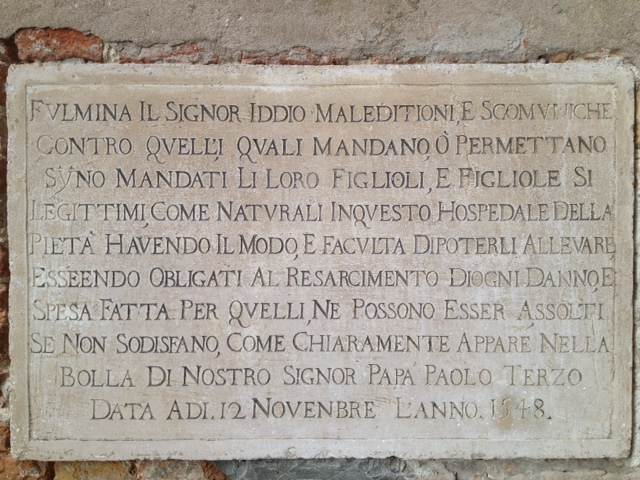
Plaque on the exterior of the church threatening excommunication to all who abandon children for whom they can provide.
