= Gennaro D'Alessandro =

Italian composer and harpsichordist

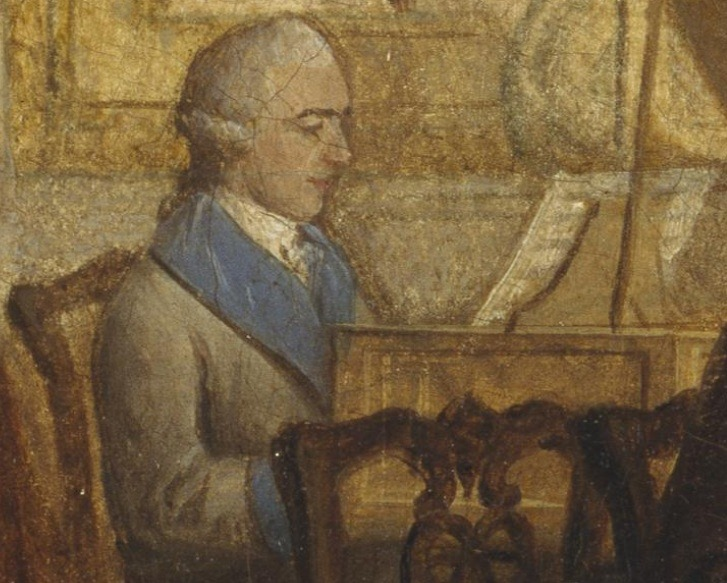
- Pietro Fabris, Kenneth Mackenzie, 1st Earl of Seaforth, 1744–1781, at home in Naples: concert party, portrait of Gennaro D'Alessandro playing the harpsichord (identification proposed by Giovanni Tribuzio in 2016) oil on canvas, 1770–1771, Edinburgh, Scottish National Portrait Gallery
- Born: 1717? Naples
- Died: after 1778; Naples

Gennaro (Janvier) D'Alessandro or D'Alessandri, Alexandre, Allexandro, D'Allessandria (1717? – after 28 July 1778) was an Italian Baroque composer and harpsichordist.

== Biography ==
He was a pupil in Naples of Leonardo Leo. Later, he became maestro di coro at the Pio Ospedale della Pietà in Venice from 21 August 1739 to 13 May 1740, then harpsichord master of Madame de Martenet and Germain-Anne Loppin de Montmort in Dijon (from 1 October 1740 to 1749), Charles-Catherine Loppin de Gemeaux, Madame de Noinvilles and Madame de La Pouplinière in Paris (1743).

Back in Naples, he was also singing master of Madeleine-Zoé-Anne-Marguerite Seimandy (1778) and participated in some accademie di musica at the Villa Angelica of William Hamilton together with Emanuele Barbella (1768). He met prominent figures such as Frederick Christian, Elector of Saxony, Willem Carel Dierkens, Anton Raaff, Antonio Vivaldi, Carlo Goldoni, Alexandre Le Riche de La Poupelinière, Jean-Joseph de Mondonville, Charles de Brosses and Giacomo Francesco Milano Franco d'Aragona.

== Works ==
=== Sacred music ===
- 1 Missa brevis
- 1 Miserere

=== Instrumental music ===
- 2 sinfonias/overtures (1739-1742 c.)
- Pièces de clavessin [...] toutes difficilles for Germain-Anne Loppin de Montmort (1744; lost).

=== Operas ===
- Ottone on libretto by Antonio Salvi accommodated by Carlo Goldoni (Venice, Teatro di S. Giovanni Grisostomo, 1739-1740); partly adapted by Paolo Scalabrini as Adelaide by Pietro Mingotti's company (Prague, Leipzig and Hamburg, 1744)

=== Arias ===
- Doux zéphir qui caresse (Dijon or Paris, 1740-1749 c.)
- Non sperar tiranno (Dijon or Paris, 1741 c.; doubtful)

=== Serenatas ===
- Il coro delle muse on lyrics by Carlo Goldoni with a sinfonia and three concertos con molti istromenti by Antonio Vivaldi (Venice, Pio Ospedale della Pietà, 1740)

=== Cantatas ===
- La ninfa saggia on lyrics by Carlo Goldoni (Venice, Pio Ospedale della Pietà, 1739)
- Gli amanti felici on lyrics by Carlo Goldoni (Venice, Pio Ospedale della Pietà, 1739)
- Le quattro stagioni on lyrics by Carlo Goldoni (Venice, Pio Ospedale della Pietà, 1739)

== Discography ==
- Gennaro D'Alessandro, Arie dall'opera Adelaide. Hamburg 1744, Francesco Divito (male soprano), «Benedetto Marcello» Baroque Ensemble, Ettore Maria Del Romano (conductor), Tactus, TC 710401, 2024.
