= Andrea Bernasconi =

18th-century Italian composer

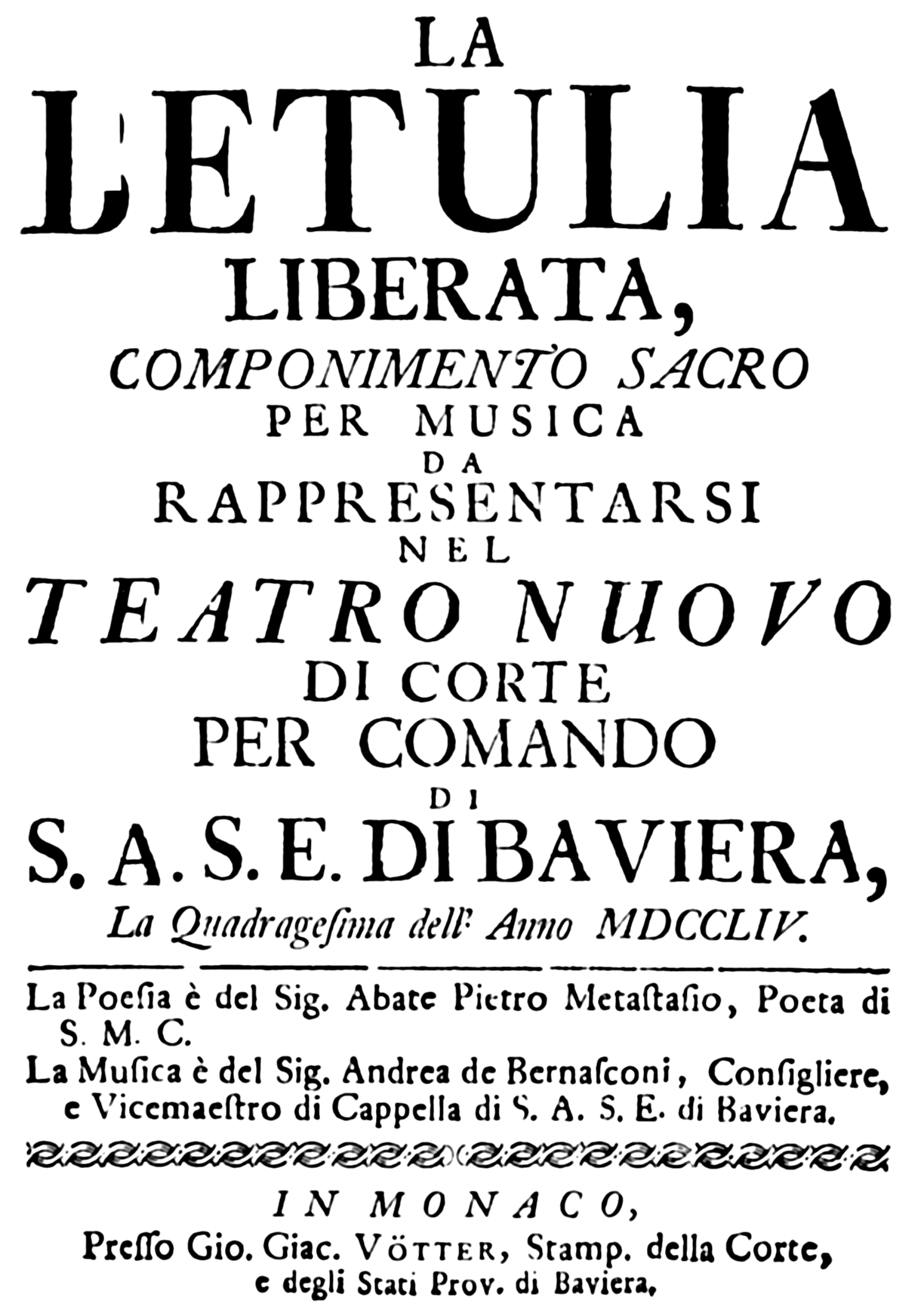
Andrea Bernasconi - La Betulia liberata - titlepage of the libretto - Munich 1754

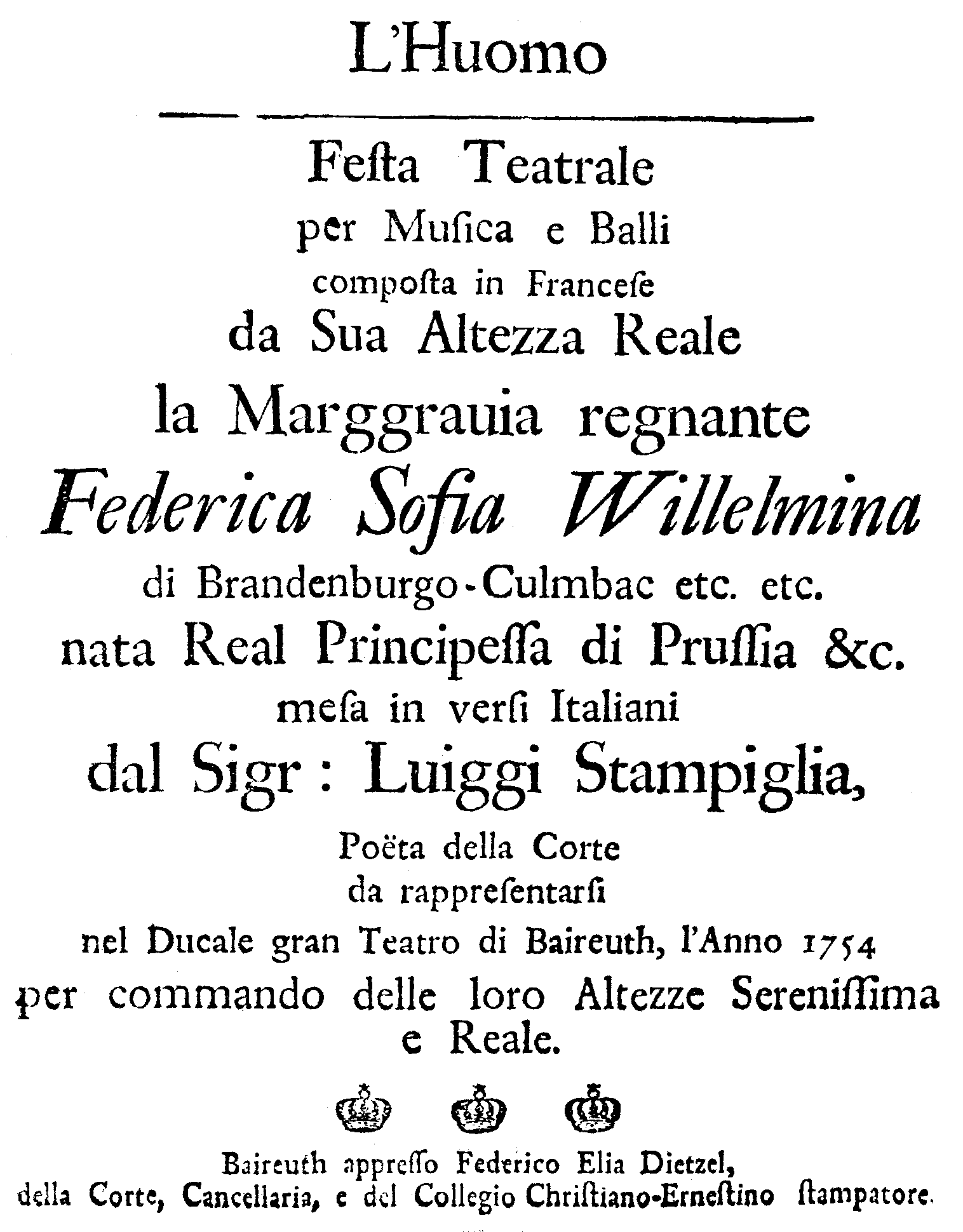
Andrea Bernasconi - L'Huomo - titlepage of the libretto - Munich 1754

Andrea Bernasconi (c. 1706 – 24 January 1784) was an Italian composer.

He began his career in his native country as a composer of operas. In 1755, he was appointed to the post of Kapellmeister at the Bavarian court in Munich where he produced several more operas successfully and a few symphonies. After 1772, his compositional output consisted entirely of sacred music. He was the stepfather of soprano Antonia Bernasconi.

His festa teatrale L'Huomo was performed on 14 June 1754, at the ducal opera house in Bayreuth. This one-act tragicomedy was commissioned by Princess Wilhelmine of Bayreuth based on her poem L'Homme, translated by Luigi Stampiglia.

== Recordings ==
L'Huomo Philipp Mathmann Maria Ladurner Francesca Benitez Anna Herbst, Johanna Rosa Falkinger, Alice Lackner, Simon Bode. Florian Götz. Ensemble 1700 conducted Dorothee Oberlinger 3CD Sony 2024, performed at 46th Tage Alter Musik in Herne 2022, and May 2023.
