= Lillie Berg =

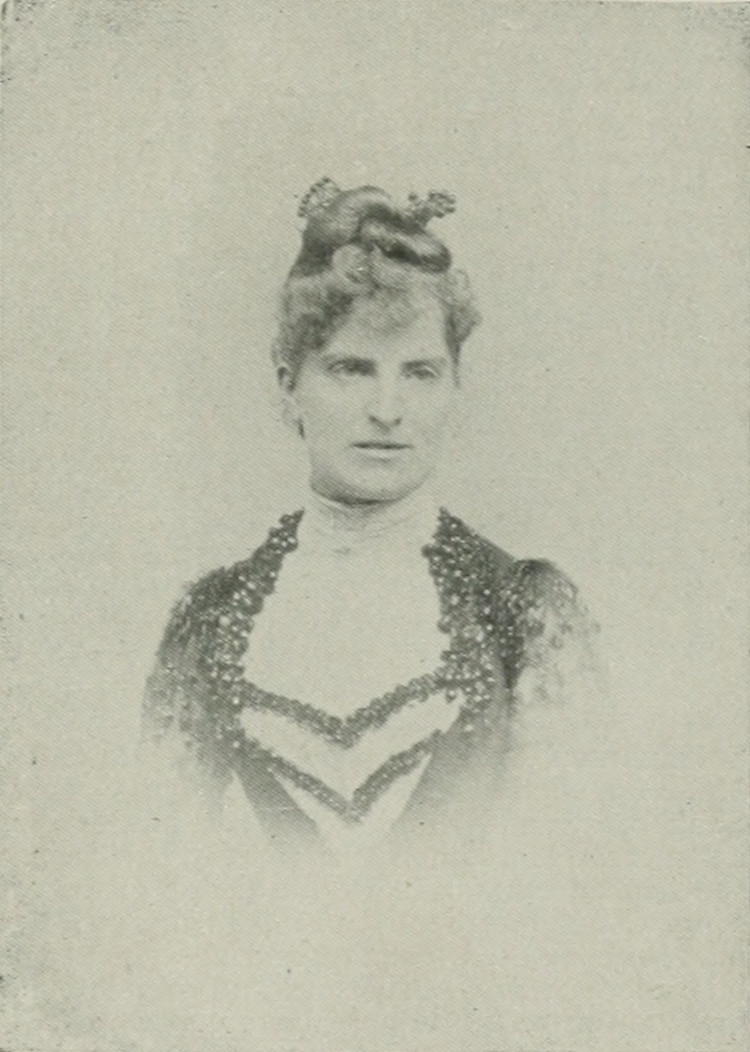
Lillie Berg, "A woman of the century"

Lillie Berg (c. 1845 – died after 1896) was an American musician and musical educator.

Berg studied under Sigmund Lebert, Immanuel Faisst, and Ludwig Stark, and graduating from the Royal School of Music in Stuttgart, she became a teacher of piano and composition. Later, she studied voice culture under Francesco Lamperti, of Milan. Berg's school of music, following the "Lamberti method", was located at 337 West 59th Street, New York City. Her pupils were trained in operatic and concert singing in multiple languages, as well as in ballad, oratorio, and church singing.

The amount of artistic work which she accomplished was notable, as she personally instructed a large number of private pupils, professionals and distinguished amateurs, conducted and lead classes and choruses in her private music school, and was in constant demand at social gatherings. Berg was well versed in philosophy, art, history, poetry, political science and social culture, traveled extensively, and could speak five languages with fluency. She was described as "a striking blonde, with a soprano voice".

== Early years and education ==
Lillie P. Berg was born in New York City, 1845. (Note: According to Grove Music, Berg was born "circa 1845".)

Her father was a German of noble birth, and her mother was a New England woman of English ancestry. Berg passed her childhood in Stuttgart, Germany, where she was trained in piano, organ and harmony by professors Lebert, Faisst, and Stark. She was graduated from the Royal School of Music in Stuttgart (now known as State University of Music and Performing Arts Stuttgart), attending at the same time the Conservatory of Music. Professors Lebert and Stark complimented her by sending to her pupils to prepare in piano and harmony for their classes. While under the direction of Prof. Faisst, the organ teacher, she was organist and choir director of one of the most prominent churches in that city. Her precociousness caused such musical authorities as Julius Benedict and Emma Albani to advise her to devote her attention to her voice, predicting for her a brilliant future. Albani directed her to her own master, Lamperti. Lamperti, soon perceiving the ability of his new pupil, gave her the position of accompanist, which she held for three years, enabling her to note the artistic and vocal training of many of the most famous artists on the operatic and concert stages.

== Career ==
In the United States, she held the position of the foremost exponent of the Lamperti school and she studied every season with the famous artists and great teachers of Europe. Among these were Teresa Brambilla, Pauline Vaneri Filippi, Julius Stockhausen, Hermine Küchenmeister-Rudersdorf, Mathilde Marchesi, and Enrico Delle Sedie, of Paris, William Shakespeare and Alberto Randegger. She developed a "method" that was distinctively her own, and she had an extraordinary knowledge of the art of song. She had the friendship of the majority of modern composers of her time, and she aimed to combine modern progressiveness and dramatic interpretation with strict adherence to purity and beauty of tone production. She passed the spring season of each year in London, England.

Berg possessed a soprano voice. She was constantly engaged in arranging concerts and classical recitals in and out of New York. She also organized quartets and choruses. In 1880, she was in charge of the Vocal Department, Rye Seminary, particularly voice building after the Italian method. In 1888, returning again from Europe, Berg resumed her lessons in Voice Building and in the Art of Singing, at her residence, 17 East 31st Street, New York City.

To Berg belongs, it was believed, the honor of being the first woman musician in the U.S. to conduct with a baton at a public performance. In April 1891, she conducted Smart's cantata, "King Rent's Daughter," before an audience which crowded the new Carnegie Hall, New York. Having been sick for a year, a testimonial benefit concert was held for Berg on February 8, 1893, at the Madison Square Theatre. The concert was the idea of Mrs. Edward Lauterbach and Albert Morris Bagby; seven hundred people were in attendance. In the following month, it was reported that Berg had been dangerously ill, but hoped she would soon be able to resume work, and open a summer school in July. The Musical Courier of October 1895 reported that Berg had just returned from a four months' tour in Norway, Sweden, Russia, Germany and Austria. In 1896, Berg was conducting a summer school for professional singers at Round Lake, New Jersey.

Berg died in 1896. (Note: According to Grove Music, Berg died "after 1896".)
