= Two Concert Études (Liszt) =

Piano compositions by Franz Liszt

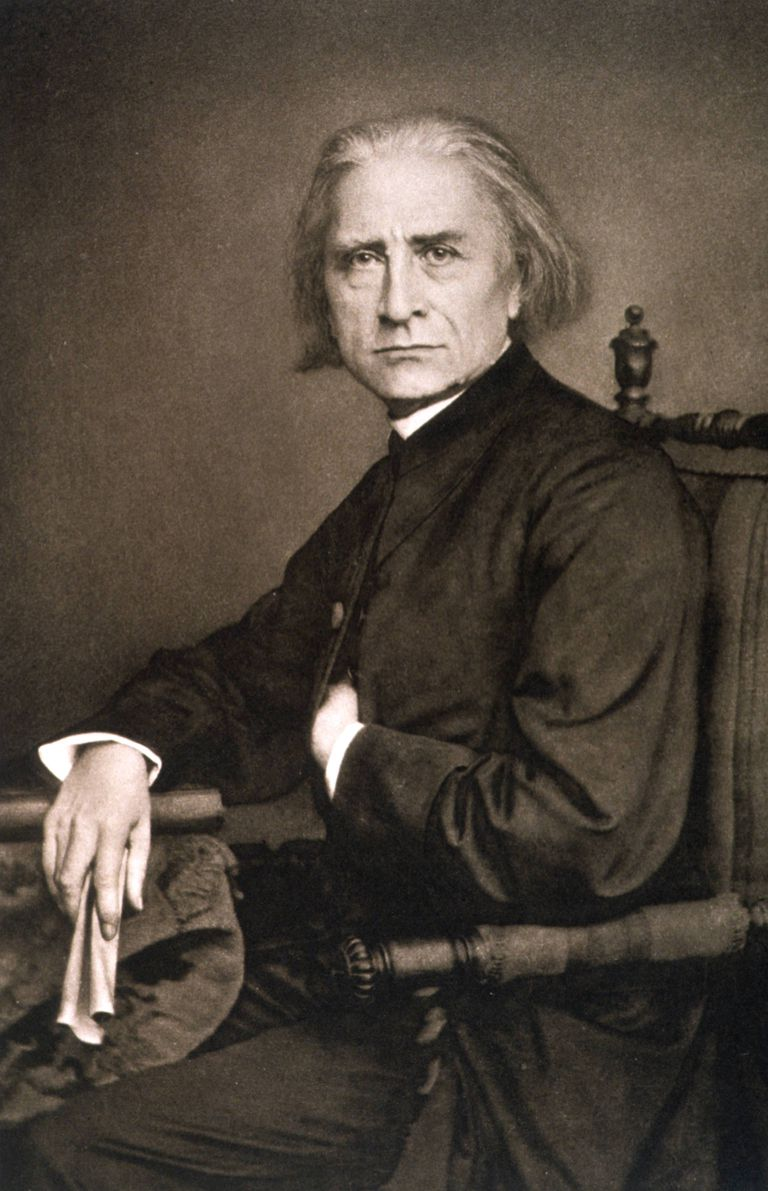
Franz Liszt, photo (mirror-imaged) by Franz Hanfstaengl, June 1870

Two Concert Études (Zwei Konzertetüden), S.145, is a set of two piano works composed in Rome around 1862/63 by Franz Liszt and dedicated to Dionys Pruckner, but intended for Sigmund Lebert and Ludwig Stark’s Klavierschule. (Note: Lebert's notoriety is mainly due to his piano method Grosse theoretisch-praktische Klavierschule, which he published in collaboration with Ludwig Stark in 1858. It was translated into several languages and widely distributed in Europe and America in its fourth edition in 1870. Lebert and Stark method is typical of the piano technique inherited from the eighteenth century harpsichord, based on "independence" and "articulation" of the fingers that move like little hammers ("raise your fingers") and that totally excludes the weight of the arm and forearm. "The hand shown in chap. 19 of Klavierschule, should remain slightly bent towards the thumb so that each finger rises and falls on the keyboard at the same height. This is the ultimate conception of piano technique based solely on the action of fingers." The Lebert and Stark method went on to enjoy, despite criticism in the nineteenth and twentieth centuries, against such an approach by supporters of the revival of piano technique in the physiological sense, a great success for more than a century.) It consists of two parts: "Waldesrauschen" (Forest Murmurs) and "Gnomenreigen" (Dance of the Gnomes).

== Details ==
"Waldesrauschen", in D♭ major, is the first of the two pieces in this set. It is known for its beauty and imitation of wind in the forest.

"Gnomenreigen" is in F♯ minor. It is known for its technical difficulty in its fast and soft passages, where the pianist imitates the sound of gnomes. It first has a theme in F♯ minor consisting of grace notes followed by eights. Then it goes to a fast, playful theme in A major. It repeats themes, and also has a theme with repeating bass notes, such as the fifty-four consecutive low Ds. Finally, the A major theme is repeated for a climactic part of the étude, this time in F♯ major.
