= Julie Rivé-King =

American pianist and composer

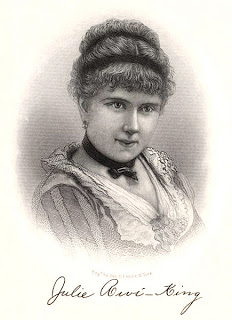
Julie Rive-King (1854-1937)

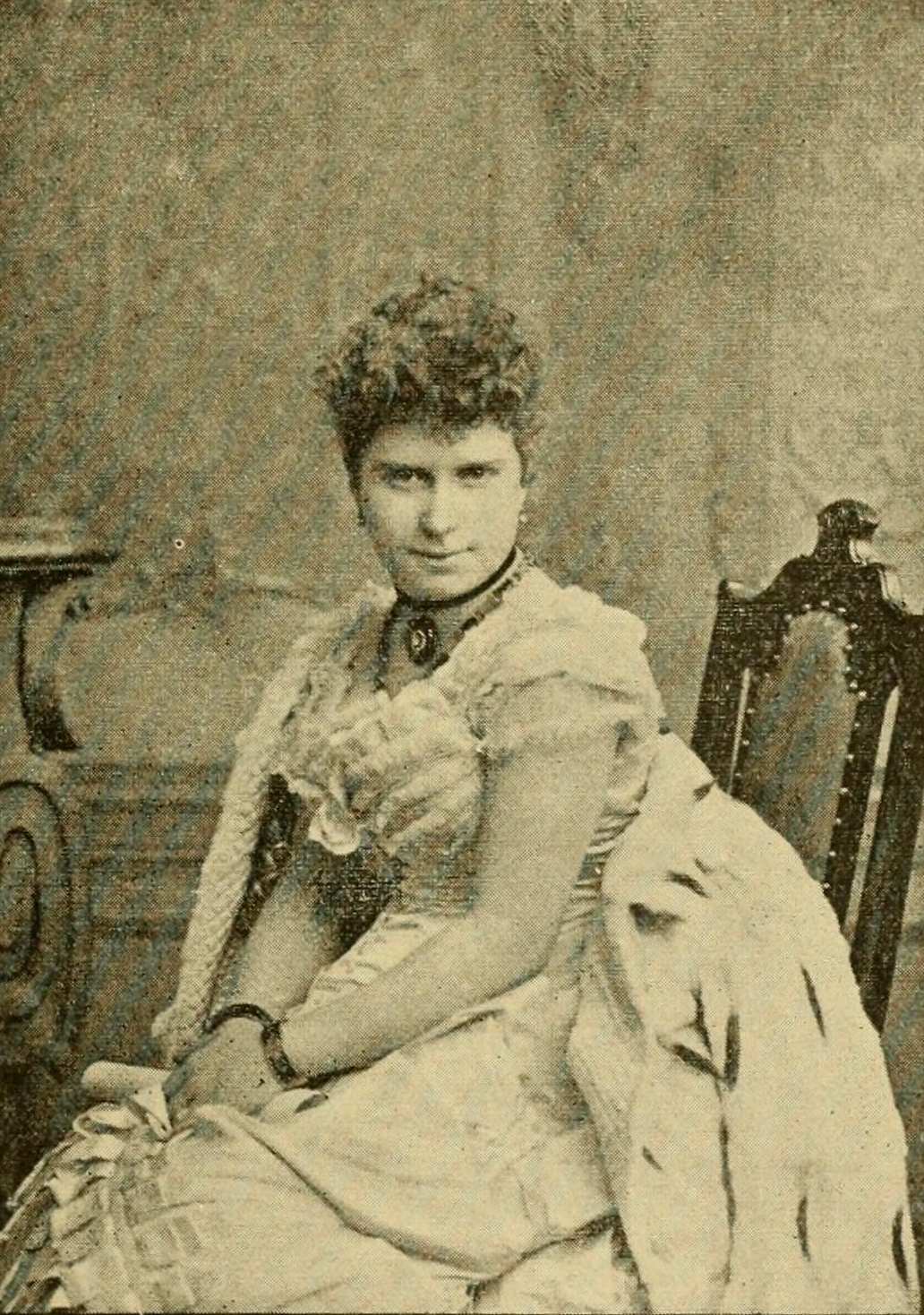
Julia Rivé-King, from an 1889 publication.

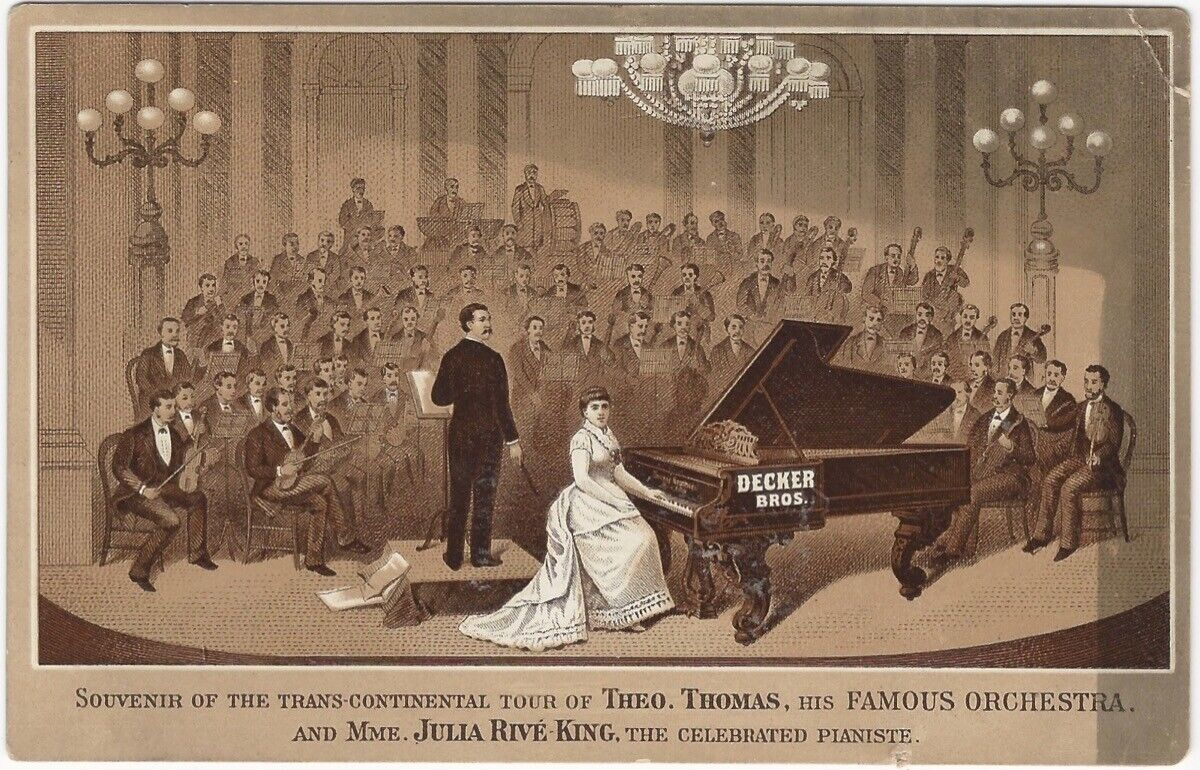
Souvenir of the Trans-Continental Tour of Theo. Thomas, his famous orchestra, and Mme. Julia Rivé King

Julie Rivé-King (October 30, 1854 – July 28, 1937) was an American pianist and composer.

== Biography ==
Julie Rivé-King was born on October 30, 1854, in Cincinnati, Ohio, of parents Caroline Staub Rivé and Léon Rivé. Her mother was a singer, teacher and composer who studied with Manuel Garcia in France, and her father was an artist and teacher. After a cholera epidemic that took three of their children in New Orleans, the couple moved to Baton Rouge, Louisville and then to Cincinnati where they found teaching positions and where Julie was born.

Jullie took music lessons from her mother and appeared in recitals at age eight. She studied at the Cincinnati Conservatory with Henry Andrès and in 1870 in New York with Sebastian Bach Mills, William Mason, Francis Korbay and Dionys Pruckner. She also studied in Europe with Franz Liszt and Carl Reinecke and made her debut in Leipzig in 1873. She began a concert tour of Europe, but returned to the US when her father was killed in a railroad accident.

She made a debut in Cincinnati in 1874, officially debuted the next year with the New York Philharmonic and then toured the Eastern and Midwestern US. In 1876 she married Frank H. King, her manager, and began a career as a composer and teacher, though still working as a concert pianist. To enhance her reputation, King persuaded her to publish his own works under her name. During her lifetime six companies published compositions by King but bearing Rivé-King’s name. Her husband died in 1900 and she moved to Chicago and took a position at the Bush Conservatory of Music. Among her students was Clara Baur, founder of the Cincinnati Conservatory of Music.

== Works ==
Rivé-King composed mostly for piano.

- Chopin's Introduction and Variations on 'La ci darem la mano', Op.2 (transcription for solo piano of work originally for piano and orchestra) (1878)
- Gems of Scotland (1878)
- Hand in Hand (1878)
- On Blooming Meadows (1878) **
- Pensées dansantes (1878)
- Morgenblätter, paraphrase on J. Strauss' waltz Op. 279 (published c1878 wrongly attributed to Karl Tausig)
- Domenico Scarlatti's Sonata in A major transcription (1879)
- Vieuxtemps' Ballade and Polonaise de Concert transcription (1879)
- Old Hundred (1879)
- Bubbling Spring (1879) **
- Impromptu Mazurka (1879)
- March of the Goblins (1879)
- Mazurka des grâces - Caprice (1879)
- Polonaise héroïque (1879)
- Popular Sketches (1879)
- Coeur de lion March (1880)
- Supplication (1883) ***
- Home Sweet Home (Paraphrase) (1883) **
- La scintilla (1907)
- Paraphrase de Concert on Bizet's 'Carmen'
- Works marked ** were actually composed by Jacob Kunkel, her publisher, and published under her name.
- Works marked *** were actually composed by Charles Kunkel, her publisher, and published under her name.
