= Stockhausen (surname) =

Stockhausen is a German surname.

Notable people with the name include:

- Adam Stockhausen (born 1972), American production designer
- Adolf Stockhausen, German athlete, silver medalist of Rugby union at the 1900 Summer Olympics
- August von Stockhausen (1791–1861), Prussian Minister of War in 1850–1851
- Samuel Stockhausen, German 17th-century physician, studied the effects of lead poisoning
- Franz Anton Adam Stockhausen, German virtuoso harpist
  - Margarethe Stockhausen (1803–1877), soprano singer, wife of Franz
  - Julius Stockhausen (1826–1906), singer and singing teacher, son of Franz
  - Franz Stockhausen (1839–1926), pianist and conductor, son of Franz
- Karlheinz Stockhausen (1928–2007), German composer
  - Doris Stockhausen (1924–2023), German music educator, first wife of Karlheinz, mother of Markus
  - Markus Stockhausen (born 1957), trumpeter and composer, son of Karlheinz
  - Simon Stockhausen (born 1967), composer, son of Karlheinz
