= Stockhausen (disambiguation) =

Karlheinz Stockhausen (1928–2007) was a German composer.

Stockhausen may also refer to:

- Stockhausen (surname), including a list of people with the name
- Stockhausen (Sondershausen), a village in Sondershausen, a town in Thuringia, Germany
- Stockhausen, a subdivision of Eisenach, a town in Thuringia, Germany
- Stockhausen, a community in Herbstein, a town in Vogelsbergkreis, Hesse, Germany
- Stockhausen, a community in Leun, a town in Lahn-Dill-Kreis, Hesse, Germany
- Stockhausen, a district of Lübbecke, a town in the Minden-Lübbecke district of North Rhine-Westphalia, Germany
- Stockhausen, a district of Meschede, a town in the Hochsauerland district of North Rhine-Westphalia, Germany
- Stockhausen, a village in Windhagen, Rhineland-Palatinate, Germany
- Villa Stockhausen, a castle in Loschwitz, Dresden, Germany

== See also ==
- Stockhausen-Illfurth, a community in Rhineland-Palatinate, Germany
