= Anna Rüling =

German journalist (1880–1953)

- 1910 photograph
- Born: 15 August 1880
- Died: 8 May 1953 (aged 72)
- Occupation: Journalist

Theodora "Theo" Anna Sprüngli (15 August 1880 – 8 May 1953), better known under the pseudonym Anna Rüling, was a German journalist whose speech in 1904 was the first political speech to address the problems faced by lesbians. One of the first modern women to come out as homosexual, she has been described as "the first known lesbian activist".

== Early life and education ==
Rüling was born into a middle-class family in Hamburg, German Empire. Her parents were Adolf Sprüngli, a Swiss overseas businessman, and Caroline Sprüngli, née Dangers. Along with at least one sister, Rüling was raised in a "rigid atmosphere of a Hanseatic household". She attended a school for young ladies and, as deemed appropriate for a middle-class girl, received instructions in piano and music theory. She finished gymnasium in Stuttgart, where she took violin lessons from Edmund Singer, and was a schoolmate of Elly Ney. She was an accomplished violinist, but had to give this up after suffering an injury to her arm rescuing a child. Her career as a journalist began at the age of 17, when she started writing for Hamburger Fremdenblatt. Rüling moved to Berlin, where she worked for August Scherl for some time, writing newspaper articles on music and theatre, and earning some extra money from giving private music lessons.

== Homosexuality and activism ==
Rüling's family, unaware of her homosexuality, pressured her to marry. Rüling later spoke of lesbian aversion to marital relations with men, declaring that homosexual women married to men could find "no happiness" and would "be incapable of creating happiness." Although her father stated that "nothing of the sort can happen in my family", Rüling started a relationship with a woman by 1904 and took up activism. She was eager to see an alliance between LGBT campaigners and the growing women's rights movements, calling upon the latter to point out "how very destructive it is for homosexuals to enter into marriage."

The Scientific-Humanitarian Committee, the world's first LGBT advocacy group, invited Rüling to speak at its conference in Berlin on 9 October 1904. She was the only speaker that specifically addressed the issues faced by lesbians. She gave the speech "Homosexualitat und Frauenbewegung" (Homosexuality and the Women's Movement). She agreed with the then common view that the lesbian mindset is more similar to that of men than to that of other women. Despite her attempts to unite all victims of sex-based oppression, Rüling did not succeed in influencing women's rights campaigners to work for lesbian rights. Many lesbians at the time actively took part in promoting women's rights, but were shocked by Rüling's insistence on treating lesbian rights as a feminist issue.

If we weigh all the contributions which homosexual women have made to the Women's Movement, one would be astounded that its large and influential organizations have not lifted a finger to obtain justice in the state and in society for the not so small number of its [lesbian] members...

— Anna Rüling

Rüling believed that homosexuals constituted a third gender, distinct from men and women. She argued that homosexual women were more reasonable than "clearly heterosexual women", and that a lesbian, "like an average normal man, was more objective, more energetic and goal-oriented than the feminine woman." This, she claimed, made homosexual women well-suited for professional occupations. Her depiction of gender-nonconforming lesbian women, which she called an Urninde, was adopted by sexologists like Albert Moll. Many scholars believe her model of the Urninde helped create modern understandings of lesbianism.

What proved most controversial, however, were not her views themselves – it was her straightforward admission of her own homosexuality and evident taking pride in it. Her speech was the first political speech about lesbians. She was one of the first women to openly identify herself as homosexual, and has been called "the first lesbian activist", although the same is sometimes said about Johanna Elberskirchen. She is also known as an early lesbian feminist.

== Later career ==
On 27 October 1904, Rüling gave a speech to Friedrich Radszuweit's Bund für Menschenrecht, another organisation working advocating gay rights, and was briefly a member. Two years later, she published a collection of lesbian-themed short stories: Welcher unter euch ohne Sünde ist (Which among you is without sin?). These stories were unique at the time for containing happy endings to love stories between women.

Leaving Berlin, Rüling moved to Düsseldorf, where she lived for 30 years. In 1911, she joined the Scientific-Humanitarian Committee, as its fourth female "chairman" at the time. From 1914 until the mid-1920s, her writings were regularly published in Neue Deutsche Frauenzeitung, a right-wing paper with moderate views on women's rights.

During the First World War, Rüling proved to be an ardent patriot, nationalist and imperialist. It does not appear, however, that she ever joined the Nazi Party. She left Düsseldorf, as well as full-time journalism, in the late 1930s, moving to Ulm. There she worked as secretary, director and script-editor at the municipal theatre. A decade later, she relocated to Delmenhorst, continuing the theatre career but also resuming journalism in 1949. At the time of her sudden death on 8 May 1953, the 72-year-old Theo Anna Sprüngli ("Anna Rüling") was one of the oldest female journalists in the Federal Republic of Germany.
