= Georg Henschel =

Georg Henschel may refer to:

- Georg Christian Carl Henschel, founder of Henschel & Son
- George Henschel (Isidor Georg Henschel), musician
