= Chrétien Urhan =

French violinist, violist, organist and composer

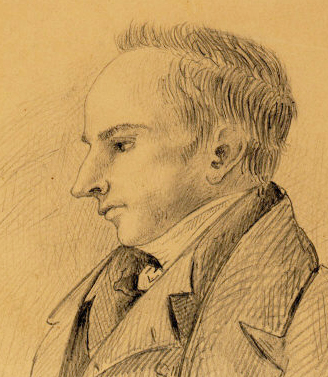
Chrétien Urhan

Chrétien Urhan (Baptised as Christian Urhan; 16 February 1790 – 2 November 1845) was a French violinist, violist, organist and composer.

== Career outline ==
Born in Montjoie, Urhan's father first introduced him to the violin. He was first publicly mentioned in 1804 by Joséphine de Beauharnais, having replaced a violinist for a performance of Joseph Haydn's The Creation, at the young age of 14. He was sent to work in Paris where he took instruction from Jean-François Le Sueur, master of the chapel of the Tuileries Palace. He also learned from prominent teachers such as François Habeneck, Rodolphe Kreutzer and Pierre Rode. He was invited to join the imperial chapel as a violinist in 1810.

In this period the young Urhan shared lodgings with his friends, the harpist Franz Anton Stockhausen (father of Julius Stockhausen), and the painter Carl Joseph Begas the elder (who was studying with Antoine-Jean Gros from 1813 to 15). In 1815, through a quartermaster in the Prussian army of occupation, Urhan and Stockhausen (who corresponded with Ludwig van Beethoven) obtained a score of Beethoven's Eroica Symphony and set it before Habeneck, with the result that the work was introduced to Paris. The two were among Amis de Beethoven, or Beethoven-Brüder in Paris, together with Wilhelm Mangold and others. In the early 1820s, the violinist Sina, a member of the string quartet led by Schuppanzigh for Andrey Razumovsky, gave Urhan new encouragement to continue with the master's works. Until Stockhausen's marriage to the singer Margarethe Schmuck, a member of their circle in 1825, he lived with Urhan, who remained a lifelong friend.

In 1816, Urhan was appointed solo viola at the Paris Opera, and became solo violinist in 1825. Strongly Catholic, he was also appointed organist at the Church of Saint Vincent de Paul in Paris in 1827, a position that he held until his death. In this position he met the young Franz Liszt, with whom he played chamber music including Beethoven's Kreutzer Sonata during a mass. A number of composers wrote works for Urhan. Giacomo Meyerbeer composed for him parts for solo viola and solo viola d'amore in his opera Les Huguenots, and Rodolphe Kreutzer, the part for solo viola d'amore in his opera Le Paradis de Mahomet. In 1834, Hector Berlioz wrote his Harold en Italie for orchestra with viola obbligato at the request of Niccolò Paganini, who refused to play the work. Berlioz offered the solo viola part to Urhan and the premiere was given on 23 November 1834 at the Paris Conservatory.

He died in Belleville aged 55.

== His character, seen by Ernest Legouvé ==
According to Ernest Legouvé, Urhan was both entirely religious and entirely devoted to music. He lived like a medieval ascetic, abstaining from almost everything except his daily visit to the Café des Anglais. His love for theatre music created a severe inner conflict, which he overcame by asking the permission of the Archbishop to play in the orchestra of the Opéra (of which he was leader), being told it was a matter for his own conscience. He accepted this by always being seated with his back to the stage, so that he never saw the singers or dancers for whom he played, even when providing solo accompaniment for a dancer.

He was in many other ways withdrawn and eccentric. He once visited Legouvé's wife and sat silently in her house for a time, and only as he left spoke, saying "Thank you, I needed to come and see you". On another occasion, while walking in the Bois de Boulogne, a voice came into his mind and instructed him to write down a tune. He did so, and published it, but refused to be credited as its author, calling it "transcription", and insisting that Legouvé write an article on the miraculous composition.

However, no-one thought of laughing at him, because he led such an austere life and gave everything he earned to charity. His dignity, not for himself but for the music he served, was proverbial. When a beautiful young duchess made a slight commotion entering a concert given by the Marquis de Prault at the Faubourg Saint-Honoré, during a Beethoven string ensemble movement led by Urhan, the violinist rapped with his bow to stop the music and waited for total silence before restarting the movement.

Legouvé thought there were several greater violin virtuosi in Paris than Urhan, but that he outshone them through his profound knowledge of the masters and respect for their music, and through the indefinable quality of style which he brought to them. He often differed with Habeneck, when the conductor wanted to make cuts, and actually published and signed an article against Habeneck when he withdrew some double-basses from Beethoven's Choral Symphony. He did not merely guard the reputation of the old masters, but he was also a fierce advocate and defender of the new, and of those of the future. He was the first to introduce a song of Schubert's into France (L'Adieu). For Legouvé, to see him play was like watching Fra Angelico painting in his cell, a medieval mystic at work.

== Later life and death ==
The Stockhausens visited Urhan in his fifth-floor Paris apartment in 1839 and found him living in great simplicity in two rooms, with a piano and five stools in his bedroom, where they sat and were made very welcome. In 1843, Urhan encouraged their son Julius while he was in Paris. In November 1845, Julius Stockhausen wrote to inform his parents of Urhan's death. He had been living in pitiable conditions in Belleville, and began to refuse his food: thoughts of suicide made him resolve to starve himself to death. He suffered agonies of pain and descended into a frenzy, giving terrible grief to his friends, none of whom could talk him out of it. All interventions failed, and Urhan, whom the Stockhausen and Legentil families considered their dear friend, and who had formerly taken communion every Sunday, lost his faith in God and his desire for life. Thus he died, quietly at last with friends at his bedside, on 2 November 1845.

== Compositions ==
The following is a small selection of his large number of works for chamber ensembles.

- Three Grand Walzes for piano
- Two romantic quintets for 2 violins, 2 violas and cello, dedicated to Baillot and Victor Hugo
- Three romantic duos for piano (4 hands)
- The cantata Les Champs de repos

== Image ==
- Anonymous oil portrait (black and white reproduction), in Wirth 1927, Plate facing p. 32.

== Sources ==
This article began as a translation of the article in French Wikipedia.

- Ernest Legouvé: Soixante ans de souvenirs (Paris, 1886–87), part II, ch. 8. (see external links).
- Ulrich Schuppener: Christian Urhan. Zum 200. Geburtstag des bedeutenden Musikers aus Monschau (= Beiträge zur Geschichte des Monschauer Landes, vol. 2) (Monschau: Geschichtsverein des Monschauer Landes, 1991).
- Julia Wirth: Julius Stockhausen. Der Sänger des Deutschen Liedes (Frankfurt am Main: Englert und Schlosser, 1927).
