= Chalmers Clifton =

American conductor and composer

Chalmers Dancy Clifton (April 30, 1889, Jackson, Mississippi – June 19, 1966, New York City) was an American conductor and composer.

He was born in Jackson, Mississippi. From 1903 to 1908 he studied at the Cincinnati Conservatory. Through his association with the conservatory, he met and eventually married administrator Wanda Baur, niece of the conservatory's founder Clara Baur. He continued music studies at Harvard, graduating summa cum laude. He held various conducting posts in New England during this time, including directing the first MacDowell Festival in 1910.

He won Harvard's Sheldon Travelling Fellowship in 1912, using it to spend two years in Paris studying with Gedalge and d'Indy. He spent much of the next decade in France, joining the American Expeditionary Forces, conducting all-American programs in Paris. He maintained friendships with Judith Gautier and with d'Indy, whose music he actively promoted in the United States.

He was a founder and first musical director of the American Orchestral Society from 1922 to 1930; during this tenure he helped young musicians in New York prepare for being in orchestras across the country. Virgil Thomson, to whom Clifton would later award the Pulitzer Prize, was one of his students.

He taught conducting at Columbia University. He was actively involved with the Federal Music Project from 1935-1939 during the depression. The Cincinnati Conservatory awarded him an honorary Doctor of Music degree in 1940.

He chaired the music jury awarding the first 18 Pulitzers Prize in Music, from 1943 to 1960. In 1947 he was the sole jurist, recommending the award to Charles Ives.

He wrote a number of orchestral and chamber music works. He served on the advisory music committee of the Society for the Publication of American Music. Lila Cabot Perry painted his portrait in 1915.
