= Emma Heckle =

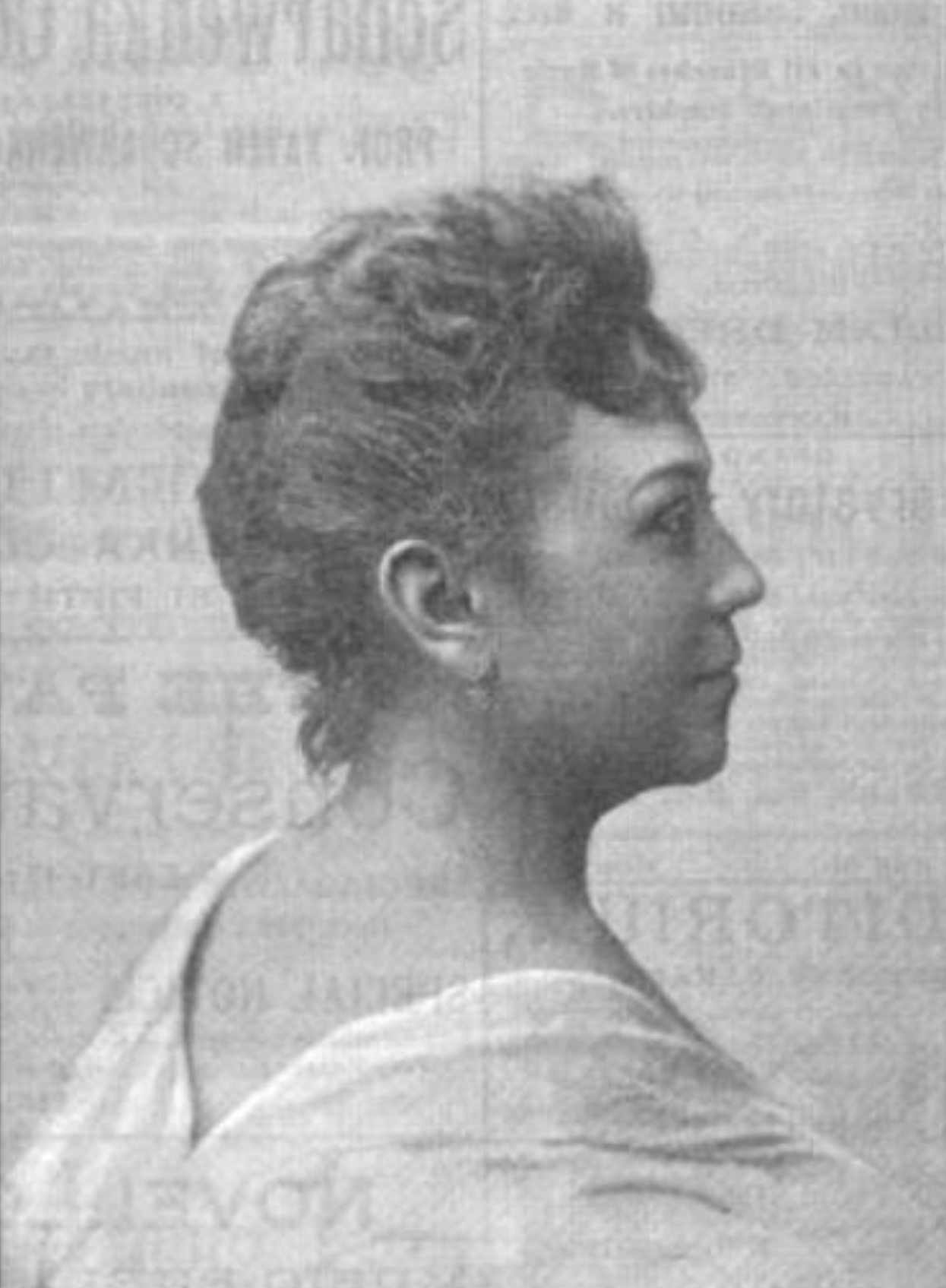
Emma L. Heckle from the front cover of The Musical Courier on November 4, 1891.

Emma Louis Heckle (21 December 1850 - 21 April 1941) was an American soprano and voice teacher. A native of Cincinnati, Ohio, she was educated at the Cincinnati Conservatory of Music where she also became a professor of voice and a co-director of that institution. She was a frequent soloist at the Cincinnati May Festival in the 19th century, and also had an active career on the national concert stage in the United States, and on stages in Europe.

== Life and career ==
Emma Louis Heckle was born on 21 December 1850 in Cincinnati, Ohio. The daughter of Helena Heckle of Baden, Germany, her mother had worked as a soprano in Freiburg im Breisgau. Emma was trained at the Cincinnati Conservatory of Music (CCM) where she was a voice student of Clara Baur. Emma joined the voice faculty of the CCM in 1870 and was by then well known locally as a concert soprano. having begun her career at the age of 18. She continued to teach at the CCM until 1878 when she left to pursue further studies in Europe. She went to Frankfurt, Germany where she was a pupil of Julius Stockhausen.

Heckle was a featured singer in the first Cincinnati May Festival (CMF) in 1873. In 1876 she was the soprano soloist in both Felix Mendelssohn's Elijah and George Frideric Handel's Messiah at the CMF. In December 1876 she gave a series of concerts with pianist Sally Liebling at Pike's Music Hall. In 1878 she had the honor of being the first soloist to perform in the newly constructed Cincinnati Music Hall; a concert in which she performed an aria from Christoph Willibald Gluck's Alceste. That same year she performed with Louis M. Ballenberg's Cincinnati Orchestra (no relation to the current orchestra which was founded later). She returned from her studies in Germany in May 1879 to once again perform as a soloist at the CMF. She remained a "fixture" at the CMF for the remainder of her performance career, and also performed regularly with ensembles in Cincinnati like the Vereinigten Saenger and Harmonie choruses.

Heckle moved to Chicago in the early 1880s where she was a resident soprano at David Swing's Central Church. In December 1881 she appeared at Chicago's Central Music Hall as Marguerite in Hector Berlioz s La Damnation de Faust with the New York Symphony Society led by Theodore Thomas. That same month she was the soprano soloist in Handel's Messiah at a music festival held on the campus of the University of Michigan. In 1882 she was a soloist in Niels Gade's oratorio The Crusaders in Milwaukee. In 1887 she was engaged by conductor Patrick Gilmore for performances with his band at Manhattan Beach.

In February 1891 Heckle gave a concert at Steinway Hall(SH) in New York City with pianist Leopold Winkler and baritone Joseph Lynde. The following month she performed in a concert at Vassar College led by Frédéric Louis Ritter. In April 1891 she performed as a soloist in the festival that inaugurated the opening of Carnegie Hall; performing lieder with Leopold Godowsky as her accompanist. The following September she performed Charles Gounod's "Ave Maria" and the arias for the character of Countess Almaviva from Mozart's The Marriage of Figaro with conductor Anton Seidl and the orchestra of the Metropolitan Opera at Madison Square Garden. She returned to the SH in 1892 to give another concert with baritone Ferdinand Fechter, cellist Rudolph Nagel, and pianist Jacques Friedberger. She continued to give annual recitals in New York at the SH in subsequent years. In the summer of 1893 she was the soprano soloist in the concert tour of the Liederkranz of the City of New York. In 1895 she gave a recital at the Waldorf-Astoria.

At the invitation of Cosima Wagner, Heckle spent time living and studying at the Wahnfried (Richard Wagner's home) in Bayreuth in the 1890s. She was active as a concert soprano in Europe, and was a friend of both Lilli Lehmann and Clara Schumann.

After retiring from performance in the early 1900s, Heckle returned to teaching at the CCM where she ultimately became co-director of the institution.

She died at St. Theresa Home in Cincinnati on April 21, 1941.
