= Olga Radecki =

Russian composer, conductor, and pianist

Olga Mathilde Agnes von Radecki (23 August 1858 - 2 February 1933) was a Russian composer, conductor, and pianist who studied with Clara Schumann and performed with the Boston Symphony several times.

Radecki was born in Riga (today in Latvia), the eleventh of twelve children born to Mathilde Haarmann and Ottokar Heinrich von Radecki. She studied music in Riga, then in Stuttgart at the Royal Conservatory of Music (today the State University of Music and Performing Arts Stuttgart), and in Frankfurt am Main at the Hoch Conservatory, where she joined Mary Wurm in the first composition class the Conservatory opened to women. In addition to Clara Schumann, her teachers included Sigmund Lebert, Dionys Pruckner, Joachim Raff, Julius Ruthardt, and Ludwig Stark.

In 1882, Radecki moved to Boston, Massachusetts, where on November 4, 1882, she debuted as a pianist with the Boston Symphony Orchestra conducted by George Henschel. She appeared with the orchestra twice more during that concert season and again in 1886 and 1907.

Radecki's first piano recital in Boston was on January 26, 1883, when she appeared with violinist Bernhard Friedrich Wilhelm Listemann, cellist Ernst Schmidt, and pianist Mary Eliza O’Brion. The program included one of her own compositions, a piano trio. A reviewer for the Boston Daily Advertiser noted on 27 January 1883, “What is so rare as a woman composer! And when a young lady scarcely escaped from her pupilage is able to do such a creditable piece of original work as this, what may we not hope for the sex in this field.”

Radecki and O’Brion performed together frequently over the next few years, appearing with Boston Symphony in 1883, at Ashburnham and Boston in 1884, and at Boston's Chickering Hall with the singer Lillian Henschel.

In 1886, Radecki returned to Europe and gave several concerts in Riga. While there, she received the Mendelssohn Scholarship for performing musicians. In December 1886, Radecki returned to Boston and appeared at Bumstead Hall with the singer Gertrude Franklin. In 1889, Radecki moved back to Riga and worked there for the next few years as a pianist, teacher, and composer, as well as a choirmaster and conductor. In late 1903, she conducted a performance of Haydn's oratorio The Seasons with soloists A. von Fossard (tenor), Georg Stahlberg (bass), and Mrs. Baldur (soprano). She also performed her own compositions in piano recitals, and accompanied Bronislaw Huberman on violin. Radecki returned to Boston in 1906 where she continued to perform on piano recitals and made her final appearance with the Boston Symphony on May 2, 1907.

Radecki composed piano music and songs which were published by Arthur P. Schmidt. They included:

== Chamber ==
- Piano Trio

== Piano ==
- Fresh Green
- Six Pieces
- Sonata in e minor
- Tarantella in f minor
- Tarantelle
- Three Impromptus
- Variations on an Original Theme
- Wanderlust

== Vocal ==
- “A Widow Bird Sat Mourning”
- “As Birds Soar High”
- “Baby Song”
- “Boat Song”
- “Four Songs”
- “I Gazed Upon Her Picture”
- “Morning and Evening by the Sea”
- “The Night has a Thousand Eyes”
- “The Sea Hath Its Pearls”
- “When Stars Are in the Quiet Skies”
