= Ödön Singer =

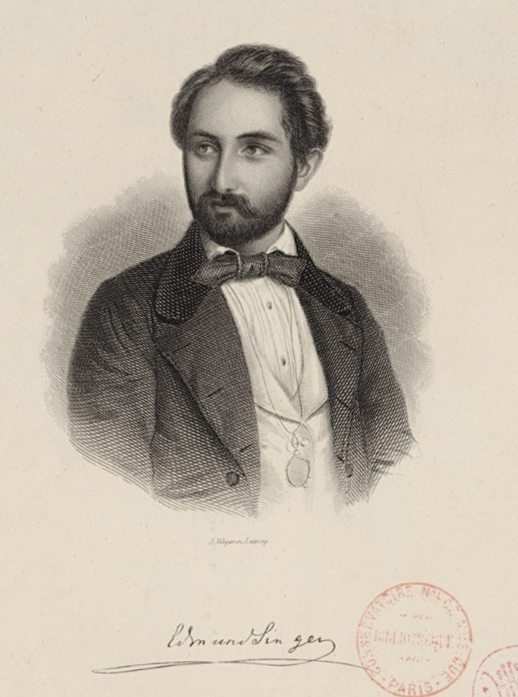
Edmund Singer

Ödön Singer (14 October 1830 – 23 January 1912), also known as Edmund Singer, was a Hungarian virtuoso violinist and composer.

He was born in Tata, Hungary in 1830 and studied under Joseph Böhm in Vienna. He was a childhood friend of Joseph Joachim. After being recommended by Franz Liszt to the court he became concertmaster of the Weimar orchestra in 1854.

In 1861 was offered the same position in the orchestra at the court of Stuttgart/ Württemberg. There he also became a professor at the newly founded conservatoire and established one of the leading concert series dedicated to the performance of chamber music. Under his leadership the Singer-Quartett established itself as one of Germany's foremost string quartet's, as mirrored by the contemporary press that gave their concerts nationwide coverage. Members of the group where at various times the violinists Hugo Wehrle and Barnbeck, the viola players Debuysere and Wien and the cellists Julius Cabisius, Carl Theodor Krumbholz and Georg Goltermann.

Other musicians he held in high were the pianist Dionys Prucker, who also taught at Stuttgart and the composer Joachim Raff, who dedicated a number of his compositions to him.

One of his regular accompanists was the pianist Anna Mehlig who was a pupil of fellow professor Sigmund Lebert. He started performing with her while she was still a student at the conservatoire and he continued to champion her even after she had moved to Antwerp some twenty years later. In 1876 they travelled together to Milan to play a series of concerts together with the cellist Friedrich Grützmacher. These concerts were such a success that international newspapers praised the trio's ability to capture their audience with their music.

In 1881 his series of concerts for chamber music celebrated its 20th anniversary. The press feted him for championing chamber music, an art form that never paid as well for performers as other genres of music did. That he was nevertheless focusing his attention on it was well recognized by his contemporaries.

To honor his work he was named musician to the Royal chambers in 1864.

He was one of the founding members of the "Stuttgarter Tonkünstlerverein", a union of musicians that is safeguarding the rights of performers and composers.

Highly respected and acclaimed he died in Stuttgart, Germany in 1912.

== Works ==
He composed a number of violin pieces:

"Le Carneval hongrois" op.15, A-Dur, 1852

"Le Sentimentale" op.13, 1852

Together with Wilhelm Speidel he published a two volume collection of Ludwig van Beethoven's violin sonatas. With Max Seifriz he wrote a "Grosse theoretisch-praktische Violinschule", a violin school that was used for teaching the violin.
