= Anna Mehlig =

German pianist (1846–1928)

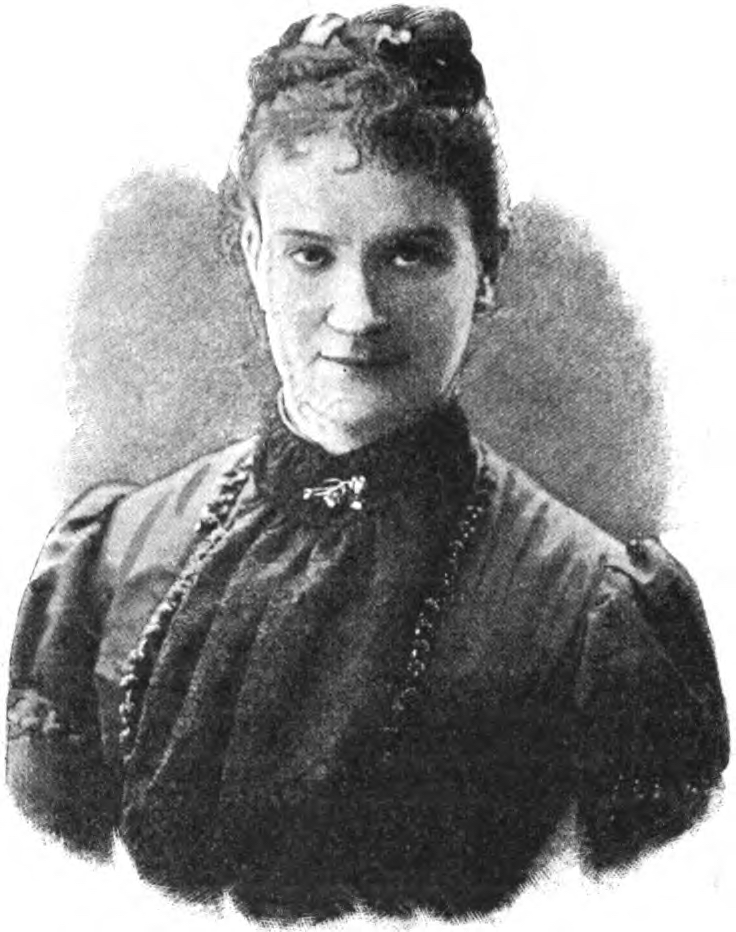

Background information
- Also known as: Anna Falk-Mehlig
- Born: Anna Caroline Emilie Mehlig; 11 June 1846; Stuttgart, Germany
- Died: 20 July 1928 (aged 82) Berlin, Germany
- Genre: Romantic music
- Occupations: Composer; pianist
- Instrument: Piano
- Works: Interpretations of Liszt, Chopin and von Weber
- Years active: c. 1860s – 1913
- Awards: New York Philharmonic (hon. membership, 1870); Order of Frederick (1897)

Anna Mehlig (11 June 1846 – 20 July 1928), also known by her married name, Anna Falk-Mehlig, was a German composer and pianist who excelled with her interpretations of Franz Liszt, Frédéric Chopin and Carl Maria von Weber. She was a pupil of Sigmund Lebert and a close musical ally of Liszt. Through her extensive tours of the United States she became one of the most celebrated pianists of her age. At the height of her fame she was awarded an honorary membership of the New York Philharmonic in 1870.

== Biography ==
Anna Mehlig was born in Stuttgart in 1846 to Heinrich Mehlig and Emilie Mehlig (née List) as the first of five children. Her father was a choir singer at the Royal Opera House of the Court of Württemberg and he gave her the first music lessons. In 1857, Mehlig was accepted as a student at the newly-founded conservatory of music at Stuttgart; awarded a scholarship, as a pupil of Sigmund Lebert, the most prominent piano teacher at the Conservatory.

Media reports soon flowed claiming the Mehlig was one of the most promising piano students of her generation. Her first concert tours were to Munich, Frankfurt and Leipzig where she played at the prestigious Gewandhaus, often performing with the violinist Simon E. Jacobsohn. Her first international tours were to the Netherlands and England in 1866 where she played under Sir Arthur Sullivan. In 1869 she received additional teaching from Franz Liszt who awarded her with a manuscript of his famous Hexameron.

As her fame grew, Steinway, who was promoting his business by engaging the most brilliant performers of his time as testimonials for his grand pianos, invited Mehlig to the United States. She was enthusiastically received by the American public in 1869, where she performed alongside with Jacobsohn. Mehlig toured extensively with Theodore Thomas and his orchestra for three consecutive years. This led her to perform in New York, Boston, Philadelphia, Wheeling, Titusville, Portland, Chicago, Baltimore, Providence, Worcester, St. Louis, Louisville and Washington D.C. At one of her concerts in 1870 the author Henry Wadsworth Longfellow heard her playing, which he recorded in his diary. A special highlight was her two-month stay on the U.S. west coast in 1872, where she played in San Francisco and Portland. A decade later, her playing was still regarded as a benchmark against which other performers were measured. She gave a number of concerts where she played alongside Clara Louise Kellogg and Antoinette Sterling who she had first met in London in 1866 and who continued to be her friends in later years.

After three years in the U.S., Mehlig returned to Stuttgart, from where she continued her extensive tours. Her regular musical partners were David Popper, Friedrich Grützmacher, Wilma Norman-Neruda, Pablo de Sarasate, Franz Servais, Peter Benoit, August Manns, Arthur Sullivan, Robert Hausmann, Sims Reeves and Sir Julius Benedict.

Media reports varied on her style. Some English-language newspapers offered almost unqualified praise: “...the greatest female piano performer ever heard in the city…”, German reviews fluctuated between criticism of a lack of musical expression and enthusiasm: “She is undoubtedly the most ingenious piano player of the present day...” but “...technique and intellect alone do not make today’s piano playing interesting enough; it must also be linked to emotional expression if the performance is to leave a lasting impression”; and: “Mlle Mehlig may be classed as a pianist of the old school, very close and correct in her reading of the text, with a beautifully light and liquid touch.”

In 1880 she married Rudolf Alexander Oscar Falk, a German-born Antwerp merchant and they had two sons. During the Liszt Festivals in 1881 and 1885 she was the celebrated performer of his First Piano Concerto. In 1897 Mehlig received the Gold Medal for Art and Science with the Order of Frederick from the King of Württemberg, and the "Bene merenti" from the Prince of Hohenzollern. Her last documented performances took place in London (1910) and Antwerp (1913).

With the outbreak of the First World War, Mehlig was forced to flee Belgium and settled in Berlin, where she died in 1928.

Her public performances are currently being catalogued in a research project.
