= Lillian Henschel =

American soprano

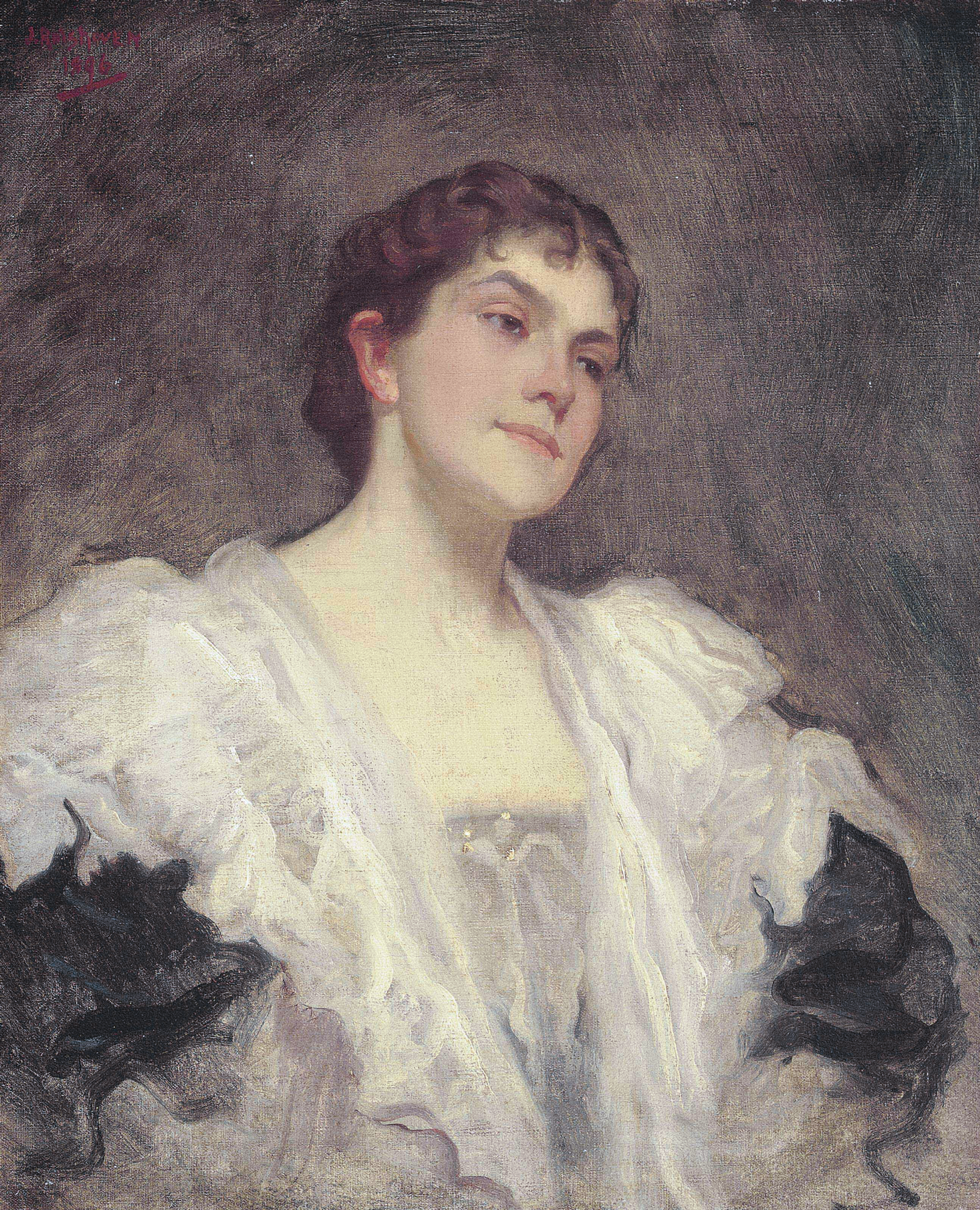
Portrait of Henschel by Julius Rolshoven

Lillian June Henschel (born Lillian June Bailey) (January 17, 1860 – November 4, 1901) was an American soprano.

Lillian Bailey was born in Columbus, Ohio on 17 January 1860 and was said to have demonstrated musical talent from an early age. She took piano lessons from the age of seven and had vocal training from her mother who was also a trained singer. When she was 15, the family moved to Boston and she continued her studies under her uncle, Charles Hayden, a well-known vocal teacher and later she became a pupil of Erminia Rudersdorf, with whom she studied two years.

At sixteen, Bailey made her professional debut in Boston at one of B. J. Lang's concerts, meeting with great success. After this she became a favorite singer in Boston, and her services were in constant demand during the concert season. She appeared in recital with pianist Olga Radecki, among others. She then traveled to Paris, in 1887 where she studied with Pauline Viardot-Garcia. On April 30, 1879, she was among the performers in an orchestral concert in London, singing a solo number and a duet with George Henschel; he became her teacher, and married her on March 9, 1881. Upon his appointment as conductor of the Boston Symphony Orchestra, she joined him, performing at orchestra concerts and as a solo recitalist with her husband as accompanist. She died in London.
