= Friedrich Grützmacher =

German cellist and composer

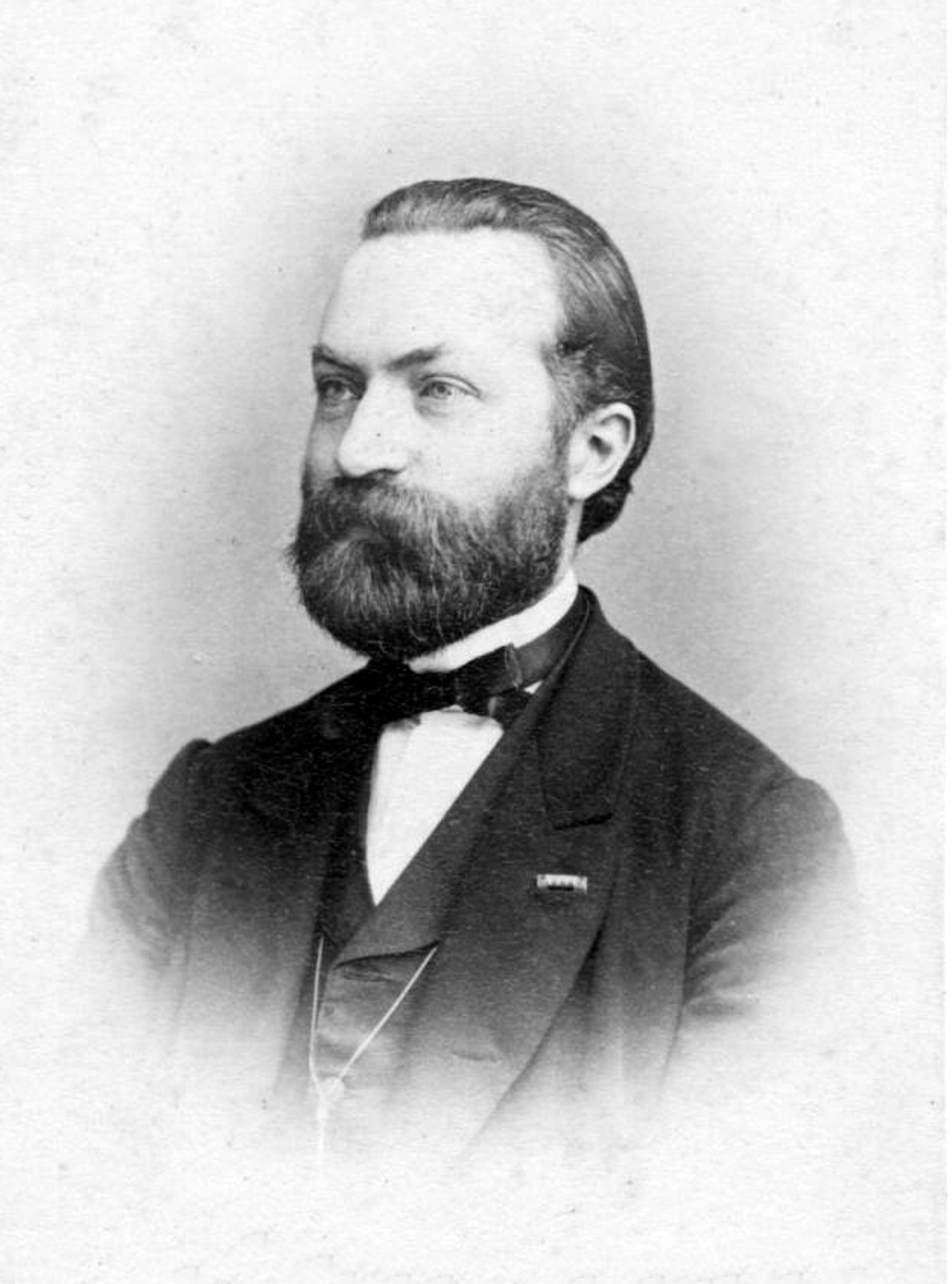
Portrait of Friedrich Wilhelm Grützmacher

Friedrich Wilhelm Ludwig Grützmacher (1 March 1832 – 23 February 1903) was a German cellist and composer in the second half of the 19th century. He composed mostly for cello (including several concertos and many technical studies), but also wrote orchestral pieces, chamber music, piano music and songs.

== Life ==
Grützmacher was born in Dessau, Anhalt, and was first taught by his father. Soon he began studying cello with Dotzauer's pupil, Karl Drexler (1800–1873).

In 1848, he was discovered in Leipzig by the famous violinist, Ferdinand David, who arranged some concerts for him. In 1850, he became solo cellist in the Leipzig theatre orchestra, the Gewandhaus Concerts, and professor at the Leipzig Conservatory. He played in the David String Quartet.

In 1860, Grützmacher moved to Dresden to be principal cellist of the court orchestra, and head of the Dresden Musical Society. In 1877, he became a professor at the Dresden Conservatory. He concertized all over Europe and Imperial Russia, where he became a friend of the famous cellist Karl Davydov. In 1876 he played a couple of concerts in Milan together with the violinist Edmund Singer and the pianist Anna Mehlig. Anna Mehlig was one of his favorite pianists who he got to know well during their time in Bernard Ullmann's concert tours, in which they played together in 1871. The contemporary press was enthusiastic about the trio's ability to perform chamber music at the highest level and they managed to sway even the Italian audience which was known to be particularly critical.

After this success Grützmacher and Mehlig toured the Baltics in 1877. They performed Beethoven's cello sonata and Chopin's composition for piano and cello in Dorpat, Reval and Königsberg to critical acclaim.

He played the first performance of Richard Strauss's Don Quixote in Cologne in 1898. He was the teacher of Wilhelm Fitzenhagen and Hugo Becker whose editions are still used.

Grützmacher is most famous today for taking samples of four different works to form his edition of Luigi Boccherini's Concerto in B-flat, still being published and performed. He is also known for rearranging J. S. Bach's Cello Suites with additional chords, passages and embellishments. His cadenzas for the cello concertos by Boccherini and Joseph Haydn are often performed to this day. He made frequent tours throughout Europe and Russia as a solo cellist and chamber musician.

== Sources ==
- Grutzmacher short Biography
- Free scores by Friedrich Grützmacher at the International Music Score Library Project (IMSLP)
