= Florian Wiek =

Born in 1972, Florian Wiek was scholarship-holder of Villa Musica in Mainz from 1994 to 1997 where he performed chamber music with leading German musicians like Thomas Brandis, Ida Bieler, Martin Ostertag, Wolfgang Gaag and Rainer Moog. Together with his partner Justus Grimm, Wiek was elected for the 44th and 46th 'Bundesauswahl junger Künstler' in Germany and played a large number of sonata recitals.

In 2001 Wiek played Schumann's Piano Quintet in concert together with the violinist Ivry Gitlis, among others.

In October 2004 he became professor for piano and chamber music at the State University of Music and Performing Arts Stuttgart.

Moreover, he had collaborated with his Master Classes in Magister Musicae project.

== Discography ==
- Bonis, Mélanie (June 10, 2008). La joueuse de flute : romantic flute music [The joy of flute]. Tatjana Ruhland; Florian Wiek; Radio-Sinfonieorchester Stuttgart. Stuttgart, Germany: Hanssler Classics. ASIN B0016YFNWY. OCLC 232133659.
- Gaubert, Philippe; Trio Wiek (January 12, 2010). Chamber music. Christina Fassbender; Justus Grimm; Florian Wiek. Belgium: Fuga Libera. ASIN B0026JWEJS. OCLC 547232526.
