= Gertrude Franklin =

American singer and music educator (1858–1913)

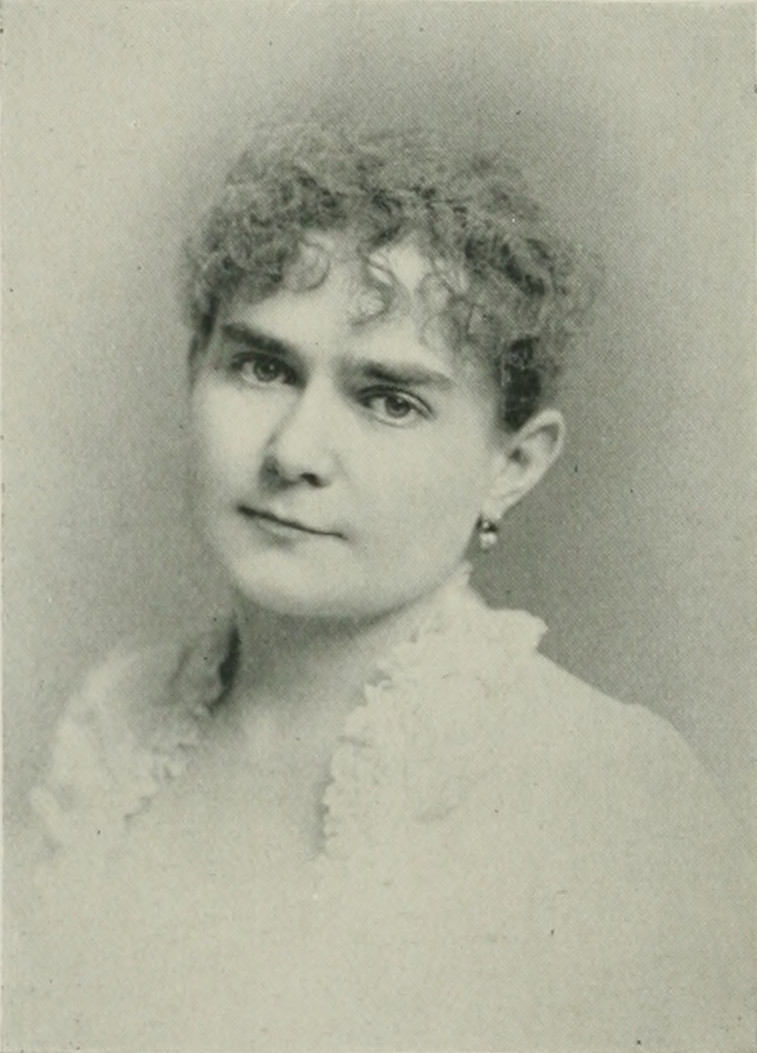
Gertrude Franklin, A Woman of the Century

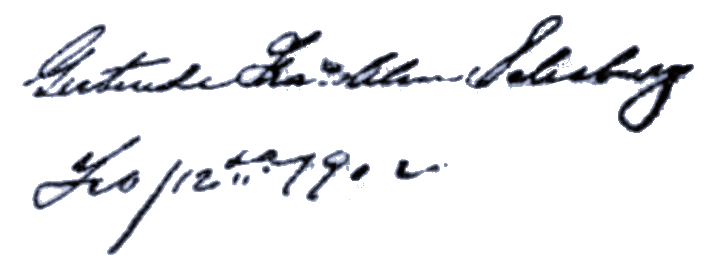
signature, dated Feb. 12, 1902

Gertrude Franklin (September 4, 1858 – April 1, 1913) was an American singer and music educator. Born Virginia H. Beatty, she was better known to the musical world as Gertrude Franklin, a name she took when she first became a professional singer. In private life, she was known as Virginia Beatty Salisbury. For a period of about 30 years, Franklin sang in concert and oratorio in many cities. She had the largest repertoire of any American singer in her day, also the largest collection of arias and orchestra scores for the concert stage. After marriage, she gave up concert work and became one of the most widely- and favorably-known of Boston's vocal teachers.

== Early life and education ==
Virginia H. Beatty was born in Baltimore, Maryland, September 4, 1858. She descended from a wealthy and distinguished family. Her father, John Beatty, of Baltimore was the son of James Beatty, an eminent merchant and millionaire of Baltimore, who held positions of great trust under President James Madison. Her mother, Mrs. Elizabeth Jackson Beatty, was the daughter of the Rev. William Jackson, a native of England. Among other distinguished ancestors was her great-grandfather, Gunning Bedford Jr., who, for a short time in the Revolutionary War, was aide-de-camp to General George Washington. He represented Delaware in the Continental Congress, 1783 to 1786, and was a prominent member of the convention that framed the Constitution of the United States. Franklin had at least one sibling, a brother, who became a physician of Philadelphia.

Franklin's parents moved to Boston when she was four years old. Her early general education was received in public and private schools in that city. Her musical education began when she was a young girl, and at the age of thirteen, she gave promise of being a brilliant pianist. Her taste, however, was for vocal music rather than instrumental, and, prompted by natural inclination and the possession of a voice of remarkable sweetness and purity, she began to take lessons in singing.

Aaron Taylor and Emilio Agramonte were her first teachers. On the advice of the latter, she went to Europe to continue her musical education. She went to London and became a pupil of tenor William Shakespeare, and then to Paris for two years, where she became a pupil of Anna de La Grange. She also studied with Professor Joseph-Théodore-Désiré Barbot, of the Conservatoire de Paris.

Before leaving Paris, Franklin appeared in a concert in the Salle Érard and achieved success, which was emphasized by immediate offers of concert engagements, and an offer from the Italian opera management for a season of opera. But Franklin had made arrangements to go to London to study oratorio and English ballad music under Alberto Randegger, who was so pleased with her voice and method that he asked her to remain and make a career in England. Eager to return home after her prolonged absence, Franklin declined that, and also an offer from Carl Rosa to join his Carl Rosa Opera Company in England. After her return to the U.S., she took an extended course of study under Madame Erminia Rudersdorff for oratorio and the more serious range of classical concert music.

== Career ==
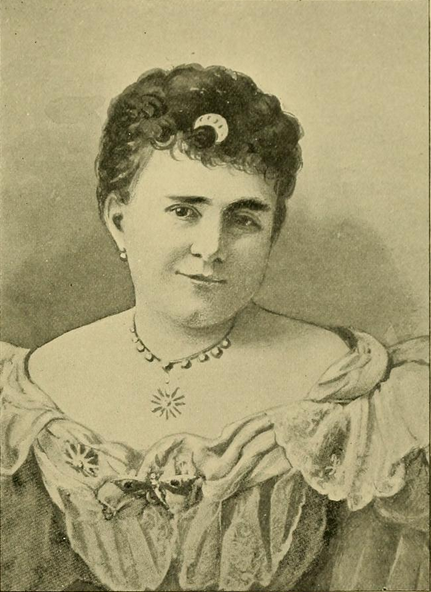
No later than 1897.

Franklin appeared in New York City, Boston, and Brooklyn in symphony concerts, and in classical and other concerts tn most of the leading cities in the U.S. with success. She also sung in London and Paris, where her artistic worth was perhaps more appreciated than it is in her own country. Her work was under the leadership of Theodore Thomas, Walter Damrosch, Emil Paur, Karlberg, Henschel, Gericke, Nikisch, Tomlins, and Gilchrist. In addition to her fine voice, her concert work was notable due to the extent of her repertoire. She sang in French, German, Italian and English, and had the distinction of having the largest repertoire of any American singer in her day, also the largest collection of arias and orchestra scores for the concert stage. Franklin never repeated a programme in the same place, or an aria, unless called upon at a moment's notice to sing without rehearsal.

For several years she was soloist at King's Chapel. Several seasons, she sang with the Handel and Haydn Society and with the Boston Symphony Orchestra, and appeared in recital with pianist Olga Radecki. She received many offers for opera and concert tours in Europe and the U.S., but objected to the fatigue and excitement of travel and did not appear before the public as often as she otherwise could. Being financially independent, she preferred the quiet of home and occasional appearances in important concerts.

In Brookline, Massachusetts, April 8, 1896, she married W. C. G. Salisbury, of Boston, and retired from public life to devote her time to teaching. As an instructor, she was even more successful than as a singer. Her pupils were on the operatic, concert and oratorio stages in Europe and America.

== Death ==
The family home was in Philadelphia, but she spent most of her professional life in Boston. Franklin died on April 1, 1913, while in the business office of The Boston Journal.
