= Silvia Görres =

German non-fiction writer and psychotherapist (1925–2015)

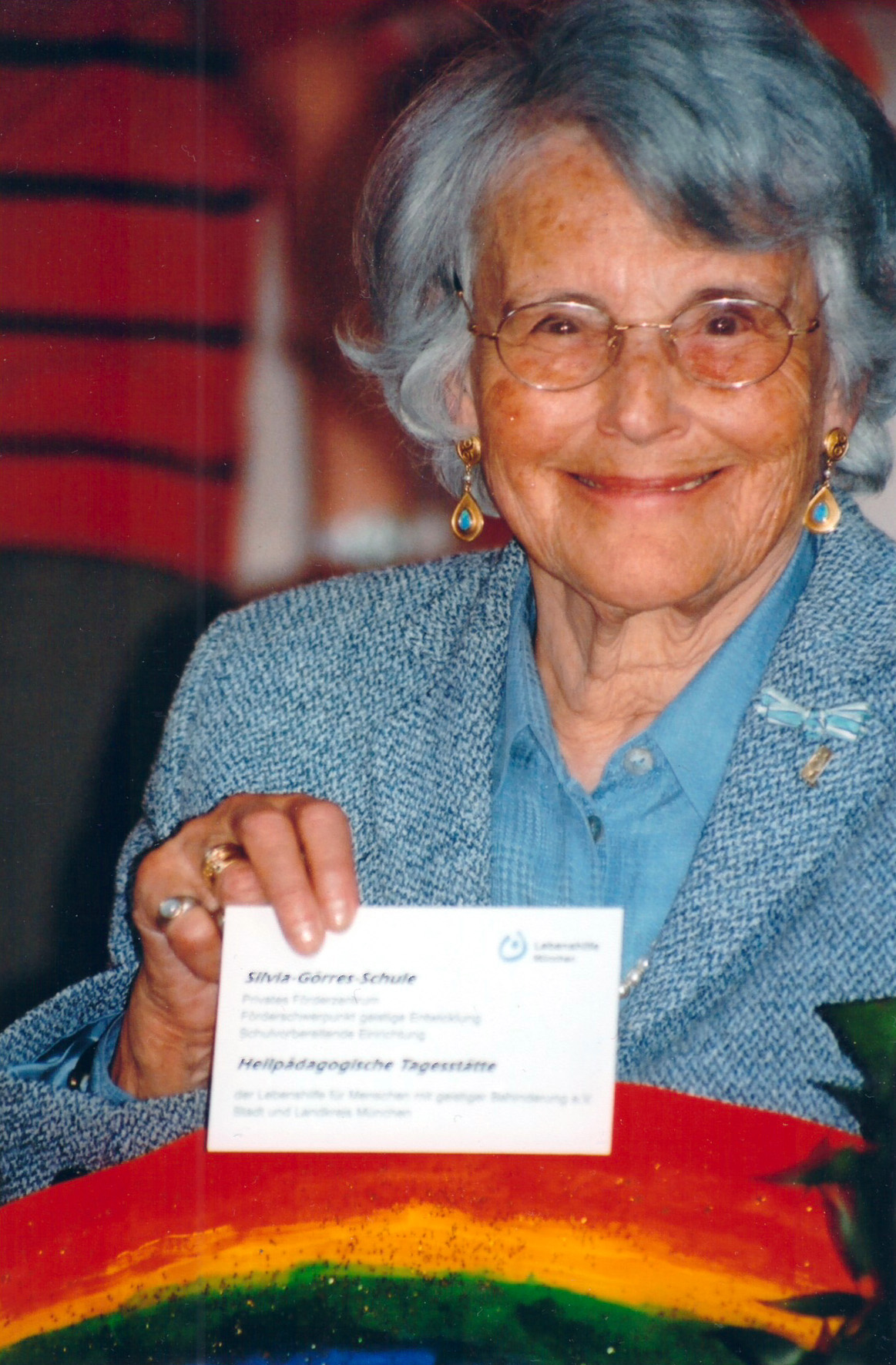
- 2004
- Born: Silvia Regina Volkart; 11 September 1925; Stuttgart, Germany
- Died: 14 January 2015 (aged 89); Munich, Germany
- Occupation(s): psychotherapist author mental health charity pioneer
- Spouse: Albert Görres
- Children: 7
- Parent(s): Hans Volkart; Käthe Volkart-Schlager

Silvia Görres (née Volkart; 11 September 1925 – 14 January 2015) was a German psychotherapist and author. In 1967 she became involved as a volunteer with Lebenshilfe München, a regional (and national) charity involved in mental health. Starting in 1971 she became chair of the organisation's Bavarian executive board, successfully backing a number of projects and practical initiatives to improve the quality of life for the mentally impaired.

== Life ==
Silvia Regina Volkart was born in Stuttgart, the third recorded child of Hans Volkart, an architect and university teacher, and his wife Kathe Volkart-Schlager, a composer. Between 1944 and 1949 she attended Tübingen University where she studied philosophy, psychology and pedagogy. Between 1949 and 1952 she completed her psychoanalytical training with Alexander Mitscherlich at his Institute for Psychosomatic Medicine and Psychotherapy at Heidelberg. She was then ready to set up her own psychotherapy practice, which she did in 1953, continuing to treat patients till approximately 1990.

In 1950 Silvia Volkart married the psychoanalyst and psychotherapist Albert Görres, who was one of several younger members of the profession closely associated with Alexander Mitscherlich at Heidelberg. The marriage produced seven recorded children, of whom two were affected by Down syndrome.

In 1967 she began to volunteer for the Munich Lebenshilfe charity. In 1971 she became chair of the Munich-based regional executive. She later also joined the organisation's national executive board, which was based in Marburg.

The Munich Lebenshilfe lists various practical support initiatives that Silvia Volkart had already launched by 1980 in order to support the mentally impaired:

- Early years support for children during their first four years
- Two school preparation institutions providing curative teaching and daycare for children from the age of three
- A school with special needs daycare provision for children with severe and multiple impairment (today renamed as the "Silvia Görres School")
- A "Lebenshilfe" workshop
- The organisation's first residential homes for adults with impairments
- The organisation's first residential group
- Publicising work for the handicapped
- Parents' advice service
- The periodical publication L.I.E.S (Lebenshilfe in eigener Sache)

== Awards and honours ==
Silvia Görres' voluntary work did not go unrecognised.

- 1975: Bavarian Order of Merit
- 2003: Father Rupert Mayer medal
- 2004: Inauguration of the "Silvia Görres School" in Munich
- 2005: Constitution Medal in Gold
- 2008: Order of Merit of the Federal Republic of Germany "am Bande"

== Output (selection) ==
- Leben mit einem behinderten Kind. (Zürich, Köln 1974), ISBN 3545275175 (Benziger), ISBN 3717921541 (Flamberg-Verlag), ISBN 3492106447 (Piper, reworked new edition 1984)
- mit Gerd Hansen (Hrsg.): Psychotherapie bei Menschen mit geistiger Behinderung. Bad Heilbrunn, Obb. 1991. ISBN 3781506878
- Meine Lektion der Abrahamsgeschichte. In Marianne Dirks (Hrsg.): Glauben Frauen anders? Freiburg 1983. ISBN 3451087766
- Erziehung eines behinderten Kindes. In Heidi Bohnet-von der Thüsen (Hrsg.) : Denkanstöße ʽ89. München, Zürich 1989. ISBN 3492108652
- Der Mensch mit Down-Syndrom in Familie und Gesellschaft. In Jan Murken und Elke Dietrich-Reichart (Hrsg.): Down-Syndrom. Starnberg-Percha 1990. ISBN 3796205151
- Erfahrungen einer Mutter. In: Wir haben euch etwas zu sagen, Bundesvereinigung Lebenshilfe für geistig Behinderte, Bayerisches Nationalmuseum München (Hrsg.). München 1984. Ausstellungskatalog
