= Tilman Michael =

German choral conductor

- Born: 1975 (age 49–50); Stuttgart
- Education: Musikhochschule Stuttgart; Musikhochschule Köln
- Occupation: Choral conductor
- Organizations: Nationaltheater Mannheim; Oper Frankfurt; Metropolitan Opera

Tilman Michael (born 1975) is a German choral conductor. He has been choral conductor at Oper Frankfurt since 2014. There and in his previous position at the Nationaltheater Mannheim he led the opera chorus to be voted opera chorus of the year by the critics from Opernwelt. He is appointed to lead the chorus of the Metropolitan Opera from the 2024/25 season.

== Career ==
Michael was born 1975 in Stuttgart. He was a member of the boys' choir Collegium Iuvenum there in the early 1990s. He studied at the Musikhochschule Stuttgart and the Musikhochschule Köln. Right afterwards he became second choral conductor at the Hamburg State Opera. He moved on to the Nationaltheater Mannheim where he had his first leading position, improving the quality of the group to being awarded the distinction Opera choir of the year by the critics of the trade magazine Opernwelt.

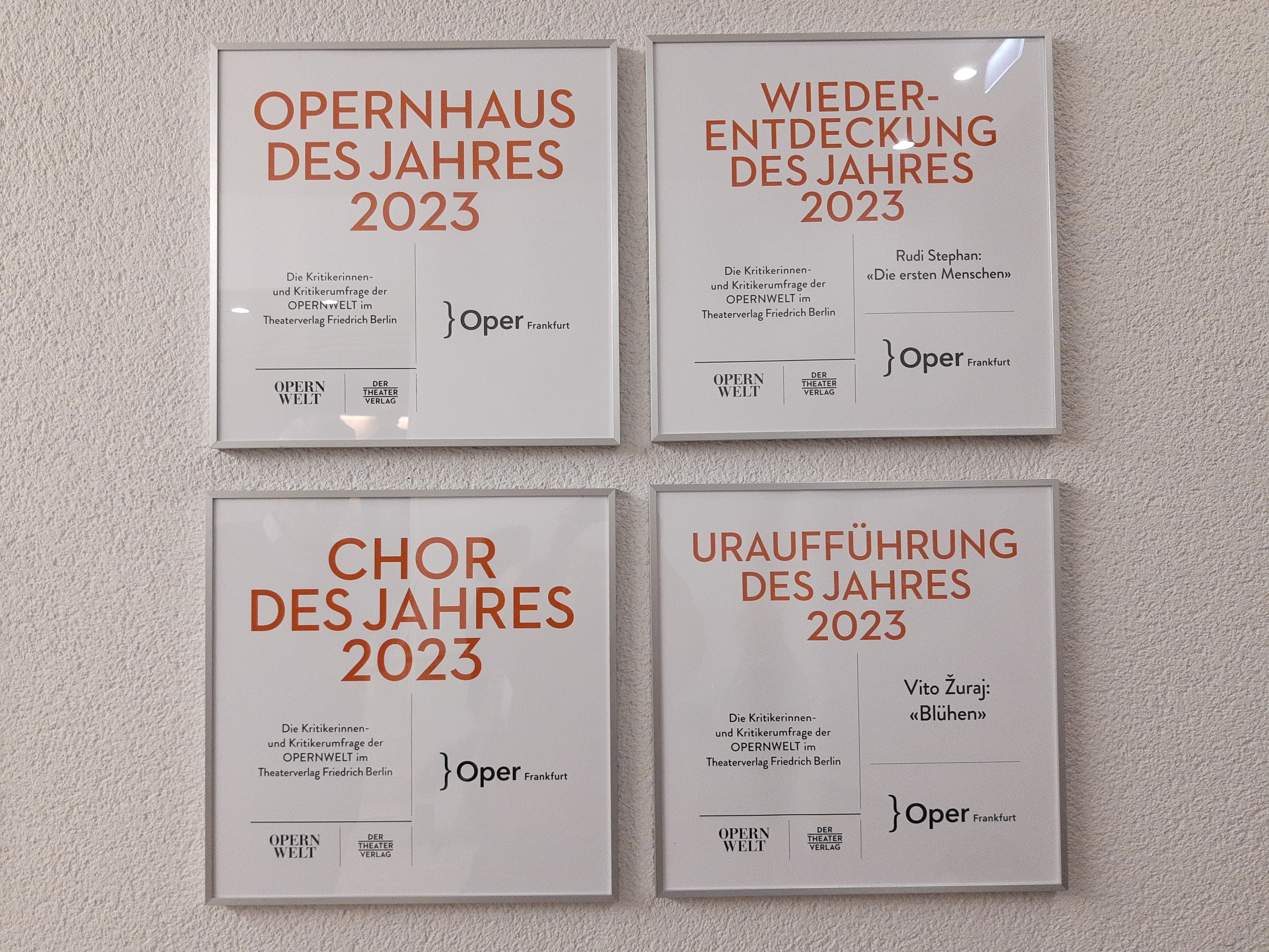
Frankfurt opera awards 2023

From 2014, Michael was choral conductor at the Oper Frankfurt, achieving the distinction Opera choir of the year several times, last in 2023, for the new productions of Wagner's Die Meistersinger von Nürnberg and Handel's Hercules.

Michael was assistant choral conductor at the Bayreuth Festival for ten years. He has prepared choirs at leading companies of the world such as Dutch National Opera in Amsterdam, Semperoper in Dresden, Staatstheater Stuttgart, in Moscow and Vienna, having rehearsed more than 150 operas. He prepared Wagner's Lohengrin at the Bavarian State Opera in Munich.

Michael also worked with the Estonian Philharmonic Chamber Choir, and with radio choirs including the BR Chor, MDR Rundfunkchor, NDR Chor, and WDR Rundfunkchor Köln. He performed with vocal ensembles in churches and leading concert halls of 25 countries, including the Elbphilharmonie, the Kölner Philharmonie and Konzerthaus Dortmund. Michael conducted world premieres of music by Adriana Hölszky, Bernhard Lang, Olga Neuwirth and Salvatore Sciarrino. He was a guest conductor at the Tiroler Festspiele Erl for Bach's Christmas Oratorio and prepared the Hong Kong Philharmonic Chorus for the Brahms Requiem.

Michael is the chorus master designate of the Metropolitan Opera (Met) from the 2024/25 season, succeeding Donald Palumbo who retired at age 75 after 17 seasons with the company. He had worked with the music director Yannick Nézet-Séguin in 2019 when he prepared the BR Chor for Shostakovich's Symphony No. 13 with the Rotterdam Philharmonic. Nézet-Séguin and Thomas Lausmann, the Met's director of music administration, approached him as a candidate in 2023. Lausmann watched a performance of Verdi's Don Carlo in Frankfurt, and Michael watched Verdi's La forza del destino and Puccini's Turandot. Michael, as other candidates, spent a day rehearsing with the Met chorus, working on Offenbach's Les Contes d'Hoffmann, Puccini's La Rondine and The Hours by Kevin Puts and Greg Pierce. In the announcement of his appointment, Nézet-Séguin described Michael, then age 49, as a "longtime collaborator and friend" and said: "He has an innate understanding of the complexity of the voice and draws out the best in the choruses he works with".

His first premiere was the opening performance of the 2024/25 season, Grounded by Jeanine Tesori. He is scheduled to prepare the chorus for Die Frau ohne Schatten and a new work by John Adams.

In 2025, Michael conducted the musical performance at the high-level plenary meeting to commemorate the eightieth anniversary of the establishment of the United Nations.
