= Luise Jaide =

German operatic mezzo-soprano (1842–1914)

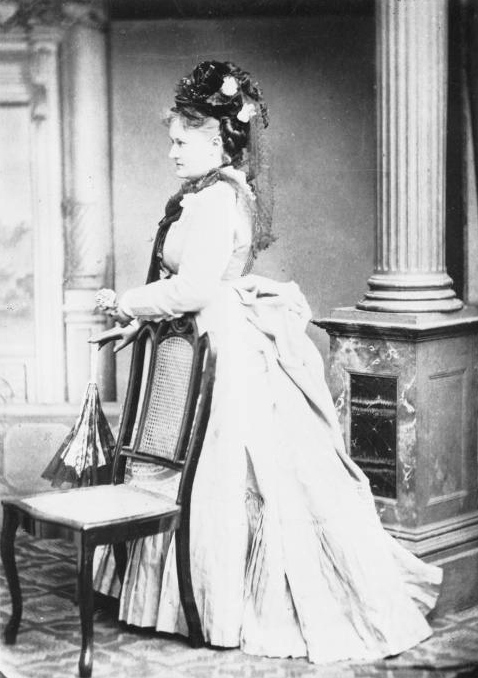
Luise Jaide in 1875

Luise Jaide (also Louise Jaide-Schlosser) (26 March 1842 – 2 January 1914) was a German operatic mezzo-soprano who had an active career during the latter half of the 19th century. Among her signature roles were Amneris in Aida, Azucena in Il trovatore, Frau Reich in The Merry Wives of Windsor, Idamante in Idomeneo, Irmentraud in Der Waffenschmied, and Mary in The Flying Dutchman. She is best remembered today for playing several roles in the first complete presentation of Richard Wagner's The Ring Cycle at the very first Bayreuth Festival in 1876.

== Biography ==
Born Luise Jaide in Darmstadt, Jaide studied at the Stuttgart Conservatory. She made her professional opera debut in 1859 as Pierotto in Gaetano Donizetti's Linda di Chamounix at the Dresden Court Theater under the name Louise Orth. Subsequent engagements took her to the Municipal Theater of Bremen and the German Opera Theater in Rotterdam. From 1861 to 1862, she was committed to the Staatsoper Hannover and she performed at the Stadttheater Regensburg from 1862 to 1865. She returned to Darmstadt in 1865, where she remained for the next twelve years, performing under the name of Louise Jaide.

In 1872, Richard Wagner heard Jaide perform in Darmstadt and was very impressed by her vocal and dramatic abilities. He invited her to take part in the first presentation of the complete Ring Cycle at the Bayreuth Festival in 1876. This was the first time that the third and fourth operas in the Ring cycle, Siegfried and Götterdämmerung, were heard. Jaide played Erda in Siegfried at its première on August 16, 1876, and she played Waltraute in Götterdämmerung at its première on August 17, 1876. She also sang the role of Waltraute in Wagner's Die Walküre as part of the first complete Ring cycle on August 14, 1876.

As a guest artist Jaide appeared at the Staatsoper Stuttgart (1873), the opera house in Wiesbaden (1874), the Vienna State Opera (1874 and 1877), and the Oper Frankfurt (1875). From 1878 to 1879, Jaide was a member of the opera house in Bremen. From 1879 to 1889, she was committed to the opera house in Rotterdam. From 1889 to 1890, she was a principal artist at the Vlaamse Opera, after which she retired from the stage. After her opera career ended, Jaide dedicated herself to teaching aspiring opera singers in Darmstadt.
