= Kathe Volkart-Schlager =

Austrian composer and musicologist

Kathe Volkart-Schlager (7 February 1897 – 1976) was an Austrian composer and music educator, and pianist.

Volkart-Schlager was born in Vienna and studied at the Stuttgart College of Music (now the State University of Music and Performing Arts Stuttgart) with Max Pauer, Wilhelm Kempff, and Joseph Hass. She graduated in 1917 and gave concerts and lectures for teachers, traveling to Sweden, Turkey, and Finland. She married architect Hans Volkart and they had at least three children, one of whom was psychotherapist and author Silvia Volkart Gorres. Volkart-Schlager taught at the State University of Music and Performing Arts Stuttgart for many years.

Volkart-Schlager's music, much of it made for piano with four hands, was published by Suddeutscher Musikverlag (now Barenreiter). The owner, Willy Muller, was considered daring for publishing Volkart-Schlager's works during the 1940s since she opposed Nazism.

== Compositions ==
=== Chamber music ===
- Cycle (cello and viola)
- Cycle (oboe and viola)
- Moravian Suite (oboe and piano)
- Seven Small Pieces (two violins and piano)
- Singing Windrose (violin and piano)
- Sonata in c minor (violin and piano)
- Sonata in d minor (oboe and piano)
- Sonata in g minor (violin and piano)
- Two Sonatinas (oboe or violin and piano or harpsichord)
- Workbook for Little Violinists
- Workbook for Young Cellists

=== Piano ===
- 20 Piano Pieces for Teachers and Students
- 26 Piano Pieces for Teachers and Students
- 30 Easy Piano Pieces for Beginners
- All Sorts for Three: Seven Small Pieces
- Colorful Circle vol 1 & 2
- Colorful Picture Book for Young Piano Players
- For Little People: 30 Easy Piano Pieces for Beginners
- Four-Handed Keyboard Crocodile: Easy Piano Pieces for Children (four hands)
- Fun Fair (12 pieces)
- Garden Party (14 pieces for four hands)
- Little World (10 pieces)
- Mohrentanz and Mummenschanz (four hands)
- More Joy in Twos: 20 Pieces for Teachers and Students (four hands)
- Old Dances
- Playground (four hands)
- Sleeping Beauty (four hands)
- Tone Circles (four hands)
- We Make Music on Two Pianos (J. S. Bach and G. F. Handel arranged by Volkart-Schlager for two pianos)
- Shoemaker (four hands)

=== Vocal music ===
- "Assistono Diversi Santi" (Several Saints Attend)
- "Das Geheimnis" (The Secret) (text by Max Geissler)
- "Die Ferne Flote" (The Distant Flute)
- "Föhn" (text by Dora Stieler)
- "Gib acht!" (Beware!) (text by Max Geissler)
- "Kirschblute" (Cherry Blossom)
- "Schenke im Fruhling" (Give in Spring)
- "Vor dem Schlafengehen" (Before Bedtime) (text by Hermann Hesse)
- "Wie sind die Tage schwer" (How are the days difficult?) (text by Hermann Hesse)
