= Harold Morris (composer) =

American pianist, composer and educator

Harold Cecil Morris (March 17, 1890 – May 6, 1964) was an American pianist, composer and educator.

Morris was born in San Antonio, Texas. He graduated from the University of Texas in 1910 and received his master's degree from the Cincinnati Conservatory of Music in 1922. He married Cosby Dansby, August 20, 1914; the couple had one daughter. Morris moved from his native San Antonio, Texas to New York in 1916.

== Performances and compositions ==
Morris toured extensively as a recitalist and soloist and his compositions were performed frequently during his lifetime. He made his New York concert debut in recital in January 1921 at Aeolian Hall, with a program of Brahms, Busoni, Chopin, Godowsky, Cyril Scott and Charles Tomlinson Griffes. On November 21, 1931, Morris was the piano soloist for a performance of his Piano Concerto with the Boston Symphony Orchestra at Carnegie Hall. Morris' composition, Poem was performed by violinist and conductor Eugène Ysaÿe in Cincinnati, Ohio with the Cincinnati Orchestra on November 29, 1918. Violinist Josef Stransky performed the work at Carnegie Hall with the Philadelphia Orchestra three months later.

Morris' Violin Concerto received its world premiere on May 25, 1939, performed by violinist Philip Frank and the NBC Symphony Orchestra under the direction of Frank Black. The broadcast was the prize in a composition contest by the National Federation of Music Clubs. The award was shared by composer Arthur Farwell whose work was performed in a separate broadcast. The Violin Concerto had its New York concert debut on December 20, 1941, by the National Orchestral Association and violin soloist Caroll Glenn.

The Composers' Forum Laboratory, part of the Federal Music Project of the Works Progress Administration Music Project, presented a concert of Morris' works at Midtown Community Music Center in New York City in 1935. The Modern Art Quartet performed Morris' "String Quartet." Morris' sonata for piano and violin and the second and third movements from his concerto for piano and orchestra were also performed. Five months later, in February 1936, Morris' music shared the bill with works by Henry Cowell, Charles Haubiel, Marion Bauer, and Frederick Jacobi at a Composers' Forum Laboratory concert at New York's Federal Music Building.

Morris' sonata for piano, violin and cello won the publication award from the Society for the Publication of American Music in 1951.

== Teaching career ==
Morris taught at the Juilliard School of Music from 1922 to 1939, at Columbia University from 1939 to 1946, and at The Castle School in Tarrytown, New York. He also maintained a teaching studio in Manhattan, at Rice Institute (1933), Duke University (1939–40), and the University of Texas. He died in New York City.

== Leadership and Affiliations ==
Morris was one of the principal founders of the American Music Guild in New York in 1921. He served as United States director of the International Society for Contemporary Music from 1936 to 1940. From 1937 to 1963, Morris held positions of vice president and chairman of Program Committee of the National Association of American Composers and Conductors.

== Selected Compositions ==
=== For Orchestra ===
- Poem, after Tagore's Gitanjali (1918)
- Dum-a-Lum, variations on a Negro spiritual (1925)
- Piano Concerto on Two Negro Themes (1931)
- Symphony No. 1, after Browning's Prospice (1934)
- Violin Concerto (1939)
- Passacaglia and Fugue (1939)
- Suite (1941)
- American Epic (1942)
- Heroic Overture (1943)
- Symphony No. 2, "Victory" (1943)
- Symphony No. 3, "Amaranth" (1948)

=== Chamber music ===
- Piano Sonata in B-flat minor, Op. 2
- Opus No. 3 (1915) (solo piano)
- Violin Sonata
- Prologue and Scherzo (flute, violin, cello and piano)
- Rhapsody (flute, cello, and piano)
