= Franz Stockhausen =

German conductor

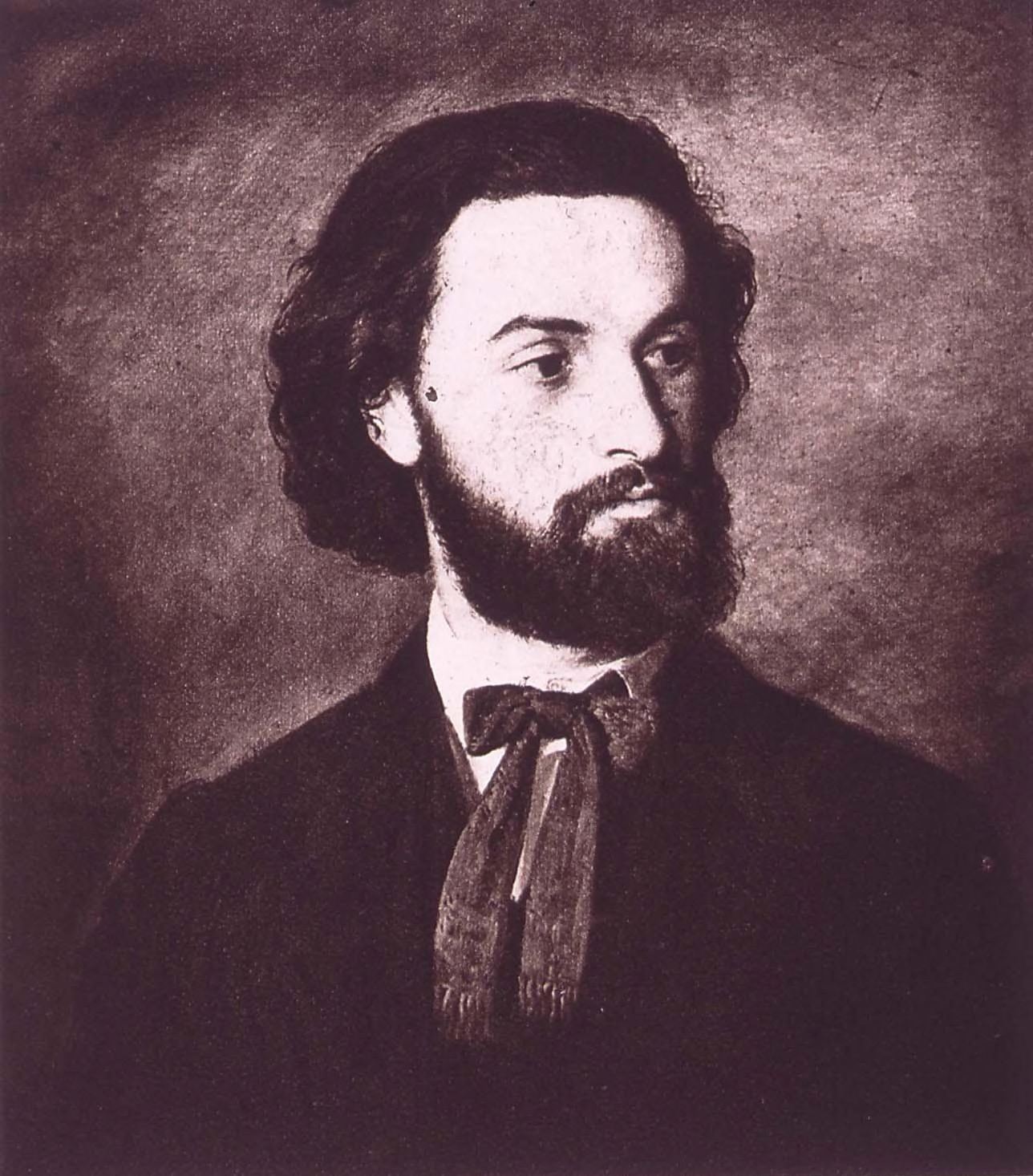
Stockhause in 1862

Franz Stockhausen (January 30, 1839 – January 4, 1926) was a German choral conductor, and a member of a celebrated German musical family.

== Early life ==
Franz was born in Guebwiller, the brother of the singer and pedagogue Julius Stockhausen, and son of the harp virtuoso Franz Stockhausen Sr. and his wife, the soprano Margarethe. From 1860 to 1862 he studied at the Leipzig Conservatory under Ignaz Moscheles, Ernst Richter and Moritz Hauptmann.

== Career ==
From 1863 to 1866 he was chief conductor at Thann, in Alsace, and from 1866 to 1868 he was with his brother at Hamburg, who was then conducting the Philharmonic Concerts and the Singakademie. In 1868 he became the conductor of the Société de Chant Sacré, and of Strasbourg Cathedral. In 1871 he directed the concerts of the Town and Conservatory of Strasbourg. He gave up the direction of the Church choral society in 1879. He became a Royal professor in 1892, and in 1907 he retired from public life.

== Sources ==
- Arthur Eaglefield Hull, Dictionary of Modern Music and Musicians (J. M. Dent, London 1924).
