= Clara Baur =

German-born music teacher and founder

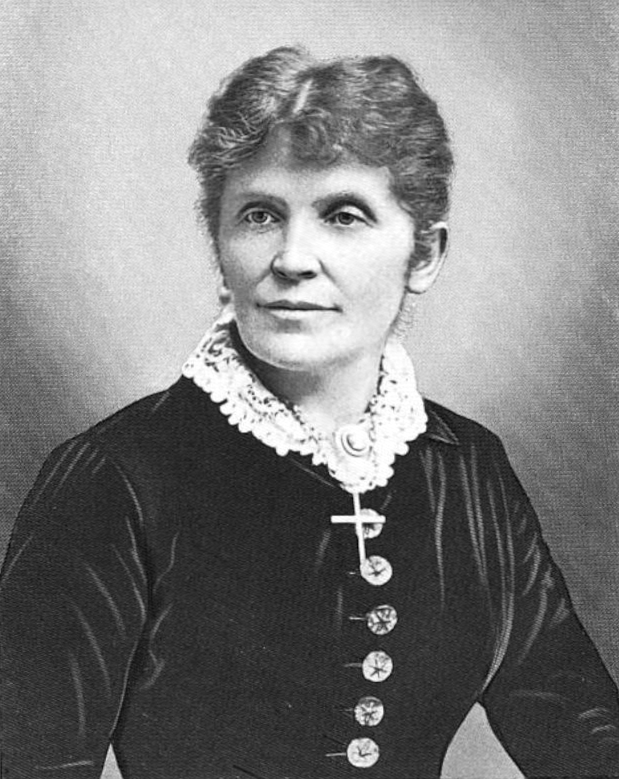
- Born: 10 December 1835; Baden-Württemberg, Germany
- Died: 18 December 1912 (aged 77); Cincinnati, Ohio, United States
- Occupation: Music teacher
- Known for: Founding the Cincinnati Conservatory of Music

Clara Baur (1835–1912) was a German-born music teacher and founder of the Cincinnati Conservatory of Music.

== Biography ==
Clara Baur was born in Baden-Württemberg, Germany, on 10 December 1835. Her father was a Lutheran preacher. Her elder brother Theodore moved to Cincinnati and after a few years he was joined by his brother Emil. Her niece Wanda married Chalmers Clifton. Baur went out to act as their housekeeper and also offered piano and voice lessons from the house. In 1867, she visited Stuttgart to see how their music education was structured. Baur intended to set up a school based on the European methods. She also visited Paris and studied there before she returned and opened her Conservatory of Music at the end of the year in a room rented from the School of Young Ladies run by Clara Nourse. She had four tutors including her own voice coach, a cellist and a pianist. Baur would arrange accommodation for students from outside of the city. By the second year, the school expanded to include the violin, flute and theoretical instruction. One of Baur's students was soprano Emma Heckle.

The conservatory continued to grow and when Baur died in 1912, her niece Bertha Baur took over. The school merged to become the Cincinnati College—Conservatory of Music in 1955, and it became part of the University of Cincinnati in 1962.

Baur died from heart failure at her apartments in the Conservatory on 18 December 1912.
