= Immanuel Faisst =

German composer (1823–1894)

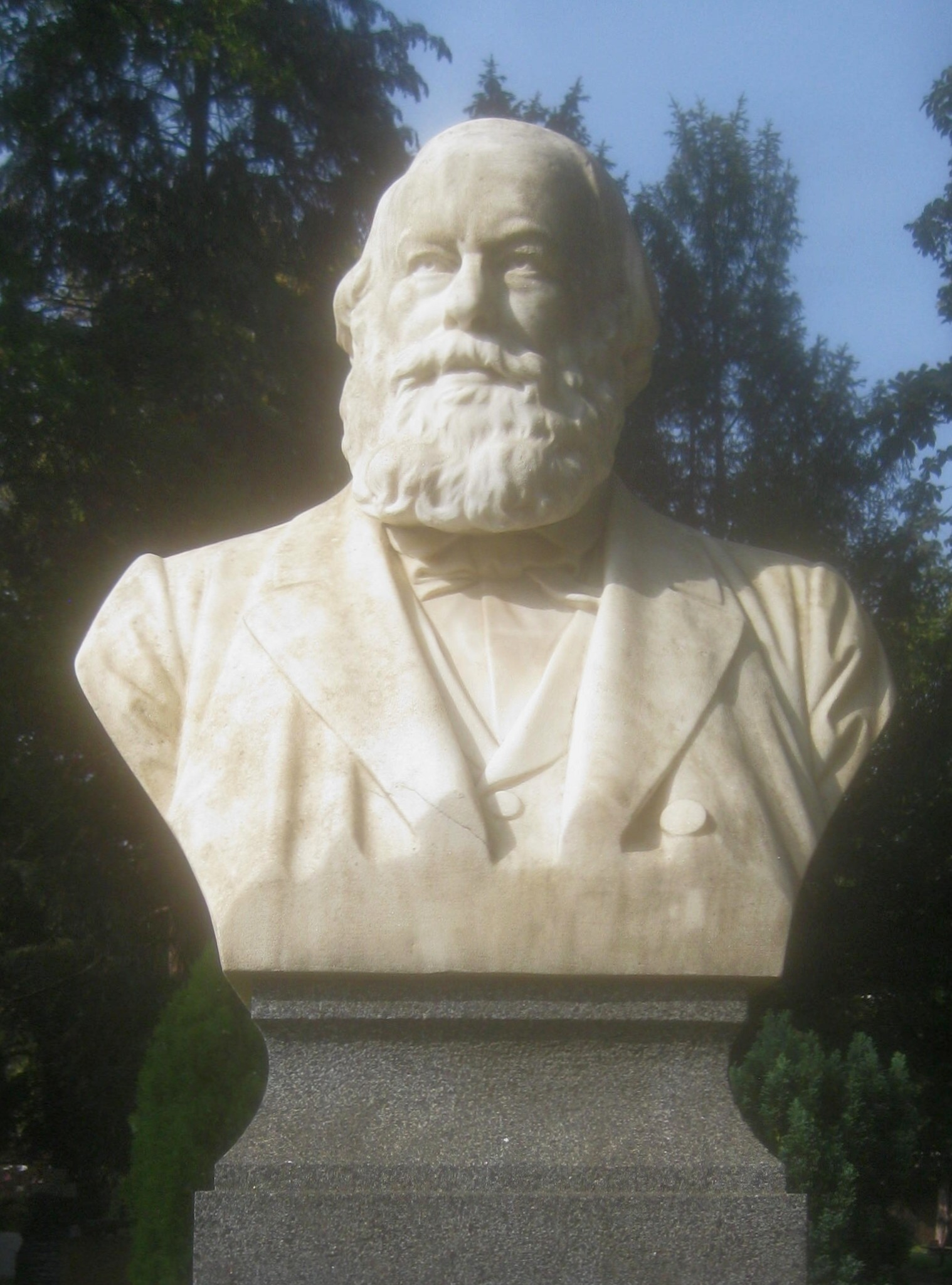
Immanuel Faisst.

Immanuel Gottlob Friedrich Faisst (13 October 1823 in Esslingen am Neckar – 5 June 1894 in Stuttgart) was a German composer and co-founder of the Stuttgart Music School, whose director he was, until his death. His compositions include works for organ, and some exercises on double fugue for piano, lieders, choruses, motets, cantatas, etc. Finally, along with Sigmund Lebert and Hans von Bülow, he published in 1881 the famous Cotta edition of the Beethoven Sonatas.

== Life ==
He was sent to the seminary at Schönthal in 1836, and in 1840 to Tübingen, in order to study theology; but bis musical talents, which had previously shown themselves in the direction of great proficiency on the organ, were too strong, and, although he received no direct musical instruction worth mentioning, he had made such progress in composition by 1844 that when he went to Berlin and showed his productions to Mendelssohn, that master advised him to work by himself rather than attach himself to any teacher.

In 1846 he appeared in public as an organ player in many German towns, and finally took up his abode in Stuttgart. Here in 1847 he founded an organ school and a society for the study of church music. He undertook the direction of several choral societies, and in 1857 took a prominent part in the foundation of the Conservatorium, to the management of which he was appointed two years later. Some time before this the University of Tübingen bestowed upon him the degree of Doctor of Philosophy, in recognition of the value of his 'Beträge zum Geschichte der Claviersonate,' an important contribution to the musical periodical Cäcilia (1846), and the title of Professor was given him a few years afterwards. In 1865 he was appointed organist of the Stiftskirche, and received a prize for his choral work 'Gesang im Grünen' at the choral festival in Dresden. His setting of Schiller's 'Macht des Gesanges' was equally successful in the following year with the Schlesische Sängerbund, and a cantata 'Des Sängers Wiederkehr' has been frequently performed. His compositions are almost entirely confined to church music and choral compositions. Several quartets for male voices, and organ pieces were published collectively, and the Lebert and Stark 'Pianoforteschule' contains a double fugue by him. With the latter he published in 1880 an 'Elementar- und Chorgesangschule,' which has considerable value. He undertook the editing of the great edition of Beethoven's pianoforte sonatas with Lebert, for the firm of Cotta, for which edition Von Bülow edited the sonatas from op. 53 onwards. Faisst died at Stuttgart, June 5, 1894.
