= State University of Music and Performing Arts Stuttgart =

German music school in Stuttgart

Coordinates: 48°46′48″N 9°11′19″E

Staatliche Hochschule für Musik und Darstellende Kunst Stuttgart
- Staatliche Hochschule für Musik und Darstellende Kunst Stuttgart
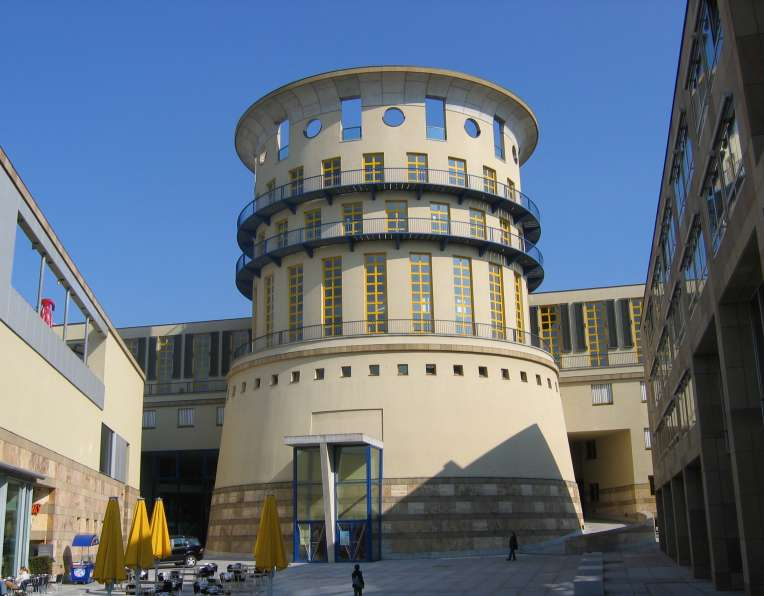
- Main entrance, building by James Stirling
- Established: 1857
- Students: c. 770
- Location: Stuttgart, Baden-Württemberg, Germany
- Mascot: ate
- Website: www.mh-stuttgart.de

The State University of Music and Performing Arts Stuttgart is a professional school for musicians and performing artists in Stuttgart, Germany. Founded in 1857, it is one of the oldest schools of its kind in Germany. It offers programs in music, performing arts, and related disciplines. The university is structured into four faculties and eleven institutes, covering areas such as composition, music education, instrumental and vocal studies, conducting, acting, and puppetry. Its main building, located on the Stuttgart Kulturmeile, was completed in 2002. As of 2023, the university enrolled approximately 800 students and employed over 500 academic and administrative staff. Admission is based on an entrance examination.

== History ==
The school was founded in 1857 as "Stuttgarter Musikschule" (Stuttgart music school) by Sigmund Lebert, Immanuel Faisst, Wilhelm Speidel and Ludwig Stark. It was named a conservatory in 1865. From 1869 it was named "Königliches Konservatorium für Musik" (Royal conservatory of music) of the Kingdom of Württemberg, and from 1921 "Württembergische Hochschule für Musik" (Württemberg university of music).

== Study ==
The academic structure at the State University of Music and Performing Arts Stuttgart follows a three-cycle system aligned with the Bologna Process:

=== First Cycle – Undergraduate (Bachelor) ===
Bachelor's programs typically span eight semesters. Fields of study include instrumental and vocal performance, composition, conducting, music theory, church music (category B), jazz/pop, music education, acting, speech training, and puppetry. Admission requires a university entrance qualification and the successful completion of an entrance examination.

=== Second Cycle – Graduate (Master) ===
Master's programs generally require four semesters and offer advanced study in the same fields as the bachelor's level. Examples include music performance, music pedagogy, composition, church music (category A), and media-related speech disciplines. Admission is based on a relevant undergraduate degree and subject-specific entrance evaluation.

=== Third Cycle – Postgraduate and Doctoral ===
The university offers postgraduate artistic qualifications such as the Konzertexamen (concert diploma) and Bühnendiplom (stage diploma). Doctoral studies (Dr. phil.) are available in disciplines including musicology, music education, and related areas. Doctoral candidates must meet university and faculty-specific admission requirements.

=== Institutional Collaborations ===
Selected programs incorporate institutional cooperation. These include joint practical training modules with the Stuttgart State Opera, SWR Symphony Orchestra Stuttgart, and regional theatre institutions. These collaborations are integrated into the study structure but do not lead to separate degrees.

== Notable teachers and students ==
- Iveta Apkalna
- Nicola Bulfone
- Adelaide Casely-Hayford
- Cecil Coles
- Johann Nepomuk David
- Jörg Demus
- Melanie Diener (born 1967), soprano
- Árpád Doppler (1884–1927)
- Gerhard Oppitz (born 1953), pianist
- Jörg Faerber (1929–2022), conductor
- Sylvia Geszty (1934–2018), soprano
- Hermine May (born 1973), soprano
- Matthias Klink (born 1969), tenor
- Karl Ludwig Gerok (1906–1975), organist
- Percy Goetschius (1873)
- Harry Plunket Greene
- Hans Grischkat (1903–1977), church musician, professor
- Natalia Gutman, cellist
- Joseph Haas (born 1916)
- Eugen Haile (1873–1933), composer
- Luise Jaide
- Udo Kasemets
- Maria Kalesnikava, Music teacher, political activist
- Erhard Karkoschka
- Gustav Kastropp
- Edgar Stillman Kelley (1880)
- Matthias Manasi
- Eun Sun Kim
- Richard Rudolf Klein (1921–2011)
- Samuel Kummer, organist
- Helmut Lachenmann
- Nathan Laube
- Kolja Lessing (born 1961)
- Karl Marx
- Barry McDaniel (1930–2018)
- Elke Neidhardt (1941–2013)
- Tilman Michael opera chorus master
- Lauren Newton (1974)
- Anja Petersen
- Marlis Petersen
- Felix Petyrek
- Dionys Pruckner
- Olga Radecki
- Sigurd Rascher
- Hermann Reutter
- Harald Schmidt
- Benyamin Sönmez
- Ewandro Stenzowski (born 1984)
- Marco Stroppa
- Hermann Suter
- Ernest Torrence
- Kathe Volkart-Schlager
- Michael Volle (born 1960)
- Karl Wendling (born 1929)
- Florian Wiek (born 1972)
- Yehuda Yannay
- Karl Maria Zwißler
- Victor Herbert (1859-1924), operetta composer

== Library ==
The university library currently consists of 18,000 books, 80,000 scores and 9,000 recordings.
