= Manhattan Beach =

Manhattan Beach may refer to:

== Places ==
In the United States:

- Manhattan Beach, California
- Manhattan Beach (Denver), Colorado, first amusement park built west of the Mississippi River (1881) that burnt down in 1908 and was rebuilt as Luna Park
- Manhattan Beach (Florida), now part of Hanna Park, an historically African-American beach during the 20th century near Jacksonville Beach
- Manhattan Beach, Minnesota
- Manhattan Beach, Brooklyn, New York

== Arts, entertainment, and media ==
- "Manhattan Beach" (march), by John Philip Sousa
- Manhattan Beach (novel), a 2017 novel by Jennifer Egan
