= Margarethe Stockhausen =

French opera singer

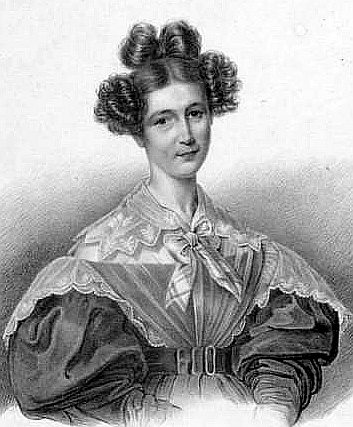
Margarethe Stockhausen

Margarethe Stockhausen (29 March 1803 – 1877), born Margarethe Schmuck, was a soprano who had a distinguished career in Europe and Britain during the 1820s and 1830s. She was wife of the harpist Franz Anton Adam Stockhausen, and mother of the eminent musicians Julius, Franz and Henri Stockhausen.

Margarethe Schmuck was born in Guebwiller, Alsace, the daughter of a notary. She studied singing in Paris under Giuseppe Catrufo. Her niece Josephine Bildstein also had a singing career. While in Paris Margarethe met the young harpist Franz Stockhausen (b. 1789), who was then living by teaching and performing. Franz was a friend of Sébastien Érard and a correspondent of Beethoven's, in the circle of François-Antoine Habeneck, and shared lodgings with the violinist Christian Urhan. She married Franz in Paris in 1822 and they began a family, and they also began giving concerts together, often with Franz accompanying her on the harp. At first she became well known for her recitals of songs of Alsace, which were warmly received in Paris, and she was noted for the beauty and pearl-like quality of her voice and its spiritual conviction. She was a devout Roman Catholic.

After a year in Alsace in 1825, she returned to Paris where her son, the famous singer Julius Stockhausen, was born in 1826. In January 1827 she was named an Honorary Singer of the (French) King's Chapel, through Rochefoucauld influence. However it soon became necessary for the family to look elsewhere for an income, so they moved to London, and in May 1827 gave their first concert at the Royal Academy of Music in a recital at which Giuditta Pasta also sang. After this they received many bookings for soirees and private parties. They befriended Ignaz Moscheles there. The Swiss songs made her the darling of English audiences. During the second year in London she sang a good deal in oratorio, especially in the works of Handel, in which she was strongly encouraged by Sir George Smart.

In January 1829 Margarethe toured in Scotland with Angelica Catalani. At this time her repertoire extended to works of Handel, Haydn, Beethoven, Mozart, Spohr, Carl Maria von Weber, Mendelssohn, Cherubini, Sapienza, Cimarosa, Fioravanti, Mercadante, Rossini and Meyerbeer. In the summer she sang in Manchester and Oxford before returning to Alsace. She came back to sing in concerts of the Philharmonic Society in London in January 1830, and over the next decade spent a great deal of time in Britain, including entire seasons in 1830, 1831, 1834 and 1835. During this time she was also having further children and, in the meantime, singing in tours of Switzerland, Alsace, the Rhineland, South Germany, and France. In October 1830 she toured the English Midlands with Maria Malibran and the violinist Charles de Bériot, refusing to join her husband in an early journey by train, between Manchester and Liverpool, but following in the post carriage. At Manchester she was singing duets with Malibran.

In 1831, during a further tour in Scotland, she sang at Holyrood House for the Queen of the United Kingdom, and before the Duke of Devonshire and the Duke of Wellington. In that year the family acquired its own permanent home at Tannenfels (Baden-Württemberg), and Margerethe's parents oversaw the upbringing of her children, who attended school at Guebwiller. In 1833 Franz and Margerethe made their first German concert tour, visiting Darmstadt, Karlsruhe, Cologne and Frankfurt am Main.

Margerethe's career continued in a similar vein until 1840. In January 1839 she made a major tour of Switzerland, visiting Genf, Lausanne, Neuchâtel, Bern, and Solothurn. After the birth of her son Henri she made her last British tour, first giving concerts in Paris and then in April moving on to London for the start of a punishing schedule. Having seen Pauline Garcia as Desdemona in Rossini's Otello, in London, she went to Glasgow and Edinburgh, and travelled across England in all directions by rail to give concerts, except where cities such as Nottingham and Lincoln still demanded coach travel. In September 1839 she sang under Spohr's direction in his oratorio Calvary at the Norwich Festival, afterwards travelling back to London with him in the same carriage. She died at Colmar.

== Sources ==
J. Wirth, Julius Stockhausen - Der Sänger des Deutschen Liedes (Englert und Schlosser, Frankfurt am Main 1927), 1-46.
