= Cincinnati Conservatory of Music =

Former music conservatory in Cincinnati, Ohio, U.S.

- On the lawn of The Cincinnati Conservatory of Music 1913
- Type: Conservatory
- Active: 1867–1955
- Founder: Clara Baur
- Location: 301 Oak Street, Cincinnati, Ohio, United States
- Successor: Cincinnati College-Conservatory of Music

The Cincinnati Conservatory of Music was a conservatory, associated with a girls' finishing school, founded in 1867 in Cincinnati, Ohio. It merged with the College of Music of Cincinnati in 1955, forming the Cincinnati College-Conservatory of Music, which is now part of the University of Cincinnati.

Noted alumni include cancer researcher Aldred Scott Warthin, singer and entertainer Tennessee Ernie Ford, trumpeter Al Hirt, jazz pianist Pat Moran McCoy, and composers Harold Morris, Conlon Nancarrow, and Margaret McClure Stitt.

== History ==
The Cincinnati Conservatory of Music was founded by Clara Baur in 1867. It was the first music school in Cincinnati and was a conservatory, associated with a girls' finishing school. On June 10, 1924, Burnet Corwin Tuthill, general manager of the conservatory, instigated a meeting for the formation of the National Association of Schools of Music together with five other institutions: the American Conservatory of Music, the Bush Conservatory of Music, the Louisville Conservatory of Music, the Pittsburgh Musical Institute, and the Walcott Conservatory of Music.

It merged with the College of Music of Cincinnati in 1955, forming the Cincinnati College-Conservatory of Music, which is now part of the University of Cincinnati.

== Student activities ==
The conservatory had a chapter of Sigma Iota Chi literary sorority from 1905 to 1915.

== Notable people ==
=== Alumni ===
- Lou Busch, record producer, musician and songwriter
- Tennessee Ernie Ford (1939), singer and television personality
- Corinne Stocker Horton, elocutionist, journalist, and newspaper editor
- Pat Moran McCoy, jazz pianist
- Harold Morris, pianist, composer, and educator
- Conlon Nancarrow, composer
- Carrie Obendorfer Simon, communal leader
- Margaret McClure Stitt, dramatist
- Florence Harding, First Lady of the United States

==== Faculty ====
- Emma Heckle, professor of voice (also alumni), and for part of the time co-director of the conservatory
- James G. Heller, professor of musicology
