= Singakademie =

Type of choral society

A Singakademie – originally a phenomenon of the German-speaking realm – is a large mixed choral society, whose primary aims are to study large, significant choral works - mostly those of acknowledged masters; to train themselves with these works; and to cultivate social interaction to a high degree. Public performance of concerts is secondary.

== See also ==
- Lesson
- Music education
