= George Henschel =

British baritone and conductor

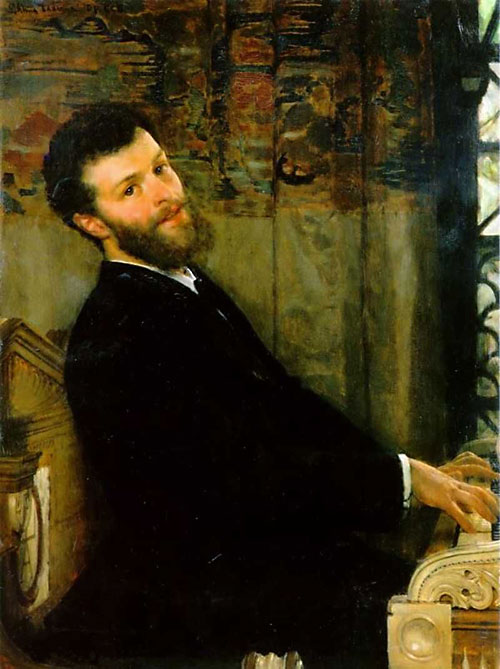
- Portrait by Lawrence Alma-Tadema, 1879
- Born: 18 February 1850; Breslau, Silesia, Kingdom of Prussia
- Died: 10 September 1934 (aged 84); Aviemore, Scotland
- Occupations: Pianist; baritone; conductor; composer; academic teacher
- Organisations: Boston Symphony Orchestra; Royal Scottish National Orchestra; Institute of Musical Art

Sir Isidor George Henschel (18 February 1850 – 10 September 1934) was a German-born British baritone, pianist, conductor, composer and academic teacher. First trained as a pianist, he was a concert singer who sometimes sang to his own accompaniment. He was a close friend of Johannes Brahms. His first wife Lillian was also a singer. He was the first conductor of both the Boston Symphony Orchestra and the Royal Scottish National Orchestra. He taught at the Institute of Musical Art in New York City.

== Biography ==
Georg Isidor Henschel was born at Breslau (now Wrocław, Poland) and educated as a pianist, making his first public appearance in Berlin in 1862. He subsequently took up singing, initially and briefly as a bass but developing a fine baritone voice. In 1868, he sang the role of Hans Sachs in a concert performance of Wagner's Die Meistersinger von Nürnberg at Munich. With one minor and unplanned exception, he never sang on stage, confining himself to concert appearances.

Henschel was a close friend of Johannes Brahms, whom he met in May 1874 at the Lower Rhenish Music Festival in Cologne, where Henschel sang the role of Harapha in Handel's oratorio Samson. The friendship lasted until Brahms's death on 3 April 1897; Henschel reports in his memoirs that he arrived in Vienna only hours too late to see Brahms before his passing, and that their last meeting had been at a restaurant in Leipzig in 1896, where they were joined by Edvard Grieg and Arthur Nikisch.

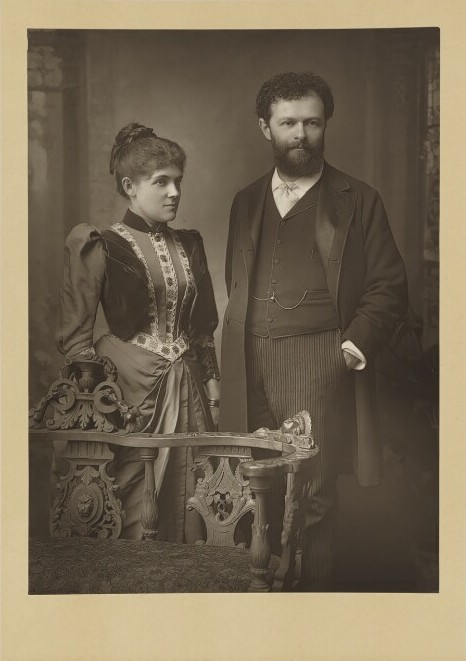
Photograph of Henschel with his wife Lillian (1891)

In 1877, Henschel began a successful career in England, singing at the principal concerts. In 1881, he married the American soprano, Lilian June Bailey (1860–1901), who was associated with him in a number of vocal recitals throughout the United States and nearly all Europe until 1884. Henschel's very highly developed sense of interpretation and style made him an ideal concert singer, while he was no less distinguished as accompanist. In fact he sometimes combined both functions; he made records as late as 1928 for the Columbia Graphophone Company, singing Lieder by Schubert and Schumann to his own accompaniment.

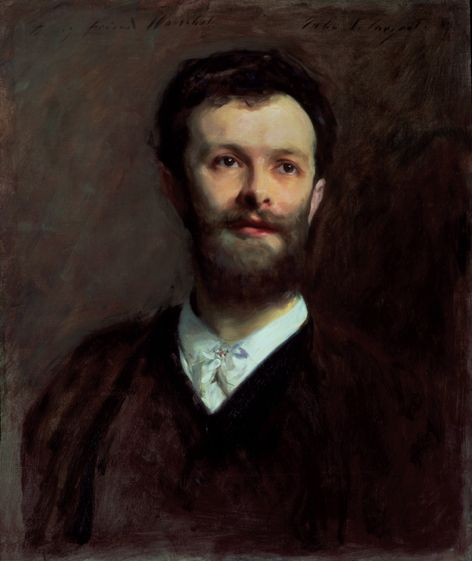
George Henschel, by John Singer Sargent, 1889

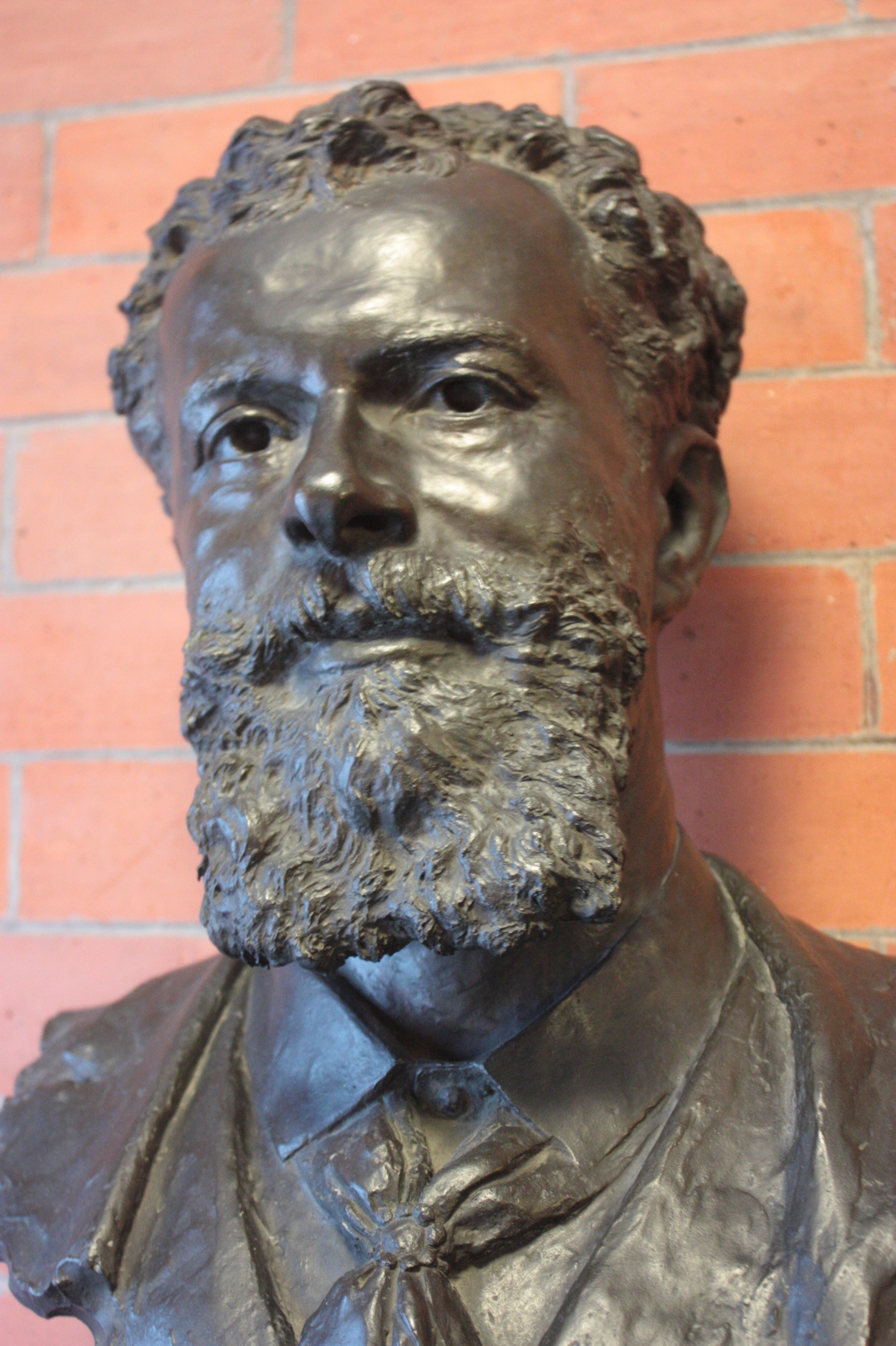
George Henschel, by Edward Onslow Ford 1895

Henschel was also a prominent conductor, in America and England. He became the first conductor of the Boston Symphony Orchestra in 1881, using the name Georg Henschel. On his appointment, he sent his ideas for an innovative seating chart to Brahms, who replied and commented in an approving letter of mid-November 1881. In 1886, he started a series known as the London Symphony Concerts, and in 1893 became the first conductor of the Royal Scottish National Orchestra.

He was knighted in 1914 and at a farewell concert that year, was presented with a lute engraved with "A token of gratitude for forty years' song". He taught at the Institute of Musical Art in New York, where he met his second wife, Amy Louis, one of his students. He also taught sopranos Lucia Dunham and Vera Curtis; bass and composer Edward M. Zimmerman; and while in England, Mary Augusta Wakefield.

== Compositions and writings ==
Henschel's compositions include songs, instrumental works, a Stabat Mater (Birmingham Festival, 1894), an opera, Nubia (Dresden, 1899), and a Requiem (Boston, 1903). In 1907 he published a collection of his journals and correspondence in Personal Recollections of Johannes Brahms and in 1918 Musings and Memories of a Musician. A Mass in eight parts a cappella was first sung in 1916.

== Personal life ==
Henschel's daughter, Georgina "Georgie" Henschel, was a noted breeder of Highland ponies and Norwegian Fjord ponies, and author of several equestrian books.

Henschel died in Aviemore, Scotland, where he maintained his holiday-home Alltnacriche with his wife. He is buried in the churchyard overlooking Loch Alvie, nearby. In 1944 his daughter Helen Henschel, herself a singer, published a biography of her parents entitled When Soft Voices Die: A Musical Biography.

== Sources ==
- Dictionary of National Biography
