= Julius Stockhausen =

German singer and music educator

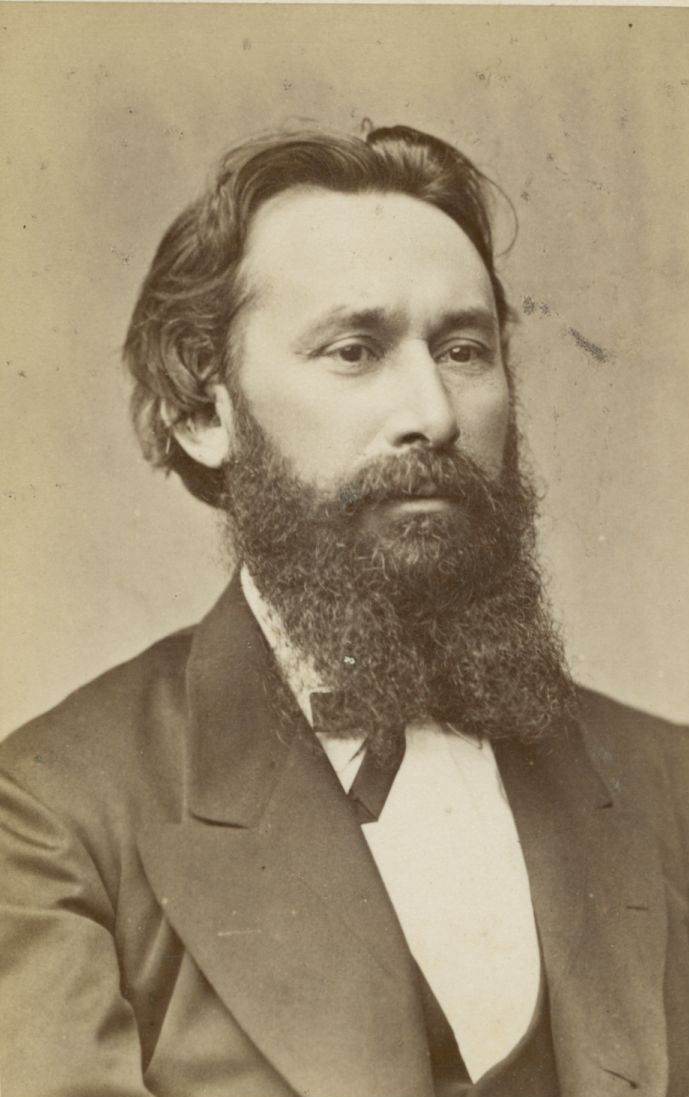

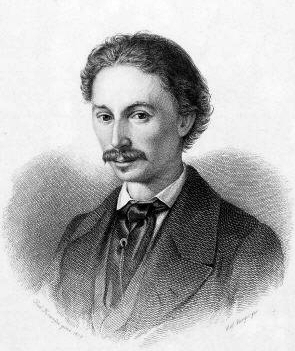
Julius Stockhausen

Julius Christian Stockhausen (22 July 1826 in Paris – 22 September 1906 in Frankfurt) was a German singer and singer master.

== Life ==
Stockhausen's parents, Franz Stockhausen Sr. (1792–1868), harpist and composer, and Margarethe Stockhausen née Schmuck, soprano, were musicians of some ability who recognized his talent and encouraged his development.

Before he had reached his 20th year he was an excellent performer on the piano, organ, violin, and cello. In 1845 he entered the Conservatoire de Paris, where he studied piano with Charles Hallé and Camille-Marie Stamaty and singing with Manuel García. In 1849 he continued his studies with Garcia in London. He quickly won fame as a remarkable concert singer (baritone). From 1862 to 1869 he resided in Hamburg as conductor of the Philharmonic Society and Singakademie.

He spent the next five years in Stuttgart as Kammersänger to the King of Württemberg, then he became conductor of Stern's Gesangverein at Berlin, where he remained until 1878, being then called to Hoch Conservatory at Frankfurt as professor of singing. Differences with Joachim Raff, the director, led to his resignation the following year and the establishment of his own school, which immediately became world famous.

After Raff's death (1882), Stockhausen returned to the conservatory, but continued his own school. Students of Stockhausen included Emma Heckle, Clarence Whitehill, Karl Perron, Anton Sistermans, Max Friedlaender, Jenny Hahn, Johan Messchaert (also: Johannes Martinus Messchaert), Hermine Spies, Rose Schottenfels, Horatio Connell and Hugo Goldschmidt. He wrote an excellent Gesangsmethode ("Singing Method") in 1884, which was translated into English by his pupil Sophie Löwe. His brother Franz Stockhausen Jr. was an eminent choral conductor who studied with Ignaz Moscheles. His daughter, Julia Wirth, née Stockhausen (1886–1964), married Joseph, son of the famous German violinist Emanuel Wirth. She was the author of Stockhausen's biography.

== Works ==
- Julius Stockhausens Gesangsmethode. Leipzig: C. F. Peters, 1884.
- Stockhausen, Julius. A Method of Singing. Translation: Sophie Löwe. London: Novello, Ewer and Co., 1884.
- Julius Stockhausens Gesangstechnik und Stimmbildung. Frankfurt am Main: C. F. Peters, 1886/87.

== Literature ==
- Wirth, Julia. Julius Stockhausen: Der Sänger des Deutschen Liedes. Frankfurt am Main: Englert/Schlosser, 1927.
- Stiftung Dr. Hoch's Konservatorium Joseph Hoch zum 100. Todestag, Frankfurt am Main: Kramer, 1974.
- Cahn, Peter. Das Hoch'sche Konservatorium in Frankfurt am Main (1878–1978), Frankfurt am Main: Kramer, 1979.
