= Ludwig Stark =

Ludwig Stark (19 June 1831 – 22 March 1884) was a German pianist, composer, teacher and musicologist.

Stark was born in Munich. He studied philosophy and music at the Ludwig-Maximilians-Universität München and, at the age of twenty-six, co-founded the Conservatory of Stuttgart. There, he also served as a teacher of harmony, singing, and music history. In 1858, he collaborated with Sigmund Lebert to publish the Grosse theoretisch-praktische Klavierschule, a piano method that was translated into several languages and widely distributed in both Europe and America. His students included Olga Radecki.

Stark died in Stuttgart at the age of 52.

== List of piano transcriptions ==
=== Bach's work ===
- Prelude & Fugue in G minor, BWV 535
- Toccata in D minor ("Dorian"), BWV 538
- Toccata in F major, BWV 540
