= Dionys Pruckner =

German pianist and music teacher (1834–1896)

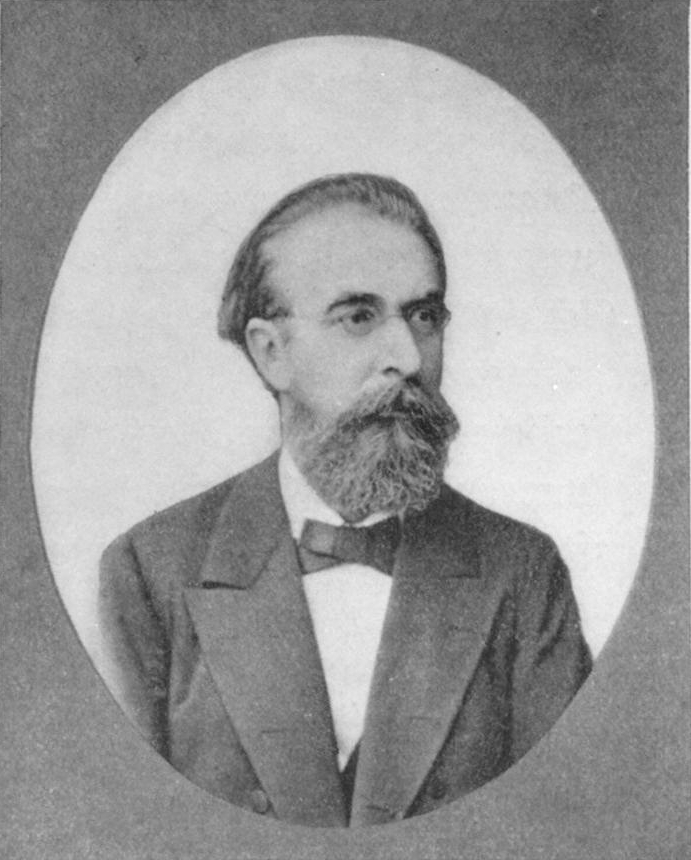
Portrait of Dionys Pruckner.

Dionys Pruckner (12 May 1834 München – 1 December 1896 Heidelberg) was a pianist and music teacher at Stuttgart. He was a student of Franz Liszt from 1852 until about 1855 who did concert tours throughout Europe. In 1859 he was appointed to the faculty of the Stuttgart Conservatory. Pruckner was a member of the masonic lodge Wilhelm zur aufgehenden Sonne in Stuttgart. His students included Olga Radecki.

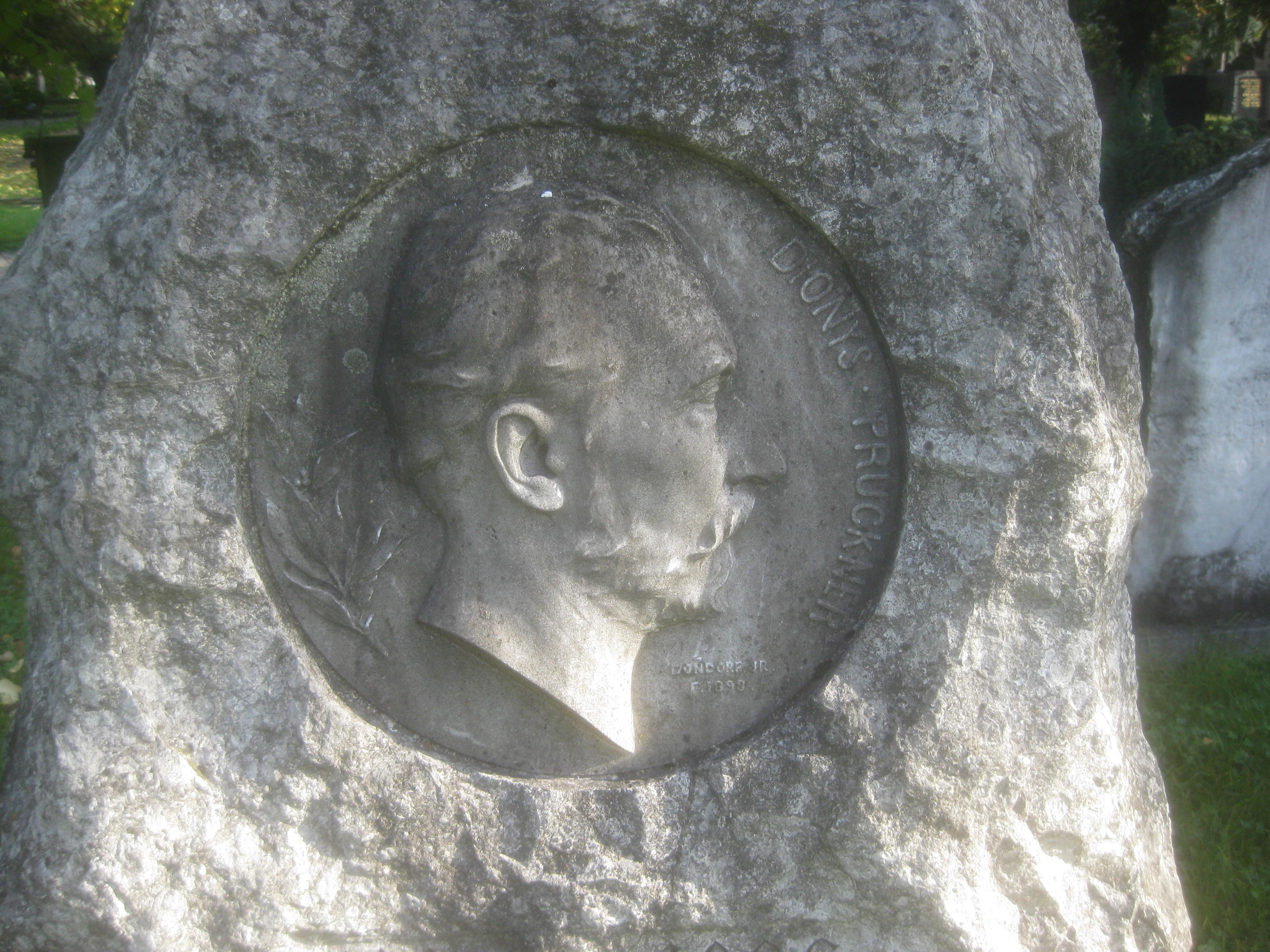
Bronze relief on gravestone.

He is buried in Section 5 (Abteilung 5) of the Pragfriedhof cemetery in Stuttgart, together with his wife Silly Pruckner (1837–1901). On his gravestone is a bronze relief of his head made by the sculptor Karl Donndorf in 1893.

== Sources ==
- The Musical Times and Singing Class Circular, "Obituary: Frans Bouman", Vol. 38, No. 647. (Jan. 1, 1897), pp. 49–50. JSTOR 3368594
