= Sigmund Lebert =

German pianist and music teacher (1821–1884)

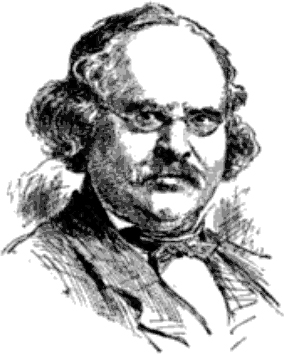

Sigmund (Zygmunt or Siegmund) Lebert, born Samuel Levi on 12 December 1821 in Ludwigsburg and died on 8 December 1884 in Stuttgart, was a German pianist and music teacher.

Lebert was one of the founders of the Stuttgart Music School. With Ludwig Stark and others he prepared a large number of works for the use of students there, including the Grosse theoretisch-praktische Klavierschule, a piano method which was translated into several languages and widely distributed in both Europe and America. Together with Franz Liszt and the cooperation of Ignaz Lachner, Vincenz Lachner and Immanuel Faisst, he created arrangements of piano works by Wolfgang Amadeus Mozart, and with Hans von Bulow, the famous Cotta edition of the piano sonatas of Ludwig van Beethoven published in 1881. His students included Olga Radecki.
