= Hugh Brown =

Hugh Brown may refer to:

== Sports ==
- Hugh Brown (golfer) (c. 1850–?), Scottish golfer
- Hugh Brown (boxer) (1894–1935), British boxer
- Hugh Brown (Queen's Park footballer), Scottish footballer who made one appearance for Queen's Park in 1915
- Hugh Brown (sportswriter) (c. 1906–1985), British-born American sportswriter
- Hugh Brown (footballer, born 1921) (1921–1994), Scottish footballer, played for Partick Thistle, Torquay United and Scotland
- Hugh Brown (footballer, born 1940), Scottish footballer, played for Kilmarnock, Dumbarton and Scotland under-23

== Others ==
- Hugh Stowell Brown (1823–1886), Christian minister and preacher
- Hugh D. Brown (fl. 1887–1893), Irish Association Baptist author, pastor-teacher, politician and President of the Irish Baptist Association
- Hugh Auchincloss Brown (1879–1975), electrical engineer best known for advancing a theory of catastrophic pole shift
- Hugh B. Brown (1883–1975), American and Canadian attorney, educator, and Latter-day Saint leader
- Hugh Brown (politician) (1919–2008), Scottish Member of Parliament
- Hugh Ned Brown (1919–2011), American fund-raising consultant
- U Brown (Huford Brown, born 1956), Jamaican reggae deejay and producer
