= Dilworth =

Dilworth may refer to:

== Places ==
- Dilworth, Lancashire, an ancient township in the Ribble Valley, Lancashire, England, which today is part of the small town of Longridge
- Dilworth, Minnesota, United States
- Dilworth Mountain, in Kelowna, Canada
- Dilworth (neighborhood), in Charlotte, North Carolina, United States
- Dilworth, Oklahoma, United States

== People ==
- Norman Dilworth (1931-2023), English artist
- Hiram Powers Dilworth (1878—1975), American poet and piano player
- Isabel Craven Dilworth, American actress known professionally as Nina Romano
- James Dilworth (1815–1894), New Zealand farmer, investor, speculator and philanthropist
- John R. Dilworth (born 1963), American animator, actor, writer, director, storyboard artist, and producer
- J. Richardson Dilworth (1916–1997), American businessman and professor
- Nelson S. Dilworth (1890-1965), American farmer and member of the California Legislature
- Richardson Dilworth (1898–1974), American politician mayor of Philadelphia, Pennsylvania
- Robert P. Dilworth (1914–1993), American mathematician
- Thomas Dilworth (died 1780), English cleric

== Other uses ==
- Dilworth's theorem in mathematics
- Dilworth School in Auckland, New Zealand
