= College of Music of Cincinnati =

College in Cincinnati, Ohio (1878–1955)

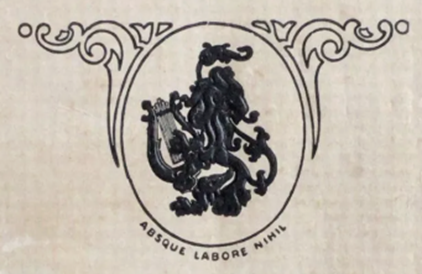
- Other name: Cincinnati College of Music
- Motto: Absque Labore Nihil
- Type: Private
- Active: October 14, 1878–July 31, 1955
- Founders: Reuben R. Springer and George Ward Nichols
- Location: 1227-1235 Elm Street, Cincinnati, Ohio, United States
- Successor: Cincinnati College-Conservatory of Music

The College of Music of Cincinnati, also known as the Cincinnati College of Music, (Note: Although frequently referred to as the Cincinnati College of Music, it was officially the College of Music of Cincinnati or College of Music, for short. When the college was established in 1878, there was a pre-existing institution called the Cincinnati College of Music, located on Race Street and overseen by President Dora Nelson.) was an American music school in Cincinnati, Ohio. It was established in 1878 by George Ward Nichols with the financial help of Reuben R. Springer. It merged with the Cincinnati Conservatory of Music in 1955, forming the Cincinnati College-Conservatory of Music, which is now part of the University of Cincinnati.

== History ==
The College of Music of Cincinnati was created by a stock company and the managers of the Music Hall Association; the latter being connected a performance space that is home to the Cincinnati Ballet, Cincinnati Symphony Orchestra, Cincinnati Opera, May Festival Chorus, and the Cincinnati Pops Orchestra. It main sponsor was Reuben R. Springer who contributed $306,750 ($10,233,815 in 2022 money). The College of Music opened on October 14, 1878. The college's objective was to "cultivate a taste for music [and] to organize a school of instruction and practice". Its motto was Absque Labore Nihil.

George Ward Nichols, the college's primary founder, became its president. Famed conductor and violinist Theodore Thomas was the college's first musical director. He recruited the college's 31 faculty members. One of his recruits was Otto Singer who was the assistant musical director and stayed with the college until he retired in 1892. Another was Arthur Batelle Whiting, head of the college's organ department. In the College of Music's first year, Thomas established and trained a student choir and an orchestra. During the 1878 to 1879 school year, the college orchestra performed 24 concerts.

Despite having a four-year contract, Thomas resigned after eighteen months and returned to New York City. Apparently, Thomas did not like Cincinnati and had differences with Nichols, a businessman and journalist, whose primary focus was financial. However, the college continued to thrive and grow. In 1884, it became one of the first music colleges to have its own performance hall.

By 1902, the college had 1,000 students. On September 5, 1902, the day before the start of the school year, an electrical fire caused extensive damage and destroyed two buildings, including The Odeon, the college's main theater and concert hall. 25 studios were destroyed including 25 pianos, three organs, a harp, and several cellos. There was also damage to the adjacent Music Hall. However, the college opened on September 8, using a floor of its dormitory for classrooms. It used the Ohio Mechanics Institutes theater for its recitals.

The college rebuilt Odeon Hall; it was completed in November 1903 but was half the size and fireproof. In 1925, additional faculty were hired due to increases in enrollment. The college maintained itself in the Great Depression by creating a radio broadcast program on WCKY and WLK from 1931 to 1934. In 1936, it added a radio curriculum. Helene Wurlitzer funded the development of a radio and television department. In 1950, television equipment was added, turning the radio program into a Radio and Television Arts Department that taught more than sixty courses. In September 1951, the college admitted its first Black student, Herman Griffin, who enrolled in the radio and television program. The public television station WCET started on the college campus in July 1954.

By 1954, the cost of operating the college was exceeding its income. This was caused, in part, by the college's commitment to providing a faculty of notable musicians and educators. The college merged with the Cincinnati Conservatory of Music in May 1955, forming the Cincinnati College-Conservatory of Music. The new college was on the Cincinnati Conservatory campus. The College of Music's campus officially closed on July 31, 1955. The Cincinnati College-Conservatory of Music merged with the University of Cincinnati in 1962.

== Campus ==
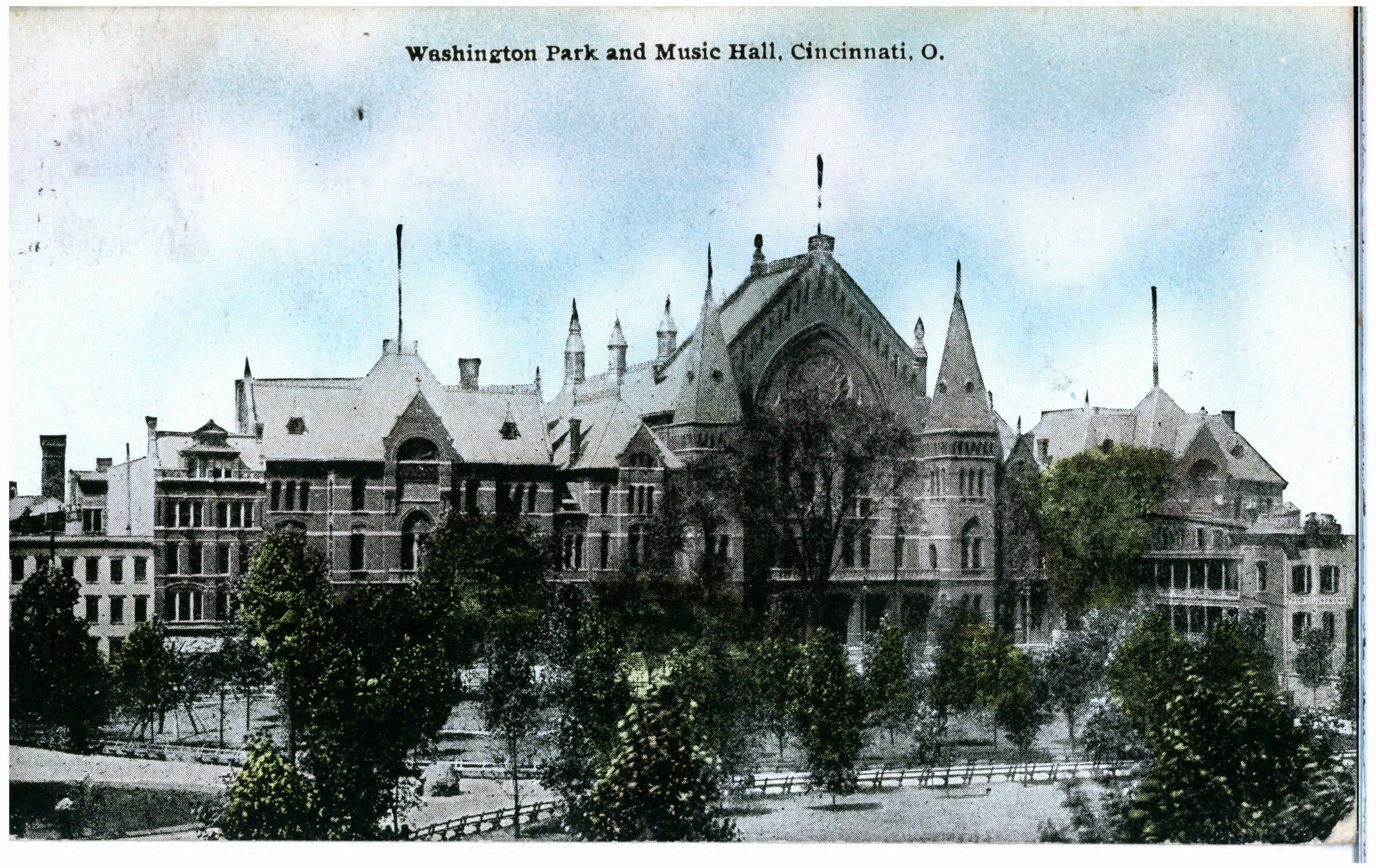
College of Music (far left), Music Hall (center and right), and Washington Park (foreground).

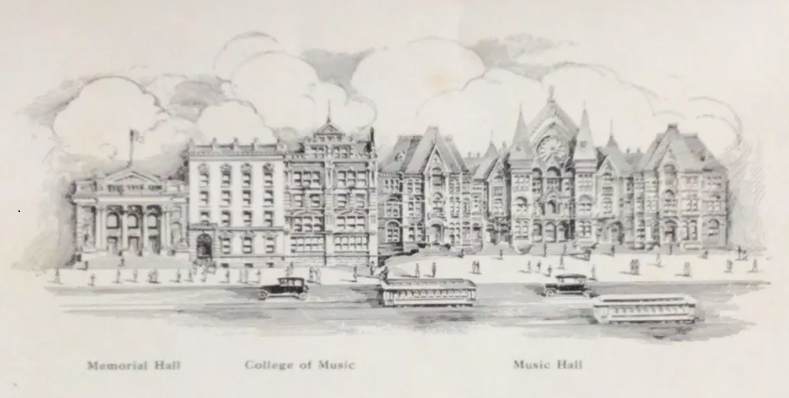
Memorial Hall (left), College of Music (center), and Music Hall (right)

The College of Music was located in downtown Cincinnati, Ohio, across from Washington Park. Initially, classes were held in Dexter Hall on the top floor of Music Hall. By 1881, the college had constructed its own building next door to Music Hall. A covered bridge connected Music Hall to the college buildings.

The four-story tall Odeon Hall was added in 1884 and included classrooms, practice rooms, and the college's main theater concert hall with an organ and seated 1,500 people. The college purchased the adjacent property in 1889 and built Lyceum Hall which faced Grant Street and included lecture halls and a 400-seat auditorium for chamber concerts. In May 1900, John G. Schmidlapp donated $50,000 ($1,935,000 in 2022 money) for the construction of the four-story dormitory; the Emile B. Schmidlapp Dormitory faced Elm Street and was completed in 1902.

In 1902, the college's buildings, with forty classrooms, were valued at $200,000. Odeon and Lyceum were destroyed in the September 1902 fire.

The rebuilt Odeon Hall was finished in November 1903. Its auditorium only seated 700 but featured fireproof construction, including the largest pored concrete balcony at the time. Mrs. Frederick Alms funded a second dormitory in 1921. In addition, an administrative building was added in 1927, facing Central Parkway. Other buildings included Dexter Hall, which housed the television and radio department and a public television station.

The College of Music's only surviving building is its former administration building at 1228 Central Parkway. It is now owned by the Pipe Fitters Union Local #392.

== Academics ==
The College of Music of Cincinnati had both an academic department and a general school of music. It taught beginners and experienced musicians. The college offered a Bachelor of Music and a Master of Music. In 1925, some of its departments were boys choir, double base, dramatic art and expression, harmony and counterpoint, modern languages, opera, organ, pianoforte, voice, viola, violin, violincello, theory and composition, and public school music. Later, it had a radio and television department.

The college also included the Albino Gorno Memorial Library, dedicated on May 31, 1949.

== Student life ==
The College of Music had several fraternities. The first was Phi Mu Alpha Sinfonia, a social fraternity for men with a special interest in music, which opened a chapter in 1903. A chapter of the music women's fraternity Sigma Alpha Iota was established there in 1915. A chapter of Delta Omicron, a co-ed professional music honors fraternity, was chartered at the College of Music in 1918. That was followed by a chapter of the music sorority Mu Phi Epsilon in 1923. Phi Beta, a professional fraternity for the creative and performing arts, had a chapter starting in 1933. There were also student groups like the Three Arts Club.

== Notable people ==
=== Alumni ===
- Max Bendix – concert violinist and conductor
- Clarence Adler – pianist
- Bill Berry – trumpeter and jazz musician
- Ernest L. Blumenschein – artist and founding member of the Taos Society of Artists
- Walter Connolly – character actor
- Hiram Powers Dilworth – pianist and poet
- Bertha Foster – dean of music and founding regent of the University of Miami
- Nahan Franko – violinist, conductor, and concert promoter
- Dora Henninges Heinsohn – opera singer
- Corinne Stocker Horton – elocutionist, journalist, newspaper editor, and clubwoman
- Jean Allard Jeancon – anthropologist
- Winston E. Kock – electrical engineer
- Thurlow Lieurance – songwriter
- Ruth Lyons – pioneer radio and television broadcaster
- Estella Louise Mann – singer, recording artist, and record company executive
- Colin O'More – concert singer, music educator, and pioneering broadcasting executive
- Grace Porterfield Polk – composer, singer, and poet
- Joseph Samuels – musician and bandleader
- Theodore Spiering – violinist, conductor, and teacher
- Margaret McClure Stitt – dramatist
- William Stoess – music arranger, musician, conductor, and composer
- Sarah "Sallie" Frances Thornley – dean of the University of North Texas College of Music
- Burnet Tuthill – musicologist and conductor

=== Faculty and staff ===
- Max Bendix (professor of violin) – concert violinist and conductor
- Hugh Ned Brown (administration) – fundraiser
- Leandro Campanari (professor of violin, 1890 to 1896) – Italian violinist, conductor, and composer
- Pietro Floridia (faculty) – Italian composer of classical music
- Albino Gorno (director of the piano department, dean of the college) – pianist and dean for more than forty years
- Simon E. Jacobsohn (director of the violin department) – violinist and founder of the Jacobsohn Violin School
- Henry Edward Krehbiel (faculty) – musicologist and chief music critic of The New York Tribune for more than forty years
- Lotte Leonard (faculty) – German concert soprano
- Jennie Mannheimer (director of the drama department) – elocutionist, acting coach, speech and drama teacher, and founder of the Cincinnati School of Expression
- Włodek Pawlik (master class instructor) – Polish composer and jazz pianist
- Henry Schradieck (professor of violin and college president) – German violinist, music pedagogue, and composer
- Otto Singer (assistant music director, teacher of piano and theory) – German musician best known for his piano transcriptions of orchestral works
- Theodore Thomas (musical director) – violinist, conductor, and orchestrator
- Frank Van der Stucken (faculty) – composer and conductor
- Arthur Batelle Whiting (head of the organ department) – composer and pianist

== See also ==
- List of university and college mergers in the United States
- Music school
