= Heinsohn =

Heinsohn is a surname. Notable people with the surname include:

- Dora Henninges Heinsohn (1861–1900), American opera singer
- Gunnar Heinsohn (1943–2023), German sociologist and economist
- Tom Heinsohn (1934–2020), American basketball player
