= Hugh Browne =

Hugh Browne may refer to:

- Hugh Browne (businessman) (1829–1905), Australian businessman and Spiritualist
- Hugh Browne (rugby union) (1905–1983), Royal Navy commander and Ireland international rugby union player
- Hugh M. Browne (1851–1923), American educator and civil rights activist

== See also ==
- Hugh Brown (disambiguation)
