= Max Bendix =

American violinist and conductor (1866–1945)

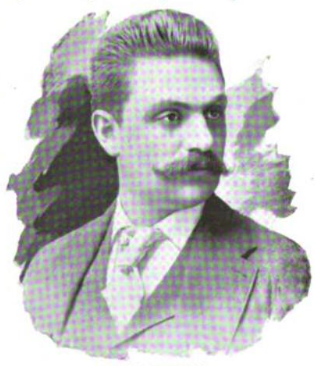
- Max Bendix, 1893

Background information
- Born: March 28, 1866; Detroit, Michigan, US
- Died: December 6, 1945 (aged 79) Chicago, Illinois, US
- Occupations: Concertmaster, conductor, violinist, and professor
- Instrument: Violin
- Formerly of: Theodore Thomas Orchestra; Bendix String Quartet; McCaull Opera Company; Germania Symphony Orchestra; Frank Van der Stucken Orchestra; Damrosch Orchestra; Chicago Symphony Orchestra; Metropolitan Trio Club; Manhattan Opera Company; Metropolitan Opera; National Symphony Orchestra; Royal English Opera; St. Louis Municipal Opera; Illinois Symphony Orchestra

Max Bendix (March 28, 1866 – December 6, 1945) was an American concert violinist, conductor, and teacher. He was the first concertmaster of the Chicago Symphony Orchestra and was also the concertmaster of the Metropolitan Opera orchestra. Bendix wrote several works for orchestra and some incidental music as well as songs. In 1899, the Musical Courier called Bendix "the finest American violinist".

== Early life ==
Bendix was born in Detroit, Michigan on March 28, 1866. He was the son of German-born Jewish parents, Bertha (née Tobias) and William Bendix, a composer. His mother was a cousin of the German composer Felix Mendelssohn and was an heir to his estate. In 1872, his family moved to Cleveland, Ohio.

Bendix first performed as a soloist violinist when he was eight years old. He attended the Cincinnati Conservatory of Music in Cincinnati, Ohio, graduating with the gold medal when he was fourteen years old in 1880. He then studied violin with Simon E. Jacobsohn at the College of Music of Cincinnati. He also received additional violin training in New York City and Berlin.

== Career ==
Bendix played violin with the Theodore Thomas Orchestra at the Cincinnati May Musical Festival when he was twelve years old in 1879 and became one of the group's first violinists the next year. He became a concertmaster with the Maratzek in Cincinnati in 1880. Next, he was the concertmaster of the McCaull Opera Company and the Germania Symphony Orchestra between 1883 and 1884 in Philadelphia. He was the concertmaster of the German Opera in New York City under Anton Seidl during the 1885 to 1886 season Also in 1885, he was the concertmaster and soloist with the Frank Van der Stucken Orchestra in New York City.

He became the concertmaster, soloist, and assistant conductor of the Theodore Thomas Orchestra in New York and Chicago from 1886 to 1896, taking a brief hiatus to travel and study. He returned to New York in 1887 and was the concertmaster for the Damrosch Orchestra. In 1888, Bendix became a professor of violin at the College of Music of Cincinnati. He was the first concertmaster of the Chicago Symphony Orchestra from 1891 until 1896.

On October 30, 1891, he was the soloist for the United States premiere of Dvořák's Violin Concerto in a performance with the Chicago Symphony Orchestra, with Theodore Thomas conducting. A reviewer in the Chicago Tribune wrote, "The solo part is, as has been said, one of great difficulty, that of the last movement being especially trying. Mr. Max Bendix met these difficulties and overcame them in most instances with ease. His phrasing is truly exceptional in its artistic beauty and purity. Rarely has a violinist been heard in Chicago who has equaled Mr. Bendix in this respect.”

Bendix was the conductor of the Theodore Thomas World's Fair Orchestra at the World's Columbian Exposition in Chicago in 1893. After leaving the Chicago Symphony in 1897, he gave concert tours across the United States for two years. In 1889, he joined Victor Herbert's Metropolitan Trio Club in New York. He was president of the World's Fair Orchestral Association from 1897 to 1898.

He formed the Bendix String Quartet in 1900 in New York City and founded a School of Music in New York City in 1901. He was the conductor of the World's Fair Symphony Orchestra at the St. Louis World's Fair in 1904. In 1905, he returned to the Metropolitan Opera, working as the concertmaster for the Wagnerian operas. He became a conductor and concertmaster at the Manhattan Opera Company in 1906.

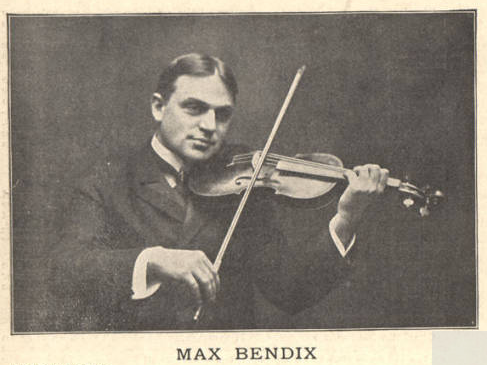
Max Bendix, from a 1904 tour brochure of the Maconda Concert Company.

In 1907, Bendix toured in the United States, followed by a European concert tour in 1908. He returned to the Metropolitan Opera as a conductor in 1909 and 1910. Next, he produced and was also the conductor for operettas in New York and London for Werba and Luescher from 1911 and 1912.

Bendix was the musical director for several Broadway shows, including The Spring Maid (1910), Miss Princess (1912), Her Little Highness (1913), The Amber Empress (1916), Pom-Pom (1916), and Castles in the Air (1926). He was also the conductor for the Broadway shows Girofle-Girofla (1926) and Sari (1930) and wrote incidental music for Experience (1914). He wrote several works for orchestra, including "Thirty-six Songs", "The Sisters", "Tema con Variazioni" and a violin concerto in E minor.

From 1914 to 1915, he was the conductor of the National Symphony Orchestra of Chicago that served as the house band for Midway Gardens, newly designed by Frank Lloyd Wright. At Midway, he developed a schedule that included opera on Mondays, popular music on Tuesdays, symphony on Wednesdays, requests on Thursdays, and Wagner on Fridays. Bendix was the conductor for Henry Wilson Savage from 1916 to 1917, the Fortune Gallo English Opera from 1918 to 1919, the Royal English Opera in 1920, and the St. Louis Municipal Opera in 1920. He was also the first conductor of the Illinois Symphony Orchestra.

He was a conductor of an orchestra of eighty musicians at the Panama–Pacific International Exposition in San Francisco in 1915 and the director of music for the Chicago World's Fair of 1933.

== Personal life ==
Benidx's wife was named Angelica. They had a daughter, Anya. Bendix is sometimes listed as the father of actor William Bendix, but he was William's uncle. One of his brothers was the composer and musical director Theodore Bendix.

He was a member of numerous clubs in New York City, including The Bohemians, Deutscher Press, The Lambs, the Liederkranz of the City of New York, and the Lotos Club. He lived at The Lambs from 1914 to 1918. He was also a member of the Savage Club in Chicago, Illinois.

Bendix moved to Chicago in 1933. In his later years, he lived in the Home for Aged Jews on Drexel Road. Bendix died of a stroke while at the Michael Reese Hospital in Chicago on December 6, 1945, at the age of eighty years. He was buried in the Oak Woods Cemetery in Chicago.
