= Otto Singer =

German musician (1833–1894)

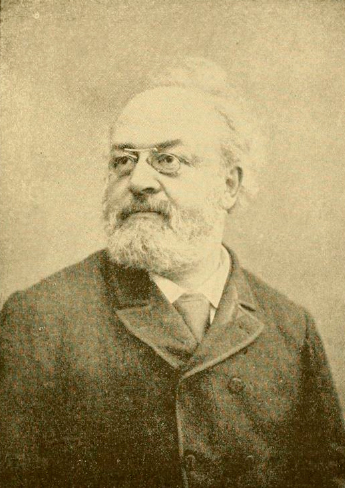
Otto Singer in 1889

Otto Singer (July 26, 1833 – January 3, 1894) was a German musician also active in the USA. He is best known for his piano transcriptions of orchestral works, including symphonies by Beethoven, Brahms, Bruckner, Mozart and Tchaikovsky.

== Life ==
Singer was born in Sora, Saxony. He was educated in Dresden, and later in Leipzig until 1865, and after a short residence in Weimar with Franz Liszt went to New York in 1869.

In 1873 he went to Cincinnati as assistant musical director, under Theodore Thomas, of the first May Musical Festival, in that year. He composed the cantata The Pilgrim Fathers for the festival of 1876, and Festival Ode for the opening of the music-hall in 1878. He also wrote a Rhapsodie for Piano and Orchestra in C major (1881) dedicated to Hans von Bülow. He remained with the Cincinnati College of Music until 1892, when he returned to New York, where he died.

He was an earnest and aggressive disciple of Liszt and Richard Wagner both in his compositions and piano performances. He conducted various singing societies, and in addition to the cantata mentioned he composed some piano sonatas and a piano concerto. Otto Singer Jr., his son (September 14, 1863 – January 8, 1931), composer and conductor, produced piano transcriptions of all nine of Beethoven's symphonies, at least 57 of Liszt's songs, all four of Brahms's symphonies, vocal-piano reductions (vocal parts plus solo piano) of 12 of Wagner's operas (as well as instrumental solo piano versions for some of them), as well as transcriptions of other works by Richard Strauss, Brahms, Beethoven, Bruckner, Tchaikovsky, Mozart, and Mahler, among others.

He was the teacher of the American composer, Wilson G. Smith.
