= Flora Warren Seymour =

American lawyer and writer

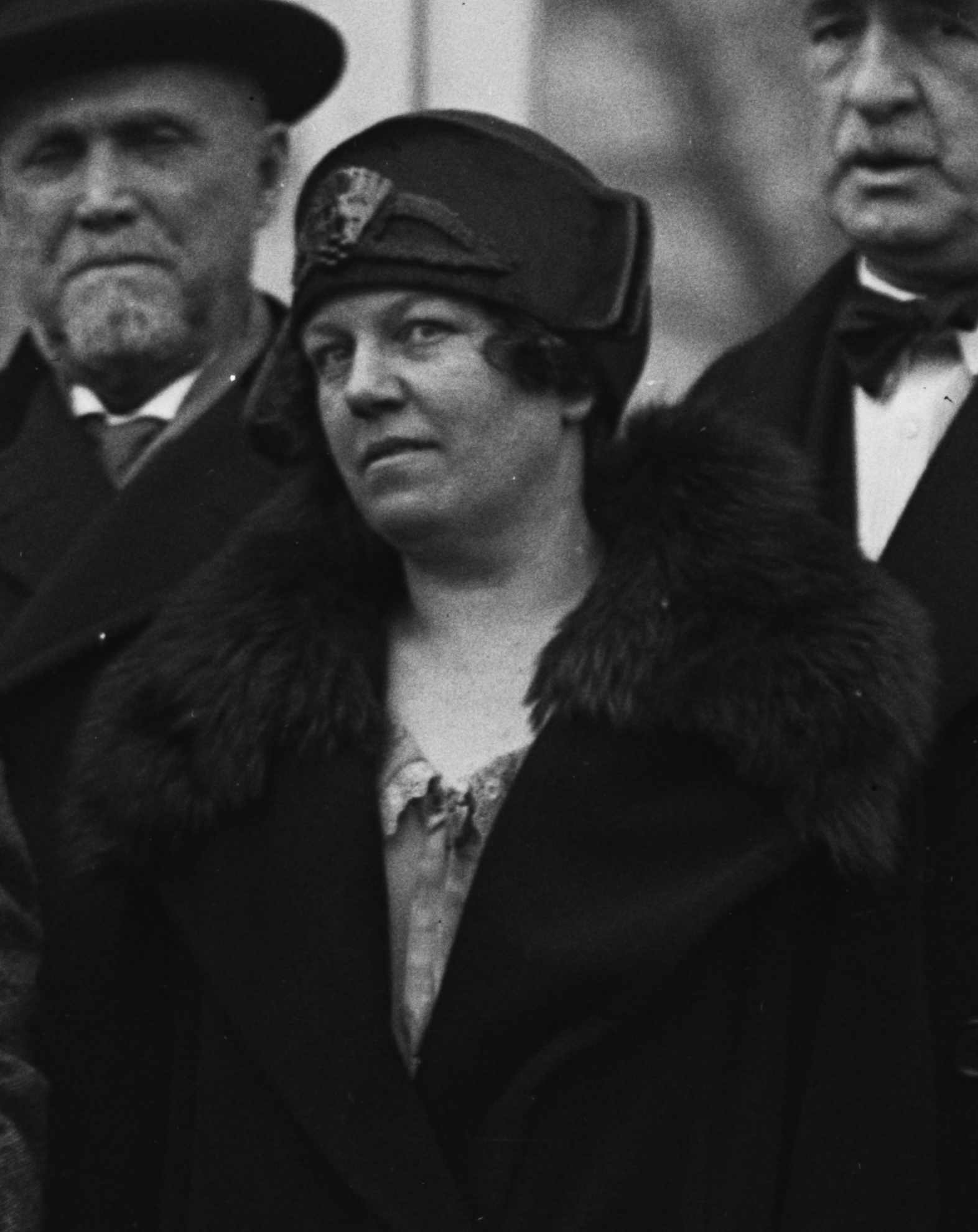
- Seymour in 1925
- Born: Flora Warren Smith; 1888; Cleveland, Ohio, US
- Died: December 10, 1948 (aged 59–60); Chicago, Illinois, US
- Education: George Washington University
- Occupations: Lawyer, writer
- Spouse: George Steele Seymour (m. 1915)

Flora Warren Seymour (1888 – 1948) was an American lawyer and author. She was appointed as the first woman member of the Board of Indian Commissioners by President Warren G. Harding.

== Biography ==
Flora Warren Seymour was born as Flora Warren Smith in Cleveland, Ohio, to Eleanor De Forest (née Potter) and Charles Payne Smith.

She spent the majority of her childhood in the Washington D.C. area. She received her B.A. degree, Davis Prize in oratory, Enosinian Society from George Washington University LL. B. degree from Washington College of Law and LL. M. degree from Chicago-Kent College of Law.

== Career ==
She was at the Indian Service while completing her degrees.

In 1916, she was admitted to the Illinois bar. She worked as a lawyer in Chicago.

In 1919, she was admitted to the practice of law before the United States Supreme Court.

"Several former commissioners, such as Flora Warren Seymour and Dr. C.C. Lindquist, continued to oppose Collier and his reform agenda."

On 5 October 1922, Flora Warren Seymour was appointed to the Board of Indian Commissioners.

"Such a proposition implies that while Menominees are not to be trusted individually with a farm apiece, for fear they will lose it, they can collectively be given not only the land, but the management of large power and timber interests, the running of a big sawmill, with the railroad and other activities it entails. Out of nineteen hundred incapacities is to arise a great super-capacity. The whole is to be several times the sum of its parts. The mere statement of this proposition indicates its impractionbility." - Flora Warren Seymour

Many of Seymour's books were about Native Americans.

"White women appointees to the Indian Bureau during the Gilded Age like Florence Etheridge and Flora Warren leveraged maternalistic guardianship over Native peoples into potent examples of civic authority for the women’s suffrage movement. By contrast, some Native employees like Gertrude Bonnin, a Sioux woman, became staunch defenders of tribal sovereignty and cultural autonomy."

She was, for a time, the editor of Quest magazine and the assistant editor of the Women Lawyers Journal.

== Order of Bookfellows ==
With her husband she helped found the Order of Bookfellows - a Chicago-based literary society (subscription-based publishing) and then served as its executive head. She also helped publish and edit its organ, the monthly magazine The Step-Ladder from 1919 through 1943, which featured prose and poetry by its members.

In 1928, The Step Ladder offered three poetry prizes: the George Sterling Memorial Prize; the Sperling Sonnet Prize; and the Jeannette Chappel Competition.

Notable members of the Order of Bookfellows include: Esther Nelson Karn, Annie Wells Cannon, Frederick Starr, Elkanah East Taylor, and Grace Porterfield Polk.

== Personal life ==
In 1915, she married George Steele Seymour (1877–1945), an author, an assistant general auditor, who joined the Pullman Co. in 1910, and was a member of the Illinois bar.

She lived at 431 S. Dearborn St., 5529 Dorchester Ave., and 4917 Blackstone Avenue in Chicago. She died in Chicago on December 10, 1948.

== Works ==
=== Plays ===
- Seymour, Flora Warren (1924). What do we mean by Indian?. Home Missions Council of North America – via archive.org.

=== Books ===
- William De Morgan, a Post-Victorian Realist (Chicago: The Bookfellows, 1920) (William De Morgan)
- The Five Civilized American Indian Tribes (Girard, Kansas: Haldeman-Julius Company, 1924)
- The Story of the Sioux Indians (Girard, Kansas: Haldeman-Julius Company, 1924)
- The Indians of the Pueblos (Girard, Kansas: Haldeman-Julius Company, 1924)
- History of the New York Indians (Girard, Kansas: Haldeman-Julius Company, 1925)
- The Indians Today (Chicago: Benjamin H. Sanborn & Company, 1926)
- Songs from the Stepladder (Chicago: The Bookfellows, 1927)
- The Boys' Life of Frémont (New York: The Century Company, 1928)
- The Boys' Life of Kit Carson (New York: The Century Company, 1929)
- The Story of the Red Man (New York: Longmans, Green and Co., 1929)
- Women of Trail and Wigwam (New York: Woman Press, 1930)
- Sam Houston, Patriot (New York: The Century Company, 1930)
- Lords of the Valley: Sir William Johnson and his Mohawk Brothers (New York: Longmans, Green and Co., 1930)
- Daniel Boone: Pioneer (New York: The Century Company, 1931)
- The Story of the Red Man (New York: Tudor Pub. Co., 1934)
- Meriwether Lewis: Trail Blazer (New York: D. Appleton-Century Co., 1937)
- La Salle, Explorer of Our Midland Empire (New York: D. Appleton-Century Co., 1939)
- We Called Them Indians (New York: D. Appleton-Century Co., 1940)
- Indian Agents of the Old Frontier (New York: D. Appleton-Century Co., 1941)
- The Indian in American Life (New York: Friendship Press, 1944) (Gilbert Quinn LeSourd (February 1, 1887 - June 22, 1962) was the owner of Friendship Press, a printing house focused on missionary texts and maps, now, the publishing arm of the National Council of the Churches of Christ in the USA)
- Sacagawea: Bird Girl (Indianapolis: Bobbs-Merrill, Co., 1945)
- Pocahontas: Brave Girl (Indianapolis: Bobbs-Merrill, Co., 1946)

=== Articles ===
- "Land Titles in the Pueblo Indian Country", American Bar Association Journal. Vol. 10, No.1, 1924. p. 37.
- "Burlesquing the American Indian", Woman Lawyers' Journal. Vol. 13, No.2, 1924. pp. 3–6.
- "Our Indian Land Policy". The Journal of Land & Public Utility Economics. 2 (1): 93. January 1926. doi:10.2307/3139099.
- "Report on the Mescalero Indian Reservation, New Mexico," June 6, 1932, BIA, vol. 10
- "Indian Service Educational Activities in the Southwest," July 28, 1932, BIA, vol. 10
