= St. Francis Hospital (Cincinnati, Ohio) =

- U.S. National Register of Historic Places
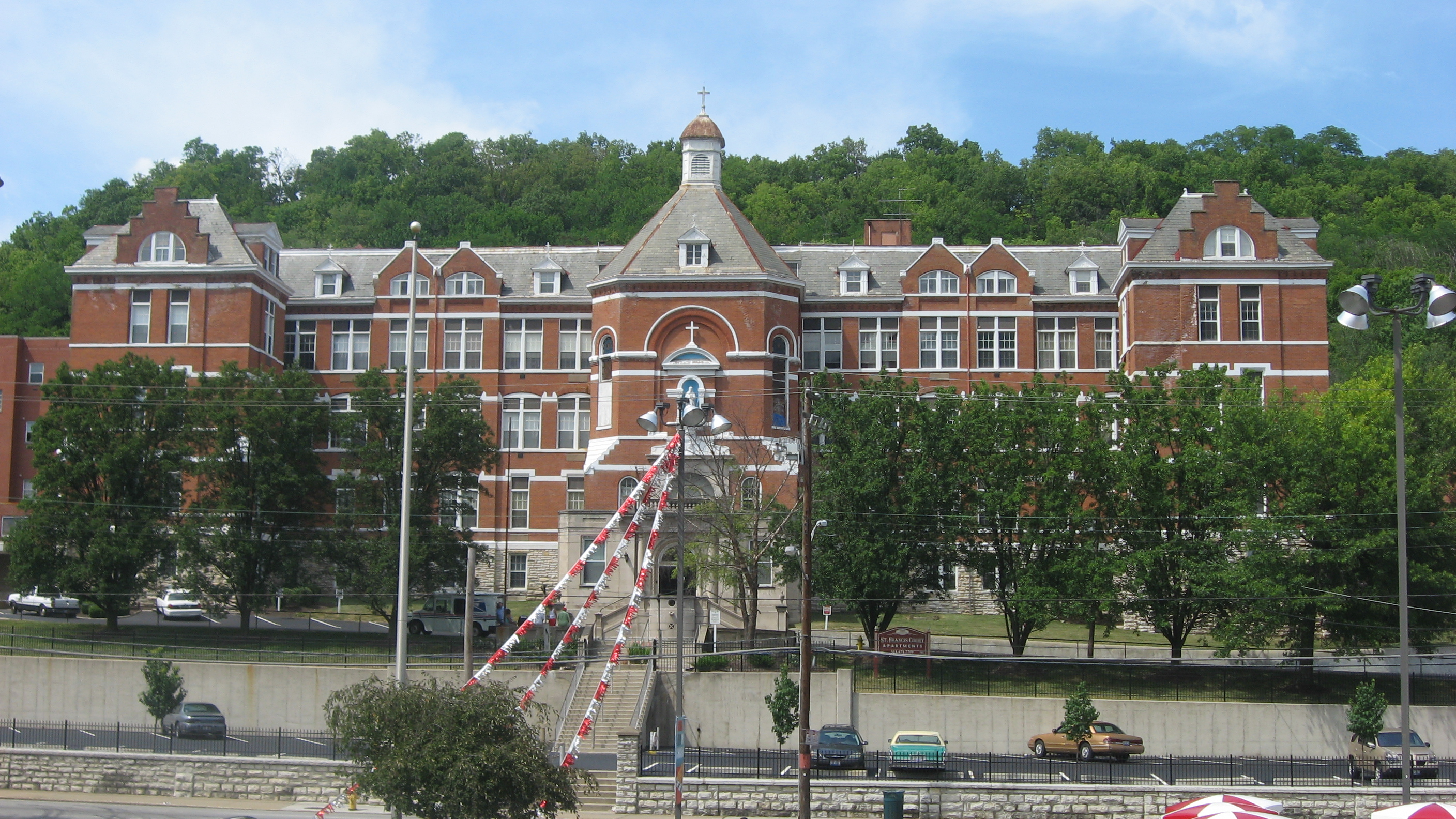
- Front of the hospital

- Location within Ohio Location within the United States
- Location: Cincinnati, Ohio
- Coordinates: 39°7′33.79″N 84°33′33.04″W
- Architect: George W. Rapp
- Architectural style: Queen Anne
- NRHP reference No.: 84003714
- Added to NRHP: April 19, 1984

St. Francis Hospital is a registered historic building in Cincinnati, Ohio, listed in the National Register on April 19, 1984. Opened in 1889 as St. Francis Hospital for Incurables by the Poor Sisters of St. Francis in the United States, it was initially the only hospital west of the Alleghenies with facilities to treat cancer. It operated until 1981.

== History ==
The land on which the former hospital stands had originally been St. Peter's Cemetery, operated by the German Catholic Cemetery Association. In 1849, the directors of the association were discovered to have been selling plots to non-Catholics, which was a violation of church law. This was possibly due to the large number of burials resulting from a cholera outbreak in the city that year. As a result, the cemetery was placed under interdict by John Baptist Purcell, the Archbishop of Cincinnati. This meant the land was no longer consecrated. The graves were moved to Old St. Joseph's Cemetery in the Price Hill neighborhood.

In 1886 the land was donated to the Franciscan Sisters on the condition that they build a hospital on it. A $25,000 bequest from Reuben R. Springer (1800–1884) enabled the Sisters to begin construction. Due to the scope of the project and the terrain, construction was completed only in late 1888 and the hospital dedicated by the Archbishop of Cincinnati, William Henry Elder, in December. The hospital opened under the direction of Sister Apollonaire, S.P.S.F., on January 2, 1889, and numbered nearly 800 patients by the end of the year.

By 1938, the number of patients treated at the hospital numbered over 40,000. Of these, about 85% were charity cases, unable to pay for their treatment.

It was determined during the early 1970s that the hospital could no longer continue financially on its own and a merger was arranged with St. George Hospital in Cheviot, Ohio, operated by the Dominican Sisters of St. Mary of the Springs, which took effect in 1974. Both hospitals closed in 1981 when a new joint hospital named St. Francis-St. George Hospital opened in Westwood. The successor hospital subsequently joined Cincinnati's Mercy Health care system, becoming its Western Hills Medical Center which closed c. 2013 as community needs shifted.
