= Esther Nelson Karn =

American writer

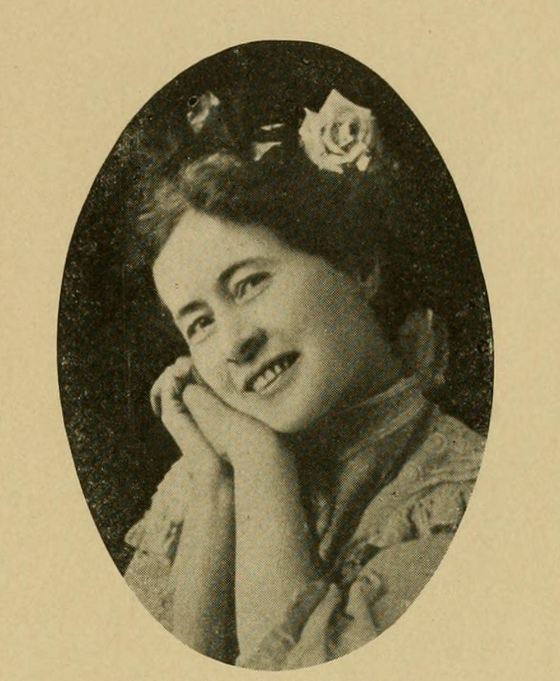
- Esther Nelson Karn, from a 1908 publication
- Born: August 1860; New Philadelphia, Ohio
- Died: April 13, 1936 (aged 75); Allen County, Indiana
- Occupations: Poet, bookkeeper, businesswoman

Esther Nelson Karn (August 1860 – April 13, 1936) was an American poet and business owner, based in Fort Wayne, Indiana.

== Early life ==
Esther (or Hester) Nelson was born in New Philadelphia, Ohio, and raised in DeKalb County, Indiana, the daughter of Hugh Nelson and Lucinda Davis Nelson. She trained to teach at Hicksville High School. She also attended courses at the Detroit School of Journalism and the De Silva School of Oratory in Fort Wayne.

== Career ==
Nelson taught briefly before she married. After she married, she worked as a bookkeeper, and wrote poetry. "The authoress is thoroughly conversant with the ways of nature and has the pleasing faculty of creating within the reader a mood essential to the fullest enjoyment of her theme," according to one reviewer in 1925. She gave public readings of her poems, sometimes with musical accompaniment, and was a member of the Order of Bookfellows, a Chicago-based writers' organization. She also wrote song lyrics. During World War I, she wrote topical lyrics about defeating the Kaiser.

In widowhood after 1904, and after her brother and business partner died in the Spanish flu pandemic in 1919, she continued to run the family's piano store and sheet music business in Fort Wayne, into the early 1930s.

== Publications ==
- Snow-Flakes (1900)
- Violets (1904)
- Wild Roses (1915)
- Lure of the Wilds (1925)

== Personal life ==
In 1882, Esther Nelson married Samuel A. Karn, who was a sales representative for a musical instrument manufacturer. They moved to Fort Wayne and opened a music store. The S. A. Karn Music Company was incorporated as a business in 1902, with Esther Karn as one of the directors. Her husband died in 1904. She died in a hospital in Allen County, Indiana in 1936, from cancer, at the age of 75.
