= Elkanah East Taylor =

American poet

- Born: 1888
- Died: August 7, 1945 (aged 56–57); Norfolk, VA
- Education: Sweet Briar College, William and Mary College
- Occupation: Poet
- Spouse: Edwin Jordan Taylor

Signature
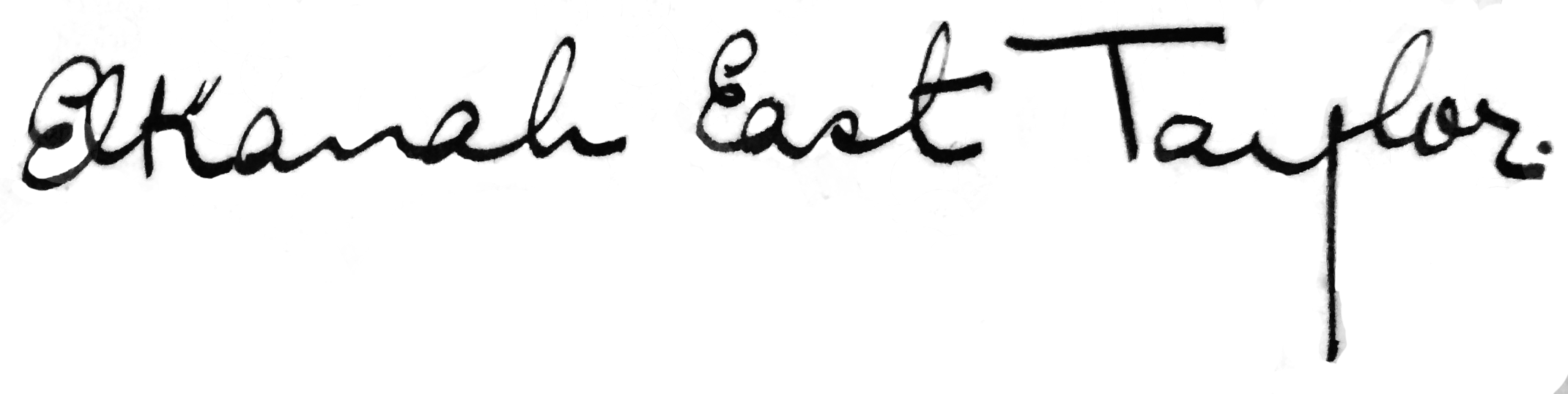

Elkanah East Taylor (1888 - August 7, 1945) was an American poet and founder of the Will-o'-the-Wisp poetry magazine.

== Life ==
Elkanah East was born in Virginia in 1888, and as a child she contributed poetry and stories to magazines. She attended Maury High School and in 1906 entered Sweet Briar College for women as part of the first freshman class. She graduated from Sweet Briar and continued her studies at the College of William and Mary where she graduated in 1919. She was married to fellow William and Mary graduate Edwin Jordan Taylor of Hampton, VA, and they had a son, William East Taylor. Elkanah East Taylor lived in Driver, Nansemond County, Virginia for 30 years.

Elkanah East Taylor was a member of many poetry organizations, and in 1925 she founded the Will-o’-the-Wisp magazine of verse. In 1926, The Editor of the Literary Lantern said that the Will-o’-the-Wisp might shortly be one of the literary journals that “died to make verse free.” Taylor responded directly with; “When earth’s last picture is painted, and the tubes are twisted and dried ‘Willo’-the-Wisp’ Will still be in existence.” She worked as editor of the magazine for 20 years until her death.

Elkanah East Taylor died a widow in Norfolk, VA at the age of 57 on August 7, 1945. Taylor is buried at the Forrest Lawn Cemetery in Norfolk, VA.

== Organizations ==
- State chairman of poetry for Virginia Federation of Women’s Clubs
- Member of Poetry Society of America
- Member of National League of American Pen-Women
- Member of Poetry Society of Virginia
- Member of American Literary Association
- Member of Norfolk Society of Arts
- Member of the Order of Bookfellows
- Member of the Empire Poetry League of London
- Honorary Member of Alabama State Poetry Society
- Honorary Member of Springhill College Poetry Society

== Works ==
=== Books of poetry ===
- Whisperings and Other Poems (1919)
- Candles on the Sill (1927) published by James T White and Co
- Dust and Flame (1923)
- Pen-Points (1928)
- A Spray of Mistletoe (1931)

=== Other contributions ===
- Editor of Will-o’-the-Wisp (1925-1945)
- The World News, Roanoke, VA (1922)
- Daily Press, Newport News, VA (1925, 1926, 1928, 1929, 1931, 1933, 1940)
- Anthology of Magazine Verse (1925, 1926)
- One for Posterity, Henry Harrison, An Anthology Comprising What in the Opinion of Each of the 145 Contributors is His Best Poem (1929)
- In the Light of Day Anthology, New York
- Unison: A Selection of Poems from Choir Practice, ed. Ellen M. Carroll (1930)
- As The Poet Says, Benjamin Musser (1931), Prose anthology
- Contemporary Verse, Poetry Review (London), Muse and Mirror, Interludes, American Poetry Magazine, Stardust, Poetry of Today
