= Springer School and Center =

School dedicated to children with learning disabilities

The Springer School & Center
- School logo

Location
- Cincinnati, Ohio; United States; 39.1327°N 84.4594°W

Information
- Type: Independent school
- Religious affiliation: Archdioces
- Established: 1971
- Founder: Reuben Runyan Springer
- Grades: 1-8
- Student to teacher ratio: 6:1
- Accreditation: Independent Schools Association of the Central States
- Website: springer-ld.org

Springer School and Center is a school in Cincinnati, Ohio dedicated to helping students with learning disabilities to lead successful lives.

== History ==
It was established in 1887 as the Cathedral School for the Archdiocese. Philanthropist Reuben Runyan Springer donated the funds to create the school, which served children with special needs, initially for hearing-impaired students.

In 1969, a community needs assessment conducted by the University of Cincinnati prompted Springer to expand focus to educating children with learning disabilities. In 1971 Springer became an independent elementary school.

Before 1981, the school occupied several different buildings. In 1981, it moved into the former St. Mary High School.

Since 1992, Springer has been accredited through the Independent Schools Association of the Central States, see National Association of Independent Schools.

The Springer Center opened in 1999 to provide information, services, and programs related to learning disabilities.

Springer School and Center begin to offer high school programs in 2023 and the first seniors graduate in 2027.

Springer high school is planned to be moved to the Doherty campus in fall of 2027. renovations are expected to begin in July of 2027.
