= Charlotte Maconda =

American soprano singer (1863–1952)

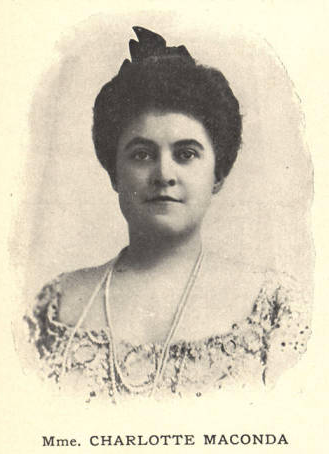
Charlotte Maconda, from a 1904 brochure.

Charlotte Maconda (March 12, 1863 – May 15, 1952) was an American soprano singer.

== Early life ==
Charlotte Maconda Maginnis was born in Jersey City, New Jersey, the daughter of William Henry Maginnis and Jenette Morgan Whittlesey Maginnis. She was named for her maternal grandmother, Charlotte Maconda Morgan Whittlesey (1805–1865), who helped her husband Oramel Whittlesey (1801–1876) to found Music Vale Seminary in Salem, Connecticut. She studied voice with Emma Fursch-Madi.

Sculptor Bela Pratt was Charlotte Maconda Maginnis's first cousin.

== Career ==
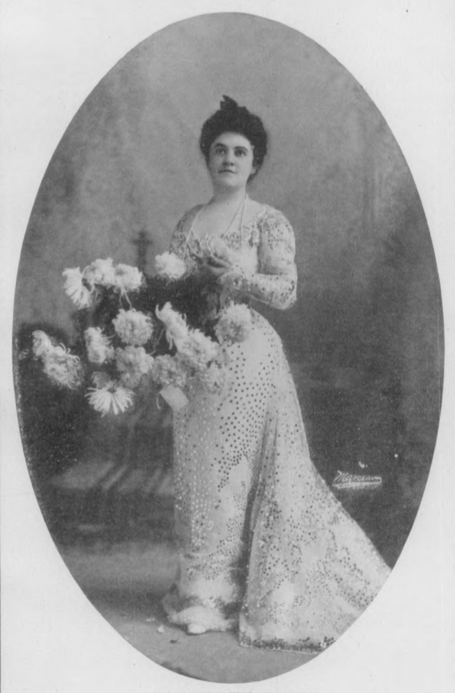
1905

Early in her career, she was sometimes billed as "Carlotta Maconda", and toured as a member of the Boston Ideal Opera Company from 1888 to 1890, in the same cast as Jessie Bartlett Davis. In 1890 she sang in the operas Der Freischütz, Mignon, Les Huguenots, and L'Africaine, with the Emma Juch Grand English Opera Company. Maconda sang at the Metropolitan Opera House twice in 1899. In 1903-1904 she and Max Bendix toured with several others as the Maconda Concert Company. "Maconda has such unusual personal magnetism, in addition to a voice of delightful quality," reported a 1907 magazine, "that she quickly becomes a favorite wherever she sings."

In 1910, she traveled to Havana, Cuba to sing in La Bohème at the city's new opera house. Among her students in the 1920s was Daisy Pettit Elgin of Texas.

== Personal life ==
Charlotte Maconda married theatrical manager William Wellington Walters in 1894. "In private life Madame Maconda has no striking peculiarities to make her remarkable," opined a 1907 newspaper writer. "When she is not filling concert and orchestral engagements she lives quietly in New York with her husband." She died in 1952, aged 89 years, in New York City.
