= Cincinnati Music Hall =

Historic performance hall in Ohio, US

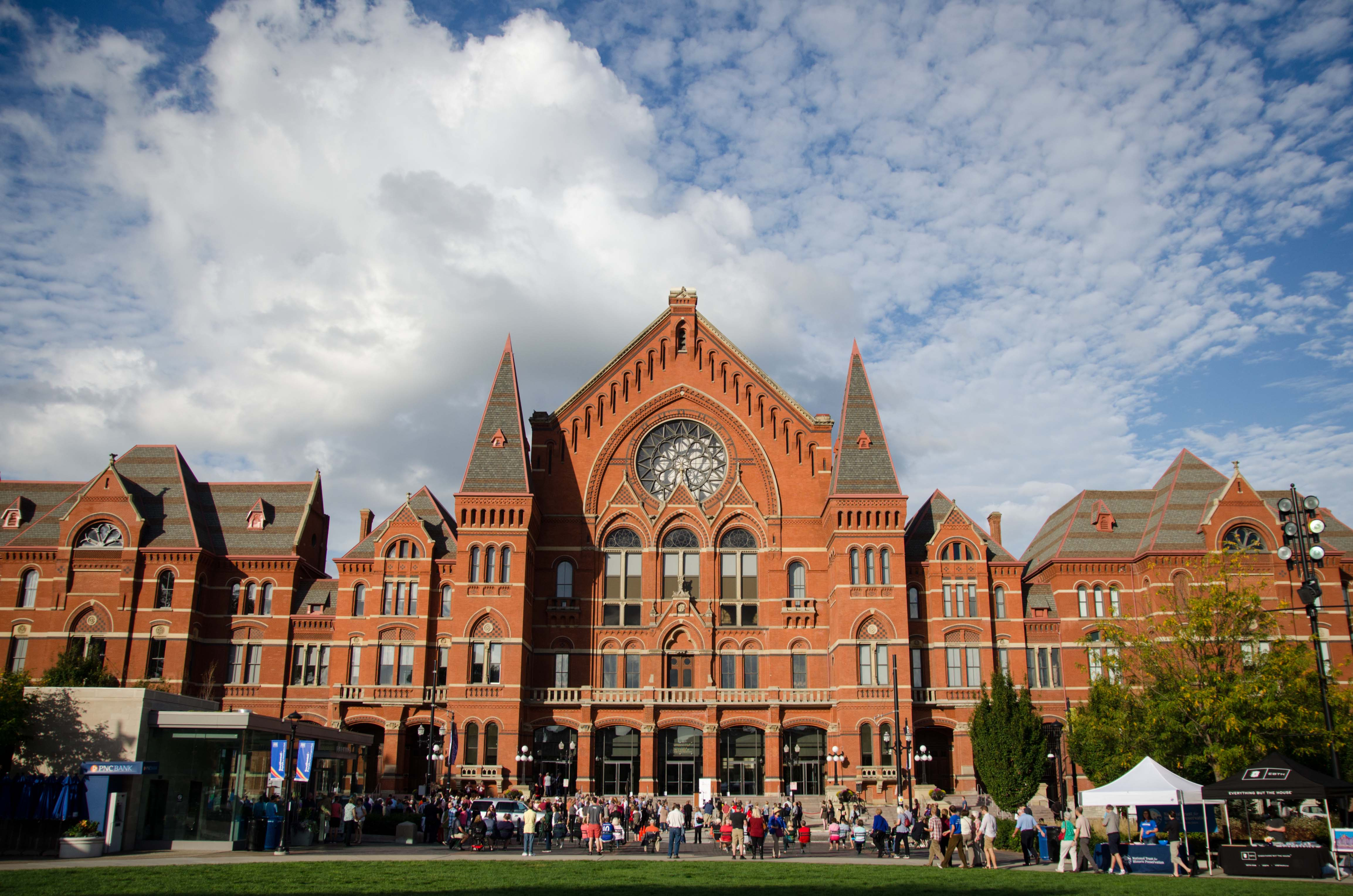
- Interactive map of Cincinnati Music Hall
- Address: 1241 Elm Street; Cincinnati, Ohio; United States
- Coordinates: 39°6′34″N 84°31′8″W
- Operator: Cincinnati Arts Association
- Capacity: 2,289 (Springer Auditorium); 1,300 (ballroom)
- Public transit: Connector at 14th & Elm; Metro; Red Bike

Construction
- Built: 1876–1878
- Opened: 14 May 1878
- Renovated: 1969–1975, 2016–2017

Tenants
- Cincinnati Ballet; Cincinnati Opera; Cincinnati Pops Orchestra; Cincinnati Symphony Orchestra; May Festival Chorus

Website
- www.cincinnatiarts.org/music-hall-home
- Cincinnati Music Hall
- U.S. National Register of Historic Places
- U.S. National Historic Landmark
- Cincinnati Local Historic Landmark
- Architect: Hannaford, Samuel, & Sons
- Architectural style: Venetian Gothic
- MPS: Hannaford, Samuel, & Sons TR
- NRHP reference No.: 70000496

Significant dates
- Added to NRHP: January 26, 1970
- Designated NHL: December 2, 1974

Music Hall, commonly known as Cincinnati Music Hall, is a concert hall in Cincinnati, Ohio, United States, completed in 1878. It serves as the home for the Cincinnati Ballet, Cincinnati Symphony Orchestra, Cincinnati Opera, May Festival Chorus, and the Cincinnati Pops Orchestra. In January 1975, it was recognized as a National Historic Landmark by the U.S. Department of the Interior for its distinctive Venetian Gothic architecture. The building was designed with a dual purpose – to house musical activities in its central auditorium and industrial exhibitions in its side wings. It is located at 1241 Elm Street, across from the historic Washington Park in Over-the-Rhine, minutes from the center of the downtown area. In addition to classical music, the venue has also hosted pop/rock recording artists.

Music Hall was built over a pauper's cemetery, which has helped fuel its reputation as one of the most haunted places in America.

In June 2014, Music Hall was included on the National Trust for Historic Preservation's annual list of America's 11 most endangered historic places. After being closed for over a year for a $143 million renovation, Music Hall was reopened in 2017.

== Venues ==
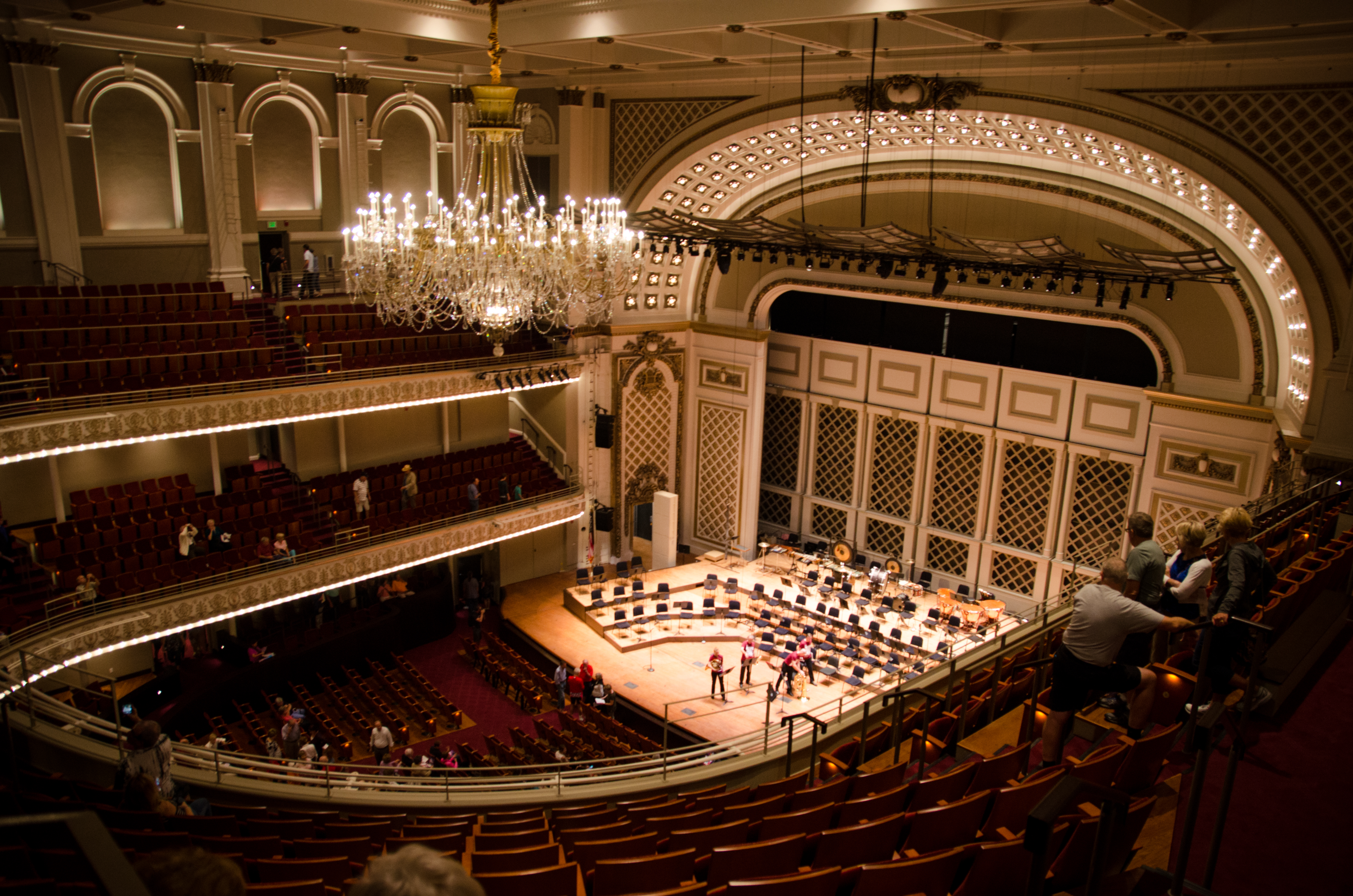
Springer Auditorium

Springer Auditorium is the main auditorium, named in honor of founding patron Reuben Springer. It seats 2,289 people for symphony performances and 2,439 people for the Cincinnati Pops. Prior to recent sweeping revitalization efforts, which eliminated many seats in favor of increasing seat size universally, it was the second-largest traditional auditorium or opera house by capacity in the nation. Springer serves as home for the Cincinnati Symphony Orchestra, the Cincinnati Pops Orchestra, the Cincinnati Ballet, the Cincinnati Opera, as well as the May Festival (the tradition from which the necessity of building such a permanent hall derived).

Springer Auditorium also houses the iconic Music Hall Chandelier. The Czechoslovak piece was sent to the United States in pieces, and was officially installed in Springer Auditorium in the early 1970s. It was found and purchased by the Corbett Family as they financed the multi-year renovation of the auditorium. The chandelier weighs approximately 1,500 pounds with a diameter of 21 feet. It includes 96 candles, each lit with an individual bulb.

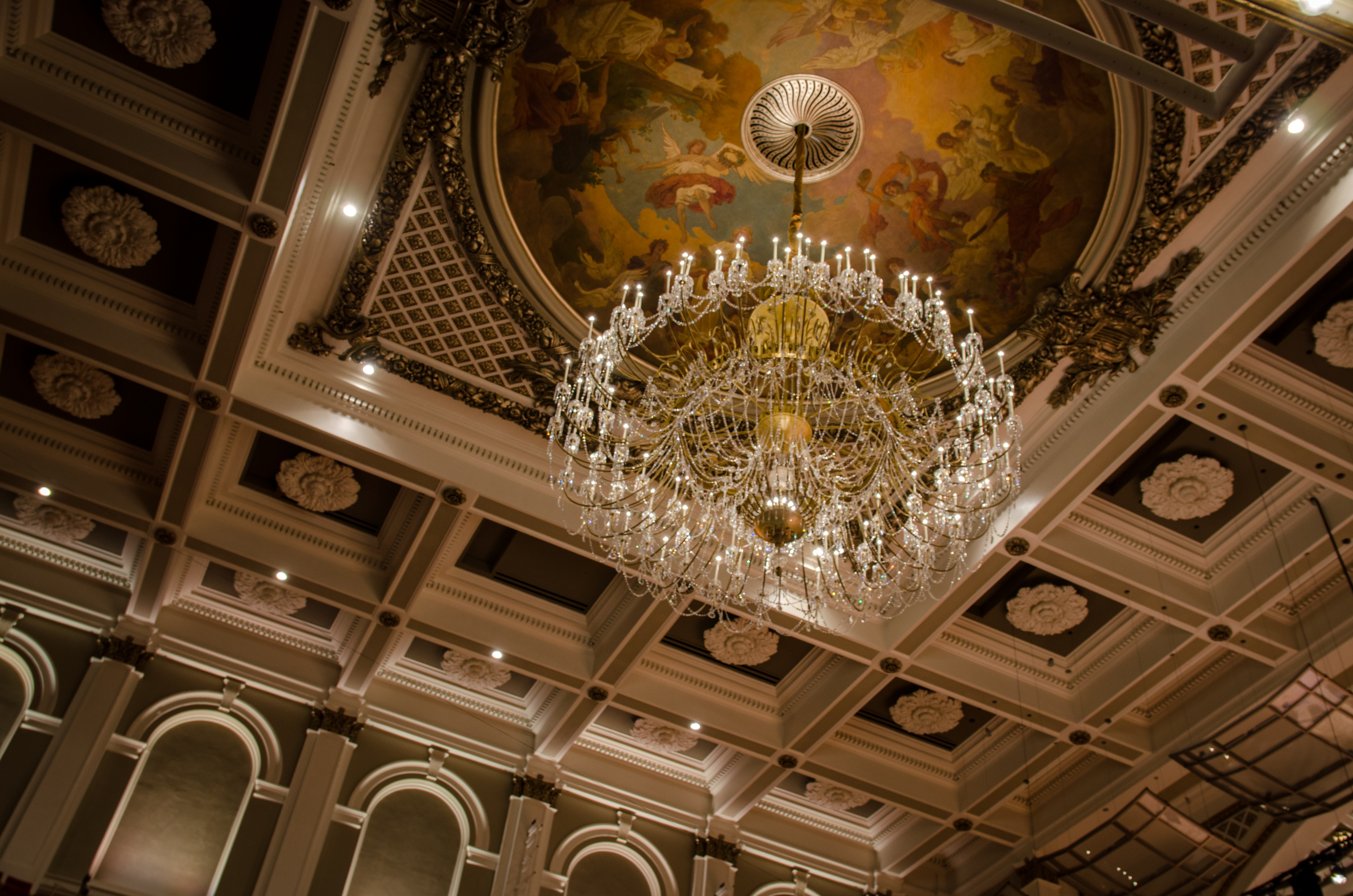
Detail of the auditorium crystal chandelier

Music Hall Ballroom accommodates up to 1,300 people, and is the second largest meeting space in the city, encompassing nearly 20,000 square feet (1,900 m^{2}). It is frequently used for large receptions, exhibitions, fashion shows, class reunions and breakfast, lunch and dinner gatherings.

Prior to 1974, the space was known as the Topper Ballroom. It has been managed by numerous outside organizations since its opening in 1928. The space has undergone numerous renovations such as those in 1935, 1947, and 1959. The ballroom underwent a $1.8 million renovation in October 1998. In July 2007, organ rebuilder Ronald F. Wehmeier of Cincinnati announced the Mighty Wurlitzer theater organ that once graced the old Albee Theater in Cincinnati would be restored and installed in Music Hall's Ballroom for a New Year's Eve 2009 debut.

Corbett Tower was originally known as Dexter Hall, in honor of a member of the Music Hall Building Committee. The third-floor space originally served as a performance hall for the College of Music of Cincinnati. Later, the tower was used for radio and television broadcasts, both for the College of Music and WCET. In 1972 the space was renovated and renamed for longtime Music Hall patrons J. Ralph and Patricia Corbett. The Corbett Foundation financed the renovation and limited restoration of the space again in 1994.

Corbett Tower serves as the setting for a wide variety of events, ranging from weddings and receptions to grand dinners and parties. It has seating for up to 200 and includes a stage, controlled sound and light systems, dance floor, kitchen, and bar facilities. Corbett Tower is located on the third floor near the front of the building.

Wilks Studio is a new, multi-use space added following the 2016–17 renovation of Music Hall. It serves as a rehearsal room or event space for weddings, receptions, fundraisers, meetings, or other gatherings, seating up to 200 people. From the North Concourse on the Balcony Level, enter through the door at the top of the stairs which leads to the Studio Lobby. Additionally, this space is used for rehearsals and small performances by both the Cincinnati Symphony Orchestra and Cincinnati Opera.

Other facilities

The building also contains the Taft Suite, a private space that stores the restored panels of the historic Hook and Hastings Organ, and well as the Music Hall Foyer, which is used as a gathering space for both larger performances and private events.

== Architecture ==
Cincinnati Music Hall was designed by architect Samuel Hannaford and is considered one of the last and best examples of the Victorian Gothic Revival Style. Some of the spaces most notable features include the steeply pitched gable roof, the corbelled brick, the tracery featured on the front windows, and the large rose window on the facade of the building. Additionally, the facility varies from a traditional performance hall in the fact that Music Hall is actually made up of three distinct buildings; Music Hall, the North Exposition Building, and the South Exposition Building. The design includes carriage passageways designed for easy entrance in the case of bad weather.

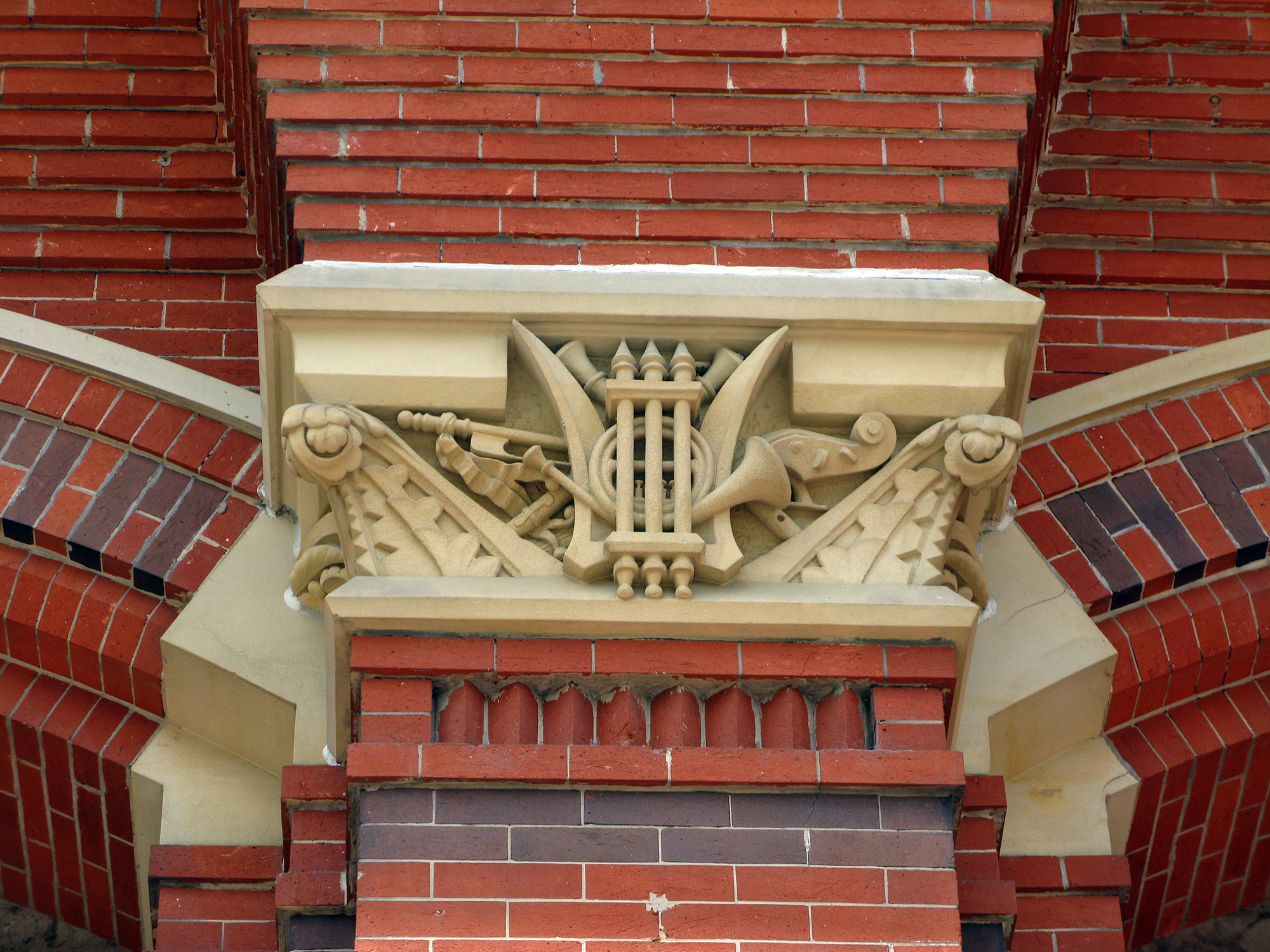
Detail of the structure's music-themed ornamentation

Each building includes individual sandstone carvings, designed to display the different purposes of each space. The center building, Music Hall, has musical instruments such as French horns included on the facade, flowers and birds are included on the South Exposition Hall to represent its horticultural heritage, and scientific tools are featured on the North Exposition Hall to represent its mechanical heritage.

The building was also known for its detailed brickwork, which included both carved and painted details on the building's exterior. However, during the 1969–1975 renovation, the building's exterior was sandblasted, destroying the majority of these details.

== History ==
=== Pre-construction ===
On September 13, 1818, the City of Cincinnati purchased a plot of land from Jesse Embree for $3,200 on the west side of Elm Street, just north of 12th Street. On January 22, 1821, the Ohio State Legislature passed an act that established "a Commercial Hospital and Lunatic Asylum for the state of Ohio." Thus, Ohio's first insane asylum was erected in Cincinnati on 4 acres (16,000 m^{2}) of land bounded by the Miami and Erie Canal. The Commercial Hospital and Lunatic Asylum of Ohio was the parent institution for the Orphan Asylum, the City Infirmary, the Cincinnati Hospital, and Longview Asylum. Cincinnati Hospital, the main facility, was located along the canal at 12th and Plum Streets, which is now 12th and Central Parkway.

Following the Cholera outbreak of 1832, the land was used as a "pauper's cemetery" until 1857 when city encroachment on the neighborhood made it unsuitable for such uses. Serious complaints from abutting property owners forced the "Pest House" to be relocated outside of the city limits. On January 29, 1859, the city converted the property into the Elm Street Park, and the land and buildings were used for exposition purposes until 1876 when it was turned over to the Music Hall Association.

=== Choir festivals and expositions ===
Cincinnati's first industrial exposition, which was in 1869, was a great success so the city wanted to expand it the following year. At the same time, German musicians had plans to erect "a great temporary building opposite Washington Park" for the North American Saengerbund, which Cincinnati was to host during the summer of 1870. The two competing groups reached an agreement to construct a building that would be shared. Depending on its use, the building was sometimes called Exposition Hall or Saengerfest Hall.

==== Exposition Hall ====
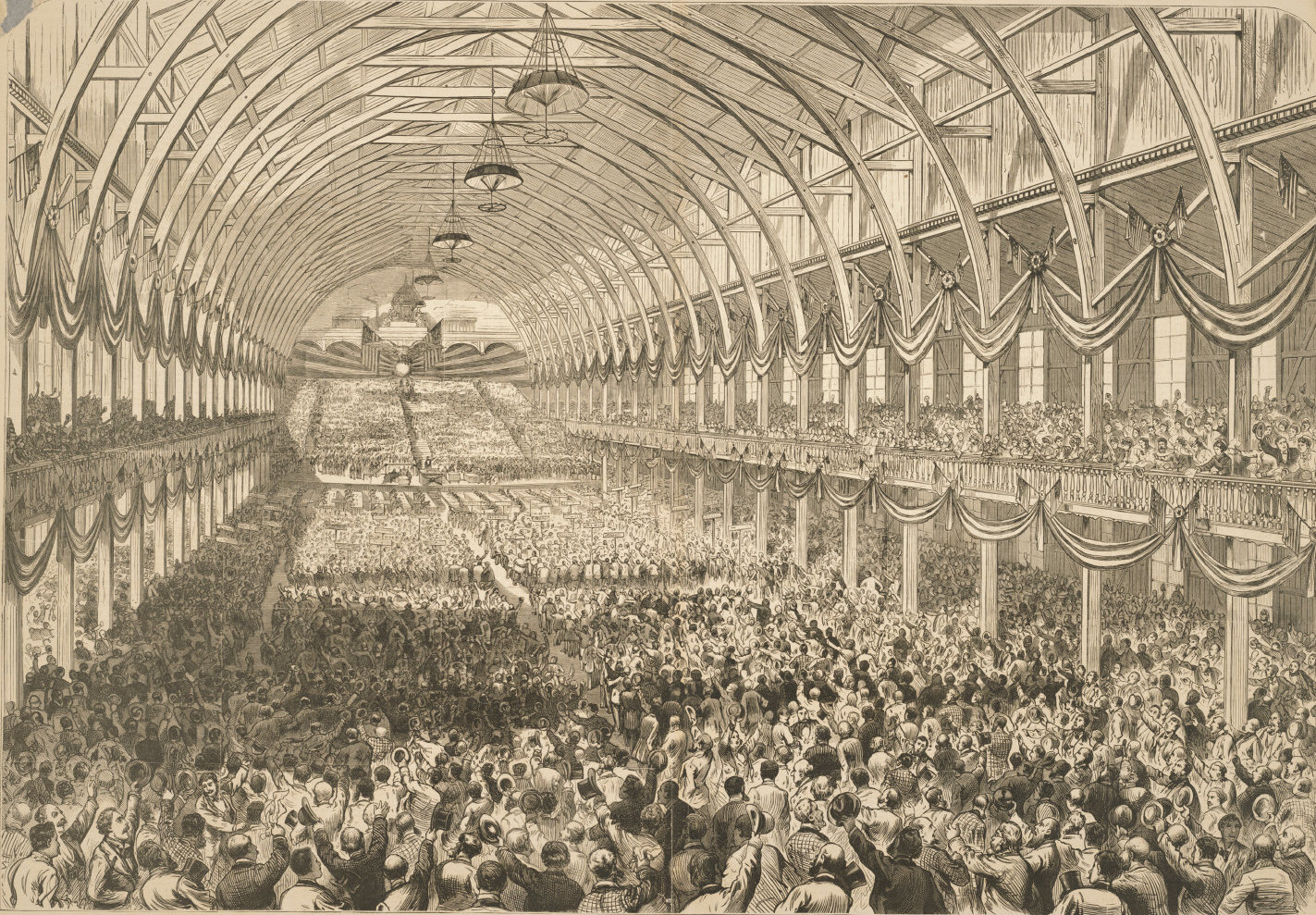
Exposition Hall was the site of the 1876 Republican National Convention.

Exposition Hall was a huge wooden structure measuring 250 feet (76 m) long, 100 feet (30 m) wide, and 80 feet (24 m) tall. Additionally, there were three other temporary buildings attached to it for a total floor space of 108,748 sq ft (10,103.0 m^{2})—more than that of the 1853 World's Fair in New York City. It was the location of the 1876 Republican National Convention, which nominated Rutherford B. Hayes for the presidency. The roof of the building was covered in tin. According to lore, a thunderstorm arose during an 1875 May Festival performance. Rain on the tin roof grew so loud that the chorus was drowned out and the performance had to stop. In the audience during that performance was Reuben R. Springer (1800–1884), a wealthy Cincinnatian of German ancestry, who afterwards decided Cincinnati needed a more permanent structure.

=== Construction ===
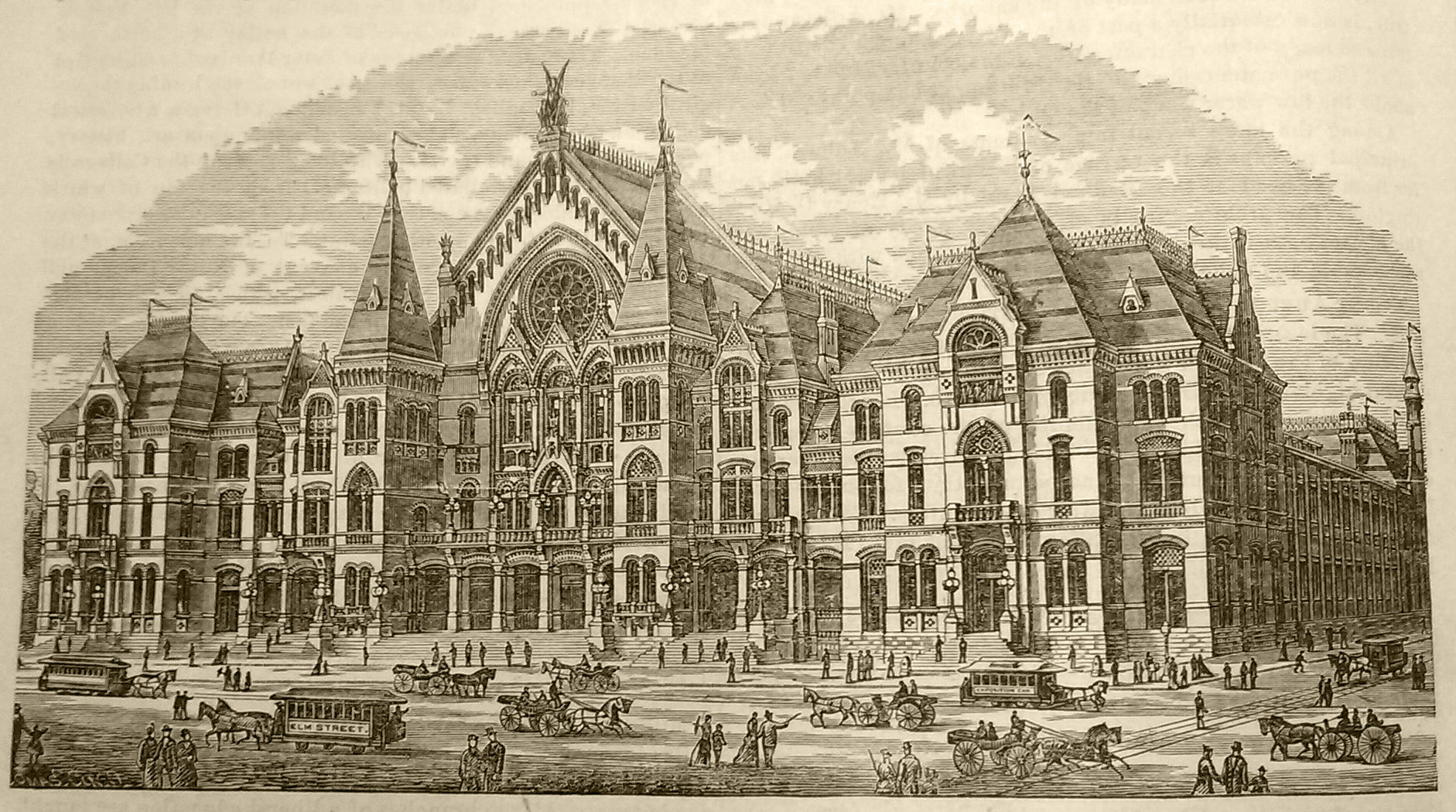
The original design of Music Hall

Springer, influenced by the beneficial results the industrial expositions and musical festivals had on the city, wrote a letter in May 1875 to John Shillito, owner of Shillito's department store, offering to donate $125,000 under two conditions. First, that the site be free from taxation, and second, that a further sum of $125,000 be raised by the community. When only $106,000 was raised Springer donated an additional $20,000. From the outset, the musical and industrial interests collided, so Springer offered an additional $50,000 if $100,000 could be raised. This additional sum of money would be used for the construction of buildings around the hall for the purpose of holding industrial expositions. The total cost of Music Hall was $300,962.78 with the exposition wings an additional $146,331.51.

Along with other community leaders such as Julius Dexter, W. H. Harrison, T. D. Lincoln, Joseph Longworth, Robert Mitchell, John Shillito and Reuben Springer organized the Music Hall Association to build the new hall. The group oversaw the construction and fundraising necessary to complete the space.

Construction on Cincinnati Music Hall began in 1876, shortly after Hannaford and Porter was given the contract. The project was divided into multiple phases, first focusing on the construction of the center building, Music Hall. Following several issues regarding weather and resources, the project was fast tracked in hopes of completing work on Music Hall prior to the 1878 May Festival Chorus performance.

After Music Hall was completed, new funds were raised and resources were allocated for the completion of both the Northern and Southern Exposition Halls, two spaces utilized as the City of Cincinnati's primary convention spaces from their construction through the 1970s.

Although the three buildings were constructed separately, they were immediately joined using second story passageways. This allowed for events to span all three spaces while also allowing several groups to share this space at once.

=== Completion ===
The first performance took place on May 14, 1878. An estimated 6,000 saw the opera Alceste by Christoph Willibald Gluck performed, as well as Beethoven's Eroica symphony. These performances were especially significant as they included the May Festival Chorus and the Cincinnati Opera, two groups that were officially transitioning from other venues, such as the Cincinnati Zoo, to Music Hall as their permanent homes. Music Hall was then used independently for over a year, until both the North and South Exposition Halls were officially completed on September 2, 1879.

=== Performances and events ===
In addition to Music Hall's traditional role of housing the city's major arts organizations and formerly the college of music, the building served as Cincinnati's major convention center through the 1970s, when the Duke Energy Convention Center was built.

As early as 1879, Music Hall began to see notable guests such as President Ulysses S. Grant. He spoke at the venue on December 12, 1879. He addressed the public at Music Hall and the venue was overflowing with people according to the Cincinnati Enquirer. The building has also hosted numerous other presidents such as William McKinley, Theodore Roosevelt, Benjamin Harrison, and Dwight D. Eisenhower.

June 22–24, 1880, the Democratic National Convention was held at Music Hall. This event resulted in the nomination of Winfield S. Hancock of Pennsylvania for president and William H. English of Indiana for vice president in the United States presidential election of 1880. This event was noteworthy due to the unique addition of Western Union Telegraph Wires to Music Hall for convention use, which had not been completed for major performance halls in the past.

Over time, the space also hosts numerous, notable musical performances such as the well known conductor, Richard Strauss in 1904, the world premier of the opera The Taming of the Shrew in 1953, and many other musical performances.

Prior to being given their own homes, several Cincinnati organizations were housed in music hall including the Cincinnati Art Museum, the Cincinnati College of Music, the Cincinnati College of Engineering, and the television station WCET. The hall also housed a roller skating venue in one of the exposition halls for over 30 years, and was home to the Ohio Valley Exposition for over half a century.

Musical acts that have performed at Cincinnati Music Hall include: French organist Alexandre Guilmant in 1898, Frank Sinatra in 1941 and 1993, The Ink Spots (from Indianapolis) in 1943, Ella Fitzgerald in 1956 and 1974, Johnny Cash in 1957 and 1981, Ray Charles in 1961 and 1962, Fats Domino in 1964 and 1966, the Velvet Underground in 1966, Sonny Bono (& Cher) in 1967, Big Brother and the Holding Company (with Janis Joplin) in 1968, Grateful Dead in 1972, Pink Floyd in 1972, Miles Davis in 1974 and 1987, Bruce Springsteen in 1996, and The White Stripes in 2005. B. B. King performed at the venue five times, starting in 1970. Over the Rhine has performed at the venue on four occasions, beginning in 1996.

The Cincinnati Symphony Orchestra produced a projection mapping event called Lumenocity on August 3–4, 2013, August 1–3, 2014, August 5–9, 2015, and August 5–7, 2016. The program incorporated a diverse array of visual elements never before presented with a live orchestra. The event was very popular, and was the first step in creating the city-wide projection mapping event called Blink.

=== 2016–2017 renovation ===
In 2016, Cincinnati Music Hall was closed for a 14-month, $143 million renovation. This included the addition of 30,000 additional square feet of usable space, as well as the structural and cosmetic renovation of the buildings traditional performance and event spaces. Approximately half of the renovations funding was provided by private donors, while the other half came from public funding sources such as the City of Cincinnati and tax credits from the State of Ohio. The space officially opened to the public on October 6–7, 2017, with a weekend of performances and tours of the building.

== Paranormal ==
Various employees of Music Hall have described experiencing strange events in the facility, while others say they have never experienced anything. In the 2005 documentary Music Hall: Cincinnati Finds Its Voice, Patricia K. Beggs, the CEO of the Cincinnati Opera, acknowledged, "Ghosts? Um, yes. Indeed, there are Music Hall ghosts." Erich Kunzel, late conductor for the Cincinnati Pops, once stated, "Sometimes when I was arranging, getting things together, I've worked here all night long. So I've met these people. They're not in the offices, but when you go out into the house they're there, they're upstairs. ... If you think I'm crazy just come here sometime at three o'clock in the morning. They're very friendly."

Ghosts were first reported before Music Hall was built, after the ground was first excavated for an Exposition Hall elevator.

Neither Marie Gallagher, who worked at Music Hall for 25 years, nor Ed Vignale, facilities engineer, have experienced anything unusual at Music Hall. Viganle noted that some strange sounds could be attributed to Music Hall's acoustical ability to project sounds.

Music Hall was selected as one of The Travel Channel's Most Terrifying Places in America and for the SYFY TV show Ghost Hunters.

== See also ==
- List of concert halls
- List of opera houses
- List of reportedly haunted locations in the United States
