= Theodore Bendix =

American composer and musical director (1862–1935)

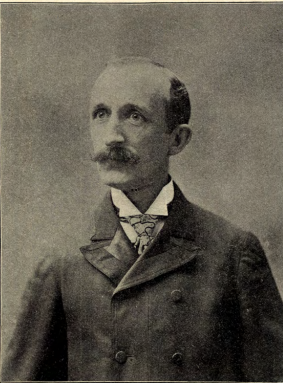
Theodore Bendix

Theodore Bendix or Theo. Bendix (July 25, 1862 – January 15, 1935) was an American composer, classical violinist, musical director, and opera conductor. He became a professional musician at the age of thirteen and was hired as a conductor for an opera company when he was sixteen. Before he was eighteen, he had written the music for the show, resulting in the hit song "My Sweetheart".

Bendix worked with numerous theaters and opera companies and was a musical director and composer with Florenz Ziegfeld, Henry Wilson Savage, Klaw and Erlanger. He was the musical director for several Broadway shows, including The Belle of New York, Ben-Hur, and Beauty and the Beast. He also established a music publishing firm, Theo Bendix Music Publishing Co. in New York City. In his time, Bendix was one of the best-known musical directors of popular music.

== Early life ==
Bendix was born on July 25, 1863, in Detroit, Michigan. He was the son of German-born Jewish parents, Bertha (née Tobias) and William Bendix, a composer. His mother was a cousin of the German composer Felix Mendelssohn and was an heir to his estate. His brother, Max Bendix, was also a composer, violinist, and conductor.

In 1872, his family moved to Cleveland, Ohio where his father was the orchestra leader at the Euclid Avenue Opera House. He first studied music under his father, learning the piano and the violin. When he was thirteen years old, Bendix played with his father's orchestra at the Euclid Avenue Opera House.

== Career ==
While he studied music, Bendix worked as an actor. When he was sixteen in 1880, he was hired as the conductor of the Alice Oates Opera Company. In 1887, he became the director of the Aimee Opera Company. In 1881, he wrote the popular tune, "My Sweetheart" and other music for a play by the same name that was performed by this company. Bendix went on to compose many songs for the pianos and orchestras that were popular in their era. His most famous composition was "The Dawn of Love".

He became the director of the Chestnut Street Theatre in Philadelphia, followed by directing the orchestra of Pope's Theatre in St. Louis. In 1886, he composed the music and was the musical director for the show Marita and wrote some of the music for Over the Garden Wall. Next, he worked in Boston for nine years, directing the orchestras at the Globe Theatre and the Park Theatre from 1889 to 1900. While at the Globe, he conducted the first performances of Gilbert and Sullivan operettas in the United States. He was orchestra leader at the National Theatre in Washington, D.C. He also organized the Bendix String Quartet which headlined at the Orpheum Theatre in Los Angeles for three seasons.

In the early 20th century, Carl Fischer Music published and distributed a collection of Bendix's compositions for use with silent films. By In 1906, Bendix formed the Theo Bendix Music Publishing Co. in New York City. He also coached opera and concert singers.

Bendix was a conductor for Florenz Ziegfeld, Henry Wilson Savage, and Klaw and Erlanger and also co-composed songs for their productions. He was the musical director of Broadway stage productions, including The Belle of New York at the Casino Theatre, Ben-Hur at the Broadway Theater, and Beauty and the Beast at the Casino Theatre. He was the music director for Ben Hur at the Drury Lane Theatre in London in 1902. He was the music director for A Skylark at the New York Theatre in April 1910. He was also the musical director for The Rose of Panama which opened at Daly's Theatre on Broadway in 1910. In 1911, he wrote music for The Great Name, a play by Henry Kolker that opened at the Cort Theatre.

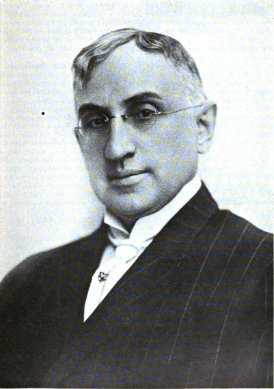
Theodore Bendix, 1920

He was the conductor for the Majestic Theatre in Los Angeles from 1920 to 1930. In November 1920, he was the music director at the Alcazar Theatre in San Francisco for several weeks. In 1928, he was the conductor of the orchestra at Erlanger's Biltmore Theatre in the Millennium Biltmore Hotel in Los Angeles. He returned to New York City in 1931 and operated a musical library off-Broadway in New York City; this collection was sold to a larger organization.

== Personal life ==
Bendix was married to Sally in 1883 but left her after three years. She divorced him on March 25, 1919.

He was a member of the Musicians Union and The Lambs, a social club in New York City for people involved in theater.

Late in life, Bendix lived in the Percy Williams Home for Retired Actors and Actresses in East Islip, New York. He died on January 15, 1935, at the South Side Hospital in Bay Shore, New York after failing to recover from a surgical procedure performed two weeks prior. He was buried in the Kensico Cemetery in Valhalla, New York.

== Selected compositions ==
- "My Sweetheart"
- "This Tone Picture of the North and South"
- "North Star Quickstep". Cleveland: S. Brainard Sons, 1875.
- "Fencibles State March". Philadelphia: William H. Boner, Philadelphia, 1883.
- "Continental Guard's March.. W. F. Shaw, 1883.
- "I Loved Thee". May Fleischmann (lyricist). Boston: Arthur P. Schmidt & Co.1884.
- Alone in London. Boston: Grand Opera House, October 22, 1889.
- "Columbia Phonograph March". Boston: Bates & Bendix Music Publishers, 1894. Plate B. B. 19-4.
- "The Butterfly" (7 inch Performed). Berliner, August 1897.
- "The Dawn of Love" Carl Fischer's Theatre Orchestra Edition, No. 535. New York: Carl Fischer Music, 1898. Plate 5170-18.
- "Victory" (performed by the Boston Symphony Orchestra at a celebration in New York City at the end of the Spanish-American War), c. 1898.
- "The Busy Bee" or "Morceau Characteristique" in The Witmark Theatre & Concert Collection for Orchestra, No. 48. New York: M. Witmark & Sons, 1899. Plate 242-20.
- "In Beauty's Bower". New York: Carl Fischer Music, c. 1899.
- "The King's Bal Masque" with four movements "The Dervishes (Fanatical Dance)New", "Blue Beard and Fatima", "Hindoo Priests (Incantation)", and "The Cossacks (Russian Dance)" in The Witmark Theatre & Concert Collection for Orchestra, Nos. 36-39. New York: Carl Fischer & M. Witmark & Sons, 1899. Plate 194-19.
- "A Southern Reverie". New York: M. Witmark & Sons, 1900. Plate 3546.
- "The Star Dreamer". New York: Carl Fischer & M. Witmark & Sons, 1900. Plate 800-19.
- "The Butterfly Dance" (7 inch Performed). Performed by Sousa's Band. Victor, October 5, 1900.
- "A Southern Reverie (10 inch Performed). Performed by Metropolitan Orchestra. Victor, January 10, 1901.
- "Norwegian Episode" in The Witmark Theatre & Concert Collection for Orchestra, No. 133. New York: M. Witmark & Sons, 1901. Plate 3451.
- "La Gazelle" (10 inch Performed). Performed by Sousa's Band. Victor, April 4, 1901.
- "American Frantasie" (10 inch Performed). Performed by Sousa's Band. Victor, April 5, 1901.
- "The Girl from Maxim's" (7 and 10 inch Performed). Performed by Metropolitan Orchestra. Victor, June 13, 1901.
- "In Beauty's Bower" (7 and 10 inch Performed) Performed by Kendle's First Regiment Band. Victor, December 26, 1901.
- "An American Fantasy" (7 and 10 inch Performed). Performed by Sousa's Band. Victor, December 31, 1901.
- "A Trip to Buffalo". New York: M. Witmark & Sons, 1901.
- "Cousin Kate", dedicated to Ethel Barrymore. New York: M. Witmark & Sons, 1903. Plate 5862-6.
- "Longing". New York: Carl Fischer Music, c. 1903
- "Cousin Kate Waltz" (10 inch Performed). Performed by Arthur Pryor's Band. Victor, April 15, 1904.
- "The Butterfly" (12 inch Performed). Performed by Arthur Pryor's Orchestra. Victor, November 11, 1904.
- "Floral Suite including "Roses", "Pansies (For Thoughts)", and "Daisies" in The Witmark Theatre & Concert Collection for Orchestra, Nos. 186-7. New York: M. Witmark & Sons, 1905. Plate 1039-19.
- "'Tis Better to Have Loved and Lost". B. Johnson and G. Schirmer, words, 1905
- "A Day at West Point." 1906.
- "The Broken-Hearted Sparrow" from the suite "A Love Episode in Birdland". Boston: Walter Jacobs, 1906. Plate 9-18.
- "The Gentle Dove" from the suite "A Love Episode in Birdland". Boston: Walter Jacobs, 1906. Plate 2039-17.
- "The Magpie and the Parrot" from the suite "A Love Episode in Birdland". Boston & New York: Walter Jacobs & Theodore Bendix, 1906. Plate 6-24
- "The Merry Lark" from the suite "A Love Episode in Birdland". Boston: Walter Jacobs, 1906. Plate 11-26.
- "By Right of Sword" (8 inch Performed). Performed by Victor Orchestra. Victor, April 5, 1907.
- "La Gazelle" (10 inch Performed). Performed by Alice J. Shaw. Victor, May 29, 1907.
- "Symposia Waltz" (10 inch Performed). Performed by Victor Orchestra. Victor, August 8, 1907.
- "A Day at West Point" (10 inch Performed) Performed by Arthur Pryor's Band. Victor, September 15, 1908.
- "By Right of Sword" (10 inch Performed). Performed by Arthur Pryor's Band. Victor, March 30, 1909.
- "The Third Degree". New York: Theo Bendix Music pub., 1909. Plate 139-5.
- "A Hungarian Episode". New York: Theodore Bendix Music, c. 1909.
- "The Commuters". New York: Leo Feist, 1910. Plate 2604-3.
- "Miniature Tone Poem" (10 and 12 inch Performed). Performed by the Victor Orchestra. Victor, December 8, 1910.
- "In Meadow Land" in The Witmark Theatre & Concert Collection for Orchestra, No. 325. New York: M. Witmark & Sons, 1911. Plate 1637-20.
- The Great Name. For a Henry Kolker play, 1911.
- "Sweet Jasmine. Intermezzo", 1919.
- "Good Luck Waltz." Cleveland: S. Brainard Sons. c
- "Alone". Boston: Oliver Ditson Company.
- "Beau Brummel". Boston: Oliver Ditson Company.
- "Cradle Song (Visions of Rest)". Boston: Oliver Ditson Company.
- "Elks Quadrille". Boston: Oliver Ditson Company.
- "Golden Gate". New York: Carl Fischer Music.
- "Happy Boys". Cleveland: S. Brainard Sons.
- "Hold the Fort! (Bliss)". Cleveland: S. Brainard Sons.
- "I Am So Shy"..Boston: Oliver Ditson Company.
- "Laughing Eyes".
- "Little Coquette". New York: Carl Fischer Music
- "Little Beauty". Boston: Oliver Ditson Company.
- "Mountain Echoes". New York: Carl Fischer Music.
- "Oriental March". New York: Carl Fischer Music.
- "Sweet Simplicity".
- "To-morrow". Boston: Oliver Ditson Company.
- "Lilly". Church.
