= Grace Porterfield Polk =

American songwriter

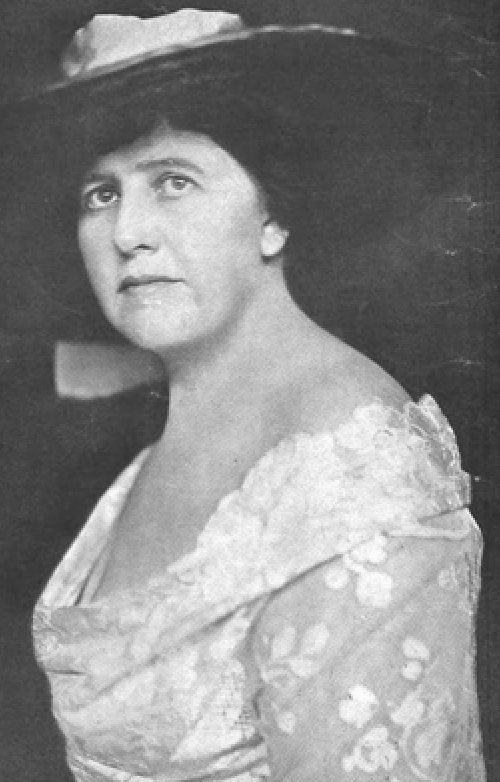
- Grace Porterfield Polk, from a 1919 publication
- Born: September 1875; Preble County, Ohio, United States
- Died: April 8, 1965 (aged 89); Tampa, Florida, United States
- Education: College of Music of Cincinnati
- Occupations: Composer, songwriter, singer, poet, clubwoman

Grace Mae Porterfield Polk (September 1875 – April 8, 1965) was an American composer, singer, and poet, and founder of the American Song Composers' Festival.

== Early life ==
Grace Mae Porterfield was born in Preble County, Ohio and raised in Richmond, Indiana, where she lived from 1882 till 1903. She was the daughter of David Porterfield and Minerva Jane Garland Porterfield. She graduated from the College of Music of Cincinnati. She then studied voice with Oscar Saenger in New York.

== Career ==
Polk was a soprano singer, composer and writer of popular songs. She was first National Junior Counselor of the National Federation of Music Clubs, and founder of the American Song Composers' Festival, an annual event held in Greenwood, Indiana from 1920 to 1922. "In this quiet little Indiana town I will aim to bring together the song composers of the land so the young and ambitious may meet the veterans and successful members of the profession," she explained in 1919. She established the Grace Porterfield Polk Fund, to support cash prizes for a song contest open to Indiana composers. She also established a scholarship for students of composition at Indiana University. She organized the Indianapolis chapter of the National League of American Pen Women in 1923.

Her husband Ralph's business interests meant that the Polks spent much of their time in Florida. There, she sang her own compositions for radio concerts. For example, she was heard performing live on Miami radio station WQAM on several occasions in April 1923, and again in May 1923.

She was a founding member of the Greater Miami chapter of the National League of American Pen Women, and founder and first president of the Miami Music Club in 1920. She was a member of the Inner Circle of Order of Bookfellows, a Chicago-based writers' organization. In Miami, she launched the Cardinal Club, a women's club for grandmothers over the age of 70. "There's not a city, or even a small town, that couldn't make its grandmothers happier, and make itself happier, by doing something for the old folks," she told an interviewer in 1924.

In the 1930s, Polk edited the junior department of American Poetry Magazine, in a section called "Polk-a Dots" after her surname.

== Publications ==
- "Remembrance" (1917)
- "Dawn" (1918)
- "Love's Call" (1918)
- "Lullaby" (1918)
- "Just a Tiny Ray of Sunshine", "We Sing to You America", "My Garden of Roses" (1919)
- "Suffer Little Children to Come Unto Me" (1920)
- "Hoosierland" (1920)
- "Island of Happiness" (1920)
- "Our First Rose" (1920)
- "Glad Tidings: A Christmas Song" (1921)
- "Springtime is Songtime" (1922)
- "Apple Blossom Time in Indiana" (1924)
- "Sunshine Cottage" (1925)
- Blossoms from My Enchanted Garden (1928, poetry)
- Polk-a-Dots for Tiny Tots (1928, poetry)
- Thought Petals (1940, poetry)
- Polk-a-Dot Primer for Poets (1948, booklet)
- Blossomland, Polk-a-Dot Flower Fantasy (1949, operetta)
- My Garden of Music (1964, musical score)

== Personal life ==
In 1903, Grace Porterfield married Ralph B. Polk, who became president of his family's canning company. They had a son, Ralph Jr., and three other children who died young; their baby daughter Grace died from diphtheria in 1914. Her husband died in 1952, and Grace Porterfield Polk died at her home in Tampa, Florida in 1965, at the age of 89.
