= Board of Indian Commissioners =

US Native American policy committee

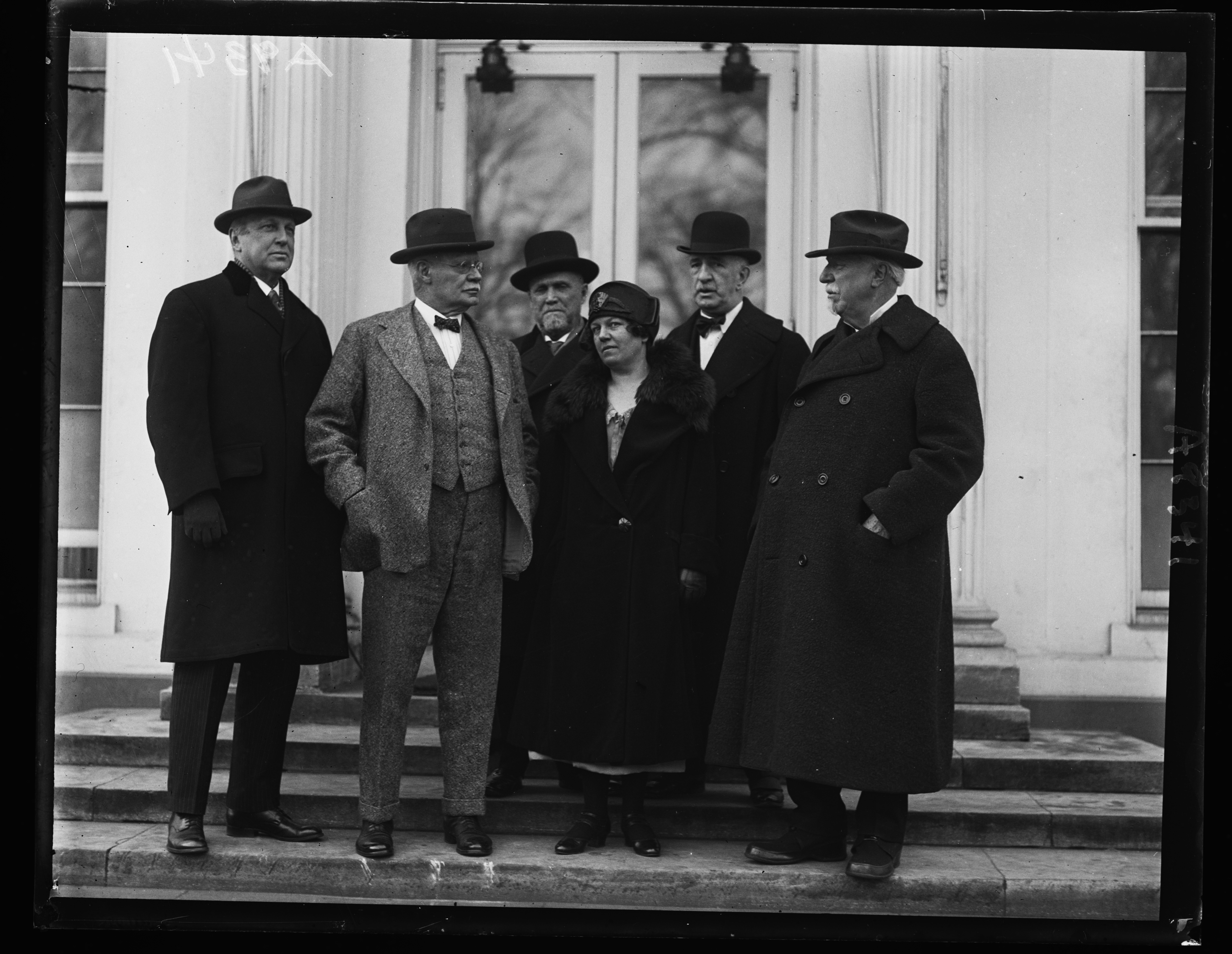
Members of the Board of Indian Commissioners, holding their 1925 annual meeting in Washington, make their report to President Coolidge and are photographed at the White House.

The Board of Indian Commissioners was a committee that advised the federal government of the United States on Native American policy and inspected supplies delivered to Indian agencies to ensure the fulfillment of government treaty obligations.

== History ==
In 1862, in response to the recent Dakota Uprising, Henry Whipple, Episcopal Bishop of Minnesota, wrote "The Duty of Citizens Concerning the Indian Massacre." According to Scott W. Burg one of its "key tenets" was "the creation of an independent commission to oversee Indian affairs, a nonpartisan group made up of clergy and citizens empowered to initiate change and given the tools to investigate malfeasance" (38 Nooses, p. 212). At the time President Lincoln, with whom Whipple had communications over the matter, was in the throes of the Civil War and Whipple's "key tenant" would not be realized until President Grant's post-Civil War presidency.

The board, established by Congress on 10 April 1869, authorized the president to organize a board of not more than ten persons "to be selected by him from men eminent for their intelligence and philanthropy, to serve without pecuniary compensation." It remained an all-Protestant, male body until 1902, when President Theodore Roosevelt appointed two Roman Catholics to fill vacancies. The Board of Indian Commissioners established what an "Indian" was, and the rights that they were given, through the different laws and regulations for educating Indians that the board established. An Indian was determined based on their physical appearances. However, legally, it was difficult to determine what rights to give Indians, as according to the board, they weren't aliens or foreigners, however, they weren't citizens by birth. The board therefore determined how to go about treating Native Americans. The members of the board all held semi-official positions within the government, unlike other humanitarian boards. However, the amount of work that the board was able to accomplish was rather compromised, because Congress held the board responsible for funding, and didn't give sufficient powers to enforce either their fundings or recommendations.

== Grant's Indian peace policy ==
Beginning in 1869, and in concert with the board, President Ulysses S. Grant attempted to formulate a new humane policy towards Native American tribes that was free of political corruption. Known as the Peace Policy, it aimed to place Native Americans on reservations where, in collaboration with Christian Church organizations, the Office of Indian Affairs would provide Native Americans with moral and competent Indian agents, establish churches and schools, teach agriculture and civilized pursuits and provide high-quality supplies at reasonable prices.

In 1872, the implementation of the policy involved the allotting of Indian reservations to religious organizations as exclusive religious domains. Of the 73 agencies assigned, the Methodists received fourteen; the Orthodox Friends ten; the Presbyterians nine; the Episcopalians eight; the Roman Catholics seven; the Hicksite Friends six; the Baptists five; the Dutch Reformed five; the Congregationalists three; Christians two; Unitarians two; American Board of Commissioners for Foreign Missions one; and Lutherans one. In the same year, 1872, Presbyterian, Methodist, and Episcopal missions converted more than 600 Sioux, Chippewas, Nez Percés and other Native Americans to these religions. In order to join these Christian religions, the Native Americans were required to shave their hair, adopt civil clothing, and go to work for his living. In essence, the conversion of Native Americans to these Christian religions was an attempt at assimilating Native Americans to the white man's society. The distribution caused immediate dissatisfaction among many groups who claimed that they had been slighted or overlooked. The selection criteria were vague and some critics saw the Peace Policy as violating Native American freedom of religion. Among the Roman Catholics, this dissatisfaction led to the establishment of the Bureau of Catholic Indian Missions in 1874.

The Peace Policy remained in force until 1881, when the government heeded the protests of religious organizations whose missionaries had been removed from reservations on which they had not been assigned.

== The Board after 1900 ==
Although the Board of Indian Commissioners began to lose influence in 1900, the appointment of new members quickly revived it. The introduction of Warren K. Moorehead to the Board led to the Board becoming aware of diseases that existed on reservations, as Moorehead was dedicated to this. In 1922, Flora Warren Seymour became the first woman on the Board. The fight against diseases on reservations was continued by the board member Charles Burke in 1923, when he began a health drive. Although the Board of Indian Commissioners continued to accomplish its goals of fighting disease on reservations, assimilating Native Americans into popular society, and making citizenship available to Native Americans throughout the Progressive Era and well into the 1920s, the Board was terminated by John Collier in 1933, as there was no funding for the Board in the New Deal.
