= Oil Fields Short Line Railroad =

Former railroad line

Overview
- Locale: Oklahoma
- Dates of operation: 1916–1923

Technical
- Track gauge: 4 ft 8 1/2 in (1,435 mm)
- Length: 4.4 mi (7.1 km)

The Oil Fields Short Line Railroad had both a short route—about 4.4 miles between Clifford and Dilworth in Kay County, Oklahoma—and a short existence, being created in 1916 and abandoned at the end of 1923.

== History ==
Dilworth was one of the many oil boomtowns created in Kay County, Oklahoma during the early part of the 20th Century. To service the surrounding oil field and a projected cement plant, the Oil Fields Short Line Railroad Company was incorporated May 29, 1916. Late in the same year, it completed its route starting at a point on the line of the St. Louis-San Francisco Railway (Frisco) called Clifford, and using rails leased from the Frisco ran west about 4.4 miles to Dilworth. It also utilized a steam locomotive and a passenger car leased from the Frisco.

However, the cement plant never materialized, and the oil field declined. Starting about mid-1922, the railroad quit running by steam and began operating using a motor car. Still losing money, the railroad filed for abandonment of its line on August 21, 1923. By a decision of the Oklahoma Corporation Commission dated December 18, 1923, its last day of operation was December 31, 1923, the abandonment being effective January 1, 1924. The rails were removed in July 1924.

There is a postscript. On October 30, 1931, the ICC ordered the railroad to repay certain excess net railway operating income found to have been received by the line for the period September 1, 1920 to December 31, 1920, in the amount of $2,497.64. Luckily for the railroad, the recapture order was vacated as a result of the repeal of the recapture provisions of the 1920 Transportation Act in mid-1933.
