= William Stoess =

American conductor and composer (1902–1953)

William Charles Stoess (1902 – 1953) was an American music arranger, musician, conductor and composer.

== Early life ==
He was the son of Mr. and Mrs. William M. Stoess of Cincinnati, Ohio.

== Career ==
Stoess was a violin soloist and an announcer on WLW radio in Cincinnati, Ohio. He began conducting a small ensemble there as early as 1921. In 1923, he became that station's first full-time music director, and he held that position for both WLW and WSAI (also in Cincinnati) from 1928 to 1937. Under Stoess's direction and station owner Powel Crosley Jr.'s leadership the music program grew to over 100 staff members by 1932 and was broadcast throughout the United States, earning WLW the nickname "The Nation's Station".

Stoess is credited with the early development of the soundtrack for the radio dramas produced at WLW.^{[2]} These dramas were nicknamed "soap operas" in reference to WLW's close relationship with sponsors Procter and Gamble.

While he was at WLW, Stoess directed Vocal Varieties, which originated at WLW and was broadcast on NBC-Red.

Stoess left WLW in July 1944 to work for Trans-American Broadcasting & Television Corporation in New York. Later, he went to the American Broadcasting Company, where he was responsible for the music of the religious drama The Greatest Story Ever Told.

== Personal life ==
On July 17, 1925, Stoess married Rosemary Ellerbrock, a pianist and organist who performed as both soloist and accompanist at WLW. The two met when they were students at College of Music of Cincinnati.

== Death ==
On September 24, 1953, Stoess died at Forest Hills, Long Island, New York. He was survived by his wife, a daughter, and his parents.
