= Pietro Floridia =

Italian composer

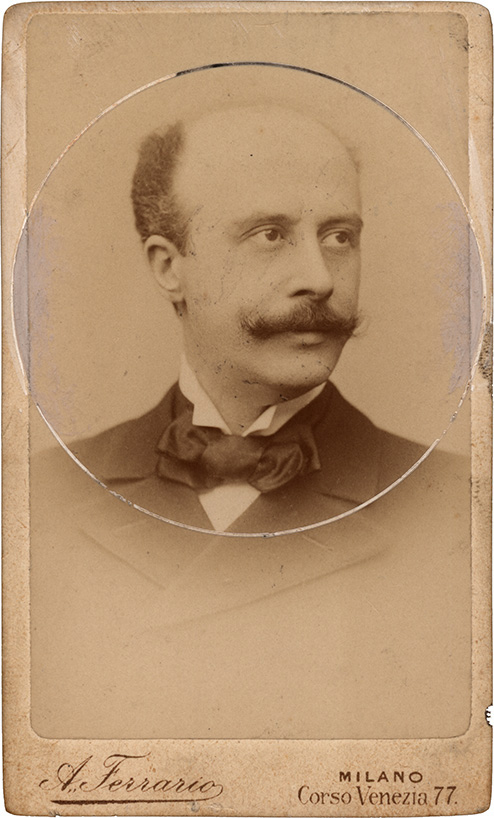
Pietro Floridia

Pietro Floridia (5 May 1860 in Modica – 16 August 1932 in New York City) was an Italian composer of classical music.

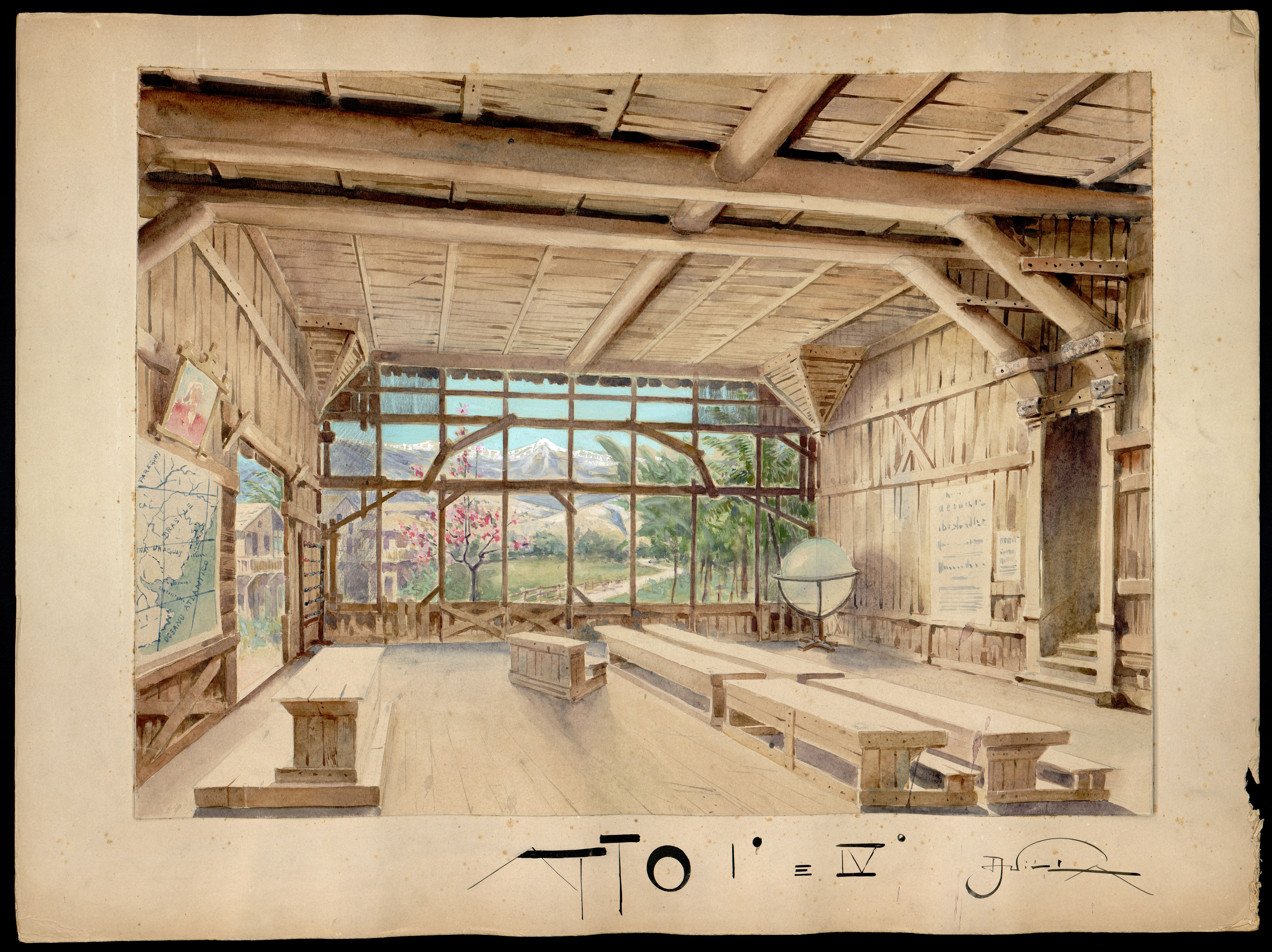
La scuola (la Casa del Comune), set design for La colonia libera act 1, 4 (1899).

According to David Johnson (quoting the notes, by Luigi della Croce, to the Bongiovanni recording of Floridia's Symphony and other works), Floridia was born in Modica, Sicily, and studied in Naples, where he created his first opera, Carlotta Clepier. He later destroyed the score of this work and entered further studies. He wrote a symphony (his only one) in 1888, taught at the Palermo Conservatory of Music, and wrote operas Maruzza (produced in Venice in 1894) and La Colonia Libera with libretto by Luigi Illica (produced in Rome in 1899).

Floridia moved to the United States in 1904. From this point he made a living by teaching at the Cincinnati College of Music for some years, and then moved to New York City. During this period Floridia wrote and produced several more operas - Paoletta, written for the Cincinnati Industrial Exposition (1910), The Scarlet Letter at some time during the 1900s, and (written but unproduced) his last opera, Malia. He also wrote incidental music, including to Oscar Wilde's A Florentine Tragedy; his music to this got a hearing in New York in 1917.

In 1914 while in New York City, he headed the Italian Symphony Orchestra.

Floridia died in Harkness Presbyterian Hospital in New York City in 1932.

== Sources ==
- Johnson, David (July–August 1995). "Review of Bongiovanni GB 5044-2: Floridia: Maruzza: Interlude. Ouverture Festiva. Serenade for Strings, op. 1. Symphony in D Minor". Fanfare Magazine. 18 (6): 185–6.
