= Reuben R. Springer =

American businessman and philanthropist (1800–1884)

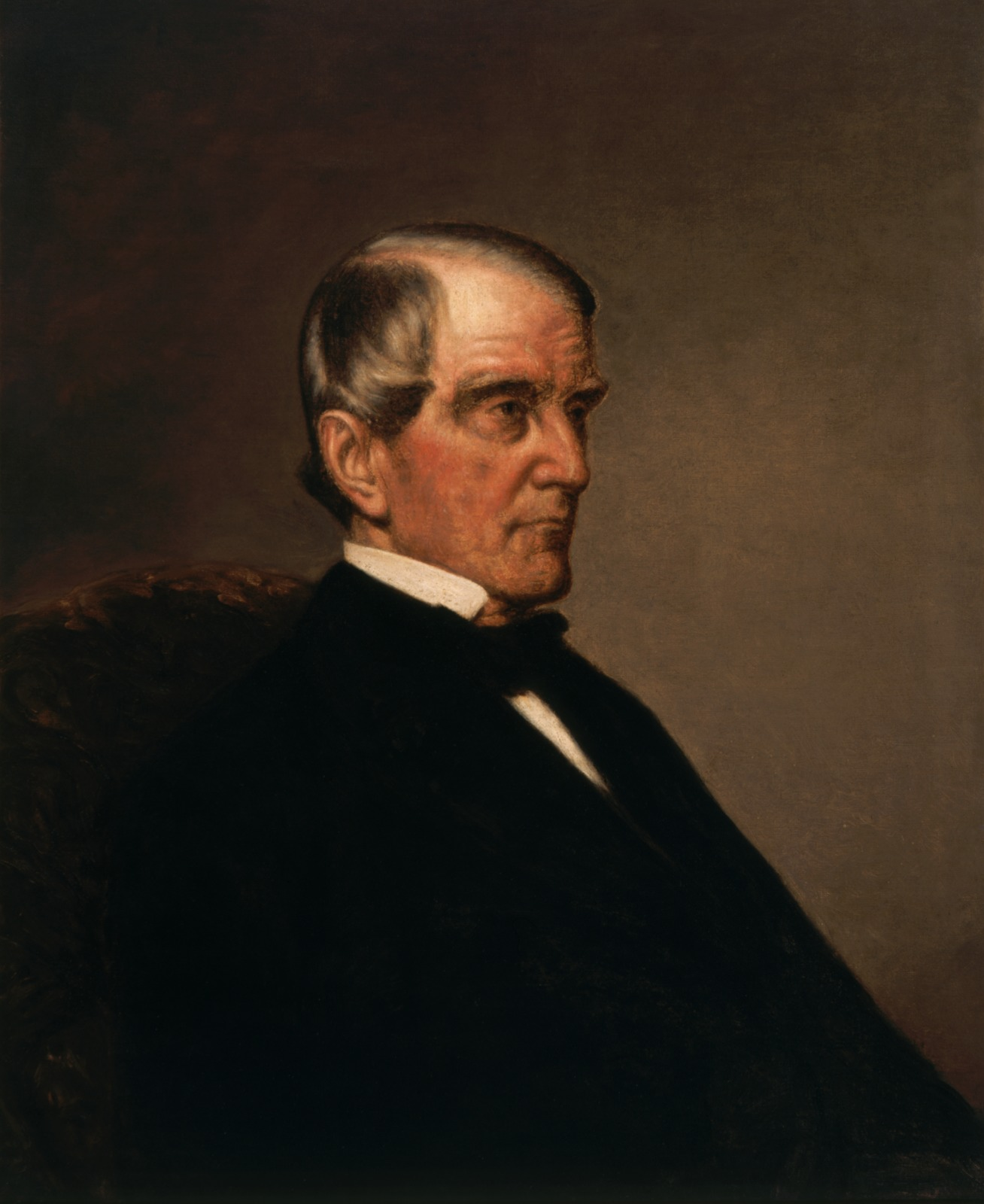
Portrait of Reuben R. Springer by Thomas Satterwhite Noble. In the collection of the Cincinnati Art Museum

Reuben Runyan Springer (November 16, 1800 – December 10, 1884) was an American businessman and philanthropist in Cincinnati, Ohio. He was a major contributor to the construction of the city's Music Hall, a major musical venue, where a life-size marble statue of him by Preston Powers can be seen.

== Life ==
Springer was born into a large family in Frankfort, Kentucky on November 16, 1800. He was the son of the local postmaster, originally from Virginia and a veteran of the American Revolution, who had fought under Mad Anthony Wayne, and his mother, who was a native of New Jersey. At age 13 he left school to become a clerk at the local post office, under his father's supervision. In time, he succeeded his father as postmaster, but found himself disenchanted by the work. Drawn to life on the Ohio River, he got a position with the firm of Taylor, Kilgour & Company, who were wholesale grocers, as a store clerk on one of their steamboats, the George Madison, which transported food between Louisville and New Orleans. In 1826, he obtained a transfer to a better position on another of the company's boats, the George Washington.

In 1830, Springer married Jane Kilgour, the daughter of one of the firm's founders, and became a partner in the company. Within ten years, he had worked so hard that he had become very wealthy, not only in the grocery trade, but also through investments in real estate and the railroads. However, he had destroyed his health in the process.

Living in semi-retirement the rest of his life, Springer would travel frequently to Europe, where he acquired a major art collection. He also became a patron of the arts, contributing hugely to the construction of the Cincinnati Music Hall, which was built largely through his own initiative. He also was a major contributor to the formation of the College of Music of Cincinnati.

He became a convert to Catholicism, and also contributed heavily to the Catholic Saint Peter in Chains Cathedral, located near his home. After his death, his bequest enabled the building of St. Francis Hospital for the indigent and children, which was also the only hospital west of the Alleghenies with facilities to treat cancer.

Springer died childless in 1884 at his home, located at the northeast corner of Seventh and Plum Streets in Cincinnati.

== See also ==
- Springer School and Center
