= Wilson G. Smith =

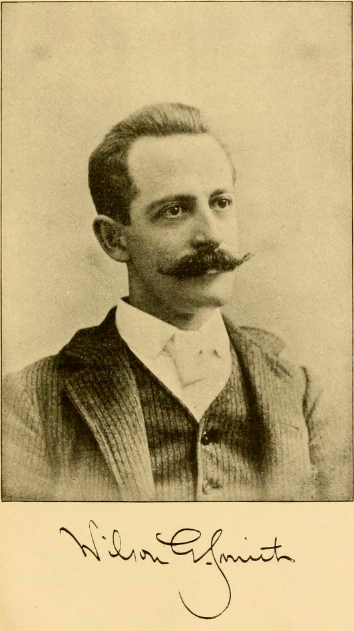
Wilson G. Smith

Wilson G. Smith (19 August 1855 (Note: The 1929 edition of Jahrbuch der Musikbibliothek Peters suggests that he was born in 1855 based on his age, not 1856 according to late 20th century sources.), Elyria – 26 February 1929, Cleveland) was an American composer and writer. Smith's full name was Wilson George Smith. He was a student of Otto Singer, as well as a student of Moritz Moszkowski, Oskar Raif, and Xavier Scharwenka during his time in Berlin. One of his major works is Homage to Edward Grieg.
