= Hiram Powers Dilworth =

American poet (1878–1975)

- Born: May 19, 1878; Hicksville, Ohio, US
- Died: November 26, 1975 (aged 97); Chicago, Illinois, US
- Education: Antioch College; College of Music of Cincinnati
- Occupation: Security guard
- Employer: Art Institute of Chicago
- Known for: Poet

Hiram Powers Dilworth (May 19, 1878 – November 26, 1975) was an American poet, pianist, and music teacher. He was the director of music at Nebraska Normal College and was also a guard at the Art Institute of Chicago for more than fifty years.

== Early life ==
Dilworth was born on May 19, 1878, in Hicksville, Ohio. He was named for the Vermont sculptor, Hiram Powers. His father was William Dillsworth, a successful merchant in Hicksville. His brother, Homer, was a county superintendent in Angola, Indiana , in 1907.

He attended Antioch College, graduating in 1900. He then attended and graduated from the College of Music of Cincinnati, where he studied with Albino Gorno. He continued his musical studies in New York City and Paris.

== Career ==
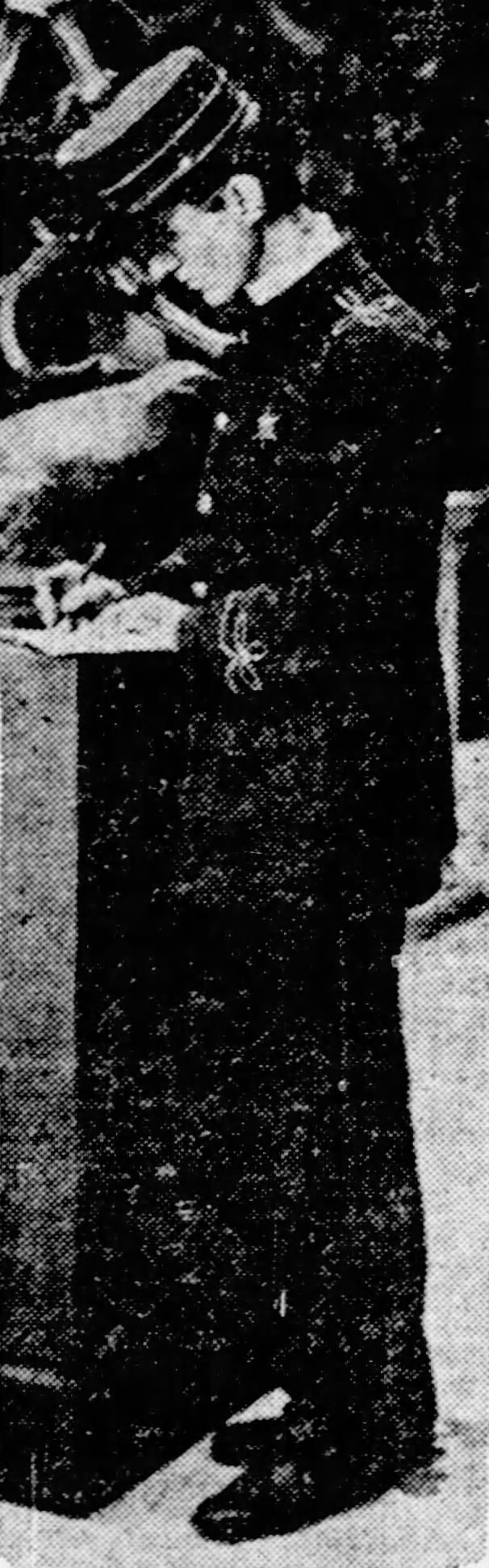
Dilworth writing poetry in his guard uniform at the Art Institute of Chicago, 1909.

Dilworth started his career as a well-known classical pianist. After graduating from the College of Music, Dilworth became a professor and the music director at the Nebraska Normal College from 1902 to 1904.

He moved to Chicago in 1904, where he performed concerts, taught music lessons, and was active in the music scene. He became a guard at the Art Institute of Chicago on October 2, 1904. He worked at the Art Institute until his retirement in 1959. This job allowed Dilworth to focus on writing poetry, as he "disdained the idea of being a poet-for-profit". He often wrote poetry on the back of the Art Institute's weekly bulletins while at work.

His poems were published in Chicago's Poetry: A Magazine of Verse. He also self-published more than twenty poetry books, including The Year (1908), Seven Sonnets and Ode to the Merry Moment (1916), Harry Butters: a Monody (1917), Songs of Autumn (1922), Ode on the Pure Art and the Great Achievement and the Enduring Name of Fannie Bloomfield-Zeisler (1928), and The Cup of Joy (1937).

Dilworth wrote poems in the sonnet form, many exceeding 100 stanzas. His poems were about music, nature, patriotism, religion, and memorials. His inspiration was often classic music, a musical performance, a painting at the Art Institute, or another musician. His epic patriotic poem "Harry Butters" is his most famous work; the poem was about a Dillworth's friend who died in France while fighting for the British during World War I.

Winston Churchill, David Lloyd George, and Jack London praised Dilworth's work. In 1952, he received the Grace Thayer Bradley Award for Poetry from the Friends of Literature.

== Personal life ==
Dilworth lived at 424 West 66th Street in Chicago. He did not marry.

During the 1920s, Dilworth dabbled in the stock market and became affluent, earning the nickname "the millionaire guard". That ended with the 1929 stock market crash. However, in 1954, he told the Chicago Tribune that he had recouped his fortune.

Dilworth died in Chicago on November 26, 1974.

== Selected publications ==
=== Books ===
- Rosemary. Chicago: Hiram Powers Dilworth, 1898.
- The Year: Twelve Sonnets. Chicago: Hiram Powers Dilworth, 1908.
- Ode to Prophesy. Chicago: Hiram Powers Dilworth, 1910.
- Ode to Morning. Chicago: Hiram Powers Dilworth, 1913.
- The Answer and Other Poems. Chicago: Stovel-Stephen Co. Printers, 1915.
- Seven Sonnets and Ode to the Merry Moment. Chicago: Hiram Powers Dilworth/Stovel-Stephen Co. Printers, 1916.
- Harry Butters: A Monody. Chicago: Hiram Powers Dilworth, 1917.
- Songs of Autumn. Chicago: Hiram Powers Dilworht, 1922.
- Memorial Poems to My Parents. Chicago: Saul Brothers/Hiram Powers Dilworth, 1927.
- Ode on the Pure Art and the Great Achievement and the Enduring Name of Fannie Bloomfield-Zeisler. Chicago: Saul Brothers/Hiram Powers Dilworth, 1928.
- The Cup of Joy. Chicago: Hiram Powers Dilworth, 1937.

=== Anthologies ===
"Greek Slave". in The Chicago Anthology: A Collection of Verse from the Work of Chicago Poets. Charles Granger Blanden and Minna Mathison, editors. Roadside Press, 1916 pp. 121–122 – via Google Books.
