= Hugh Brown (Queen's Park footballer) =

Scottish footballer

Personal information
- Full name: Hugh Brown
- Place of birth: Scotland
- Position: Right back

Senior career*
Years	Team	Apps	(Gls)
1915	Queen's Park	1	(0)
- * Club domestic league appearances and goals

Hugh Brown was a Scottish amateur footballer who made one appearance as a right back in the Scottish League for Queen's Park.

== Personal life ==
During the First World War, Brown served in the Lovat Scouts prior to being commissioned into the Royal Scots Fusiliers. While serving as a second lieutenant, he was admitted to hospital in France after suffering gunshot wounds on the Western Front in May 1917.

== Career statistics ==
Appearances and goals by club, season and competition
Club	Season	League			Scottish Cup		Total	
Club	Season	Division	Apps	Goals	Apps	Goals	Apps	Goals
Queen's Park	1914–15	Scottish First Division	1	0	—		1	0
Career total			1	0	—		1	0
