= Dora Henninges Heinsohn =

American opera singer

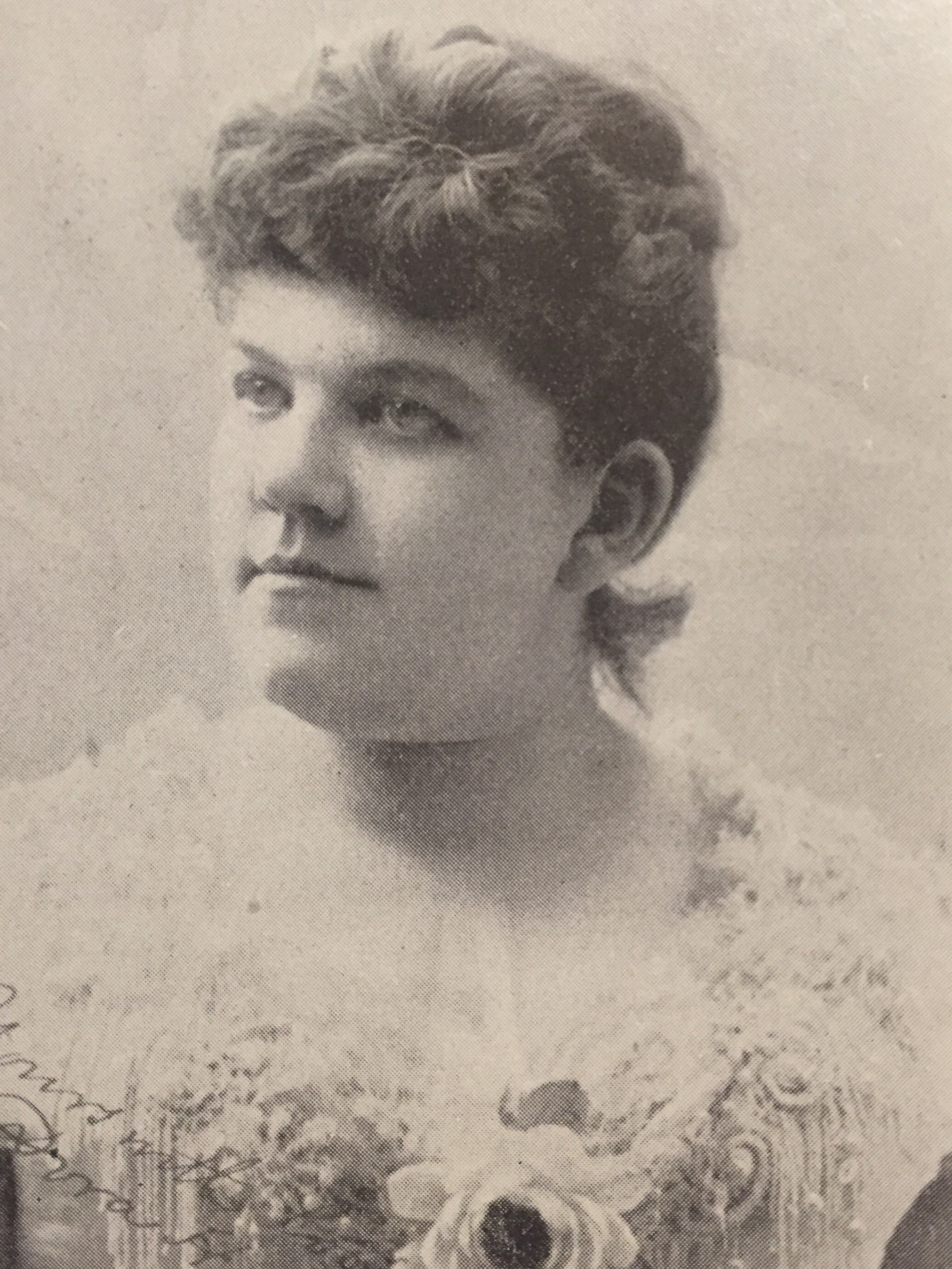
Dora Henninges Heinsohn

Dora Henninges Heinsohn (August 1861 – April 16, 1900) was an opera singer.

== Early life ==
Heinsohn was born in Mansfield, Ohio, in August 1861. She began her studies at seven years old, both vocal and instrumental, with her father, R. E. Henninges.

== Career ==
Heinsohn sang in concerts and operettas at fourteen, and soon entered the College of Music of Cincinnati, where she advanced to the highest position among vocal pupils, gaining attention of the faculty and music lovers. Her teachers were La Villa and Stefanone. Later, she became a pupil of Max Maretzek, under whose guidance she began to study Italian opera.

Her first appearance in opera, after having sung many times in oratorios and concerts under Theodore Thomas, was under James Henry Mapleson, when she appeared as Leonora in Beethoven's Fidelio. Soon after, she went to Paris, where she became a pupil of Mme. Lagrange, under whose direction she completed her studies. After her return to this country, Heinsohn appeared in German opera in the Metropolitan Opera House, New York, and in many concerts, both in the East and the West.

She had a dramatic soprano voice and her repertory was a large one, consisting of hundreds of songs and dozens of operatic roles.

== Personal life ==
On February 15, 1888, Heinsohn was married to George W. Heinsohn, of Cleveland, Ohio, and devoted her time to teaching, church and concert singing in St. Louis, Missouri. She died on April 16, 1900 at Huron Street Hospital in Cleveland. She is buried at Riverside Cemetery, Cleveland, Ohio.
