= Dilworth, Oklahoma =

Coordinates: 36°56′29″N 97°13′41″W

Dilworth was one of the many oil boomtowns created in Kay County, Oklahoma during the early part of the 20th Century. It was located about 10.5 miles northwest of Newkirk, the county seat, or about 14 miles by present-day roads. While it is now designated a Populated Place, it is considered a ghost town.

== History ==
Dilworth was founded about November 1916, in a booming oil field variously known as the Blackwell field or the Dilworth field. In that same year, the Oil Fields Short Line Railroad was completed into Dilworth from a connection point called Clifford off the St. Louis-San Francisco Railway. 1916 also saw Dilworth get its own weekly newspaper, the Dilworth New Era, which on its masthead called Dilworth “The City of the Flowing Gold,” and placed the town “in the Heart of the Oil Fields.” A Post Office opened in April 1917. A vote to incorporate as the Town of Dilworth passed in late October 1917, and the first town ordinances were promulgated in March 1918. The population of Dilworth climbed to several thousand. At one time it had a grain elevator, 4 or 5 business houses, 2 stores, a lumber yard, a Doctor's office, and a garage. A panorama photograph of Dilworth circa 1925 shows a substantial little town had been constructed.

However, the boom was short lived. By the end of 1923, the population was down to about 50, and the Oil Fields Short Line Railroad, by then losing money, abandoned the route into Dilworth. In March 1929, the Newkirk Herald-Journal reported Dilworth was on the verge of losing its Post Office, and that the town which was once the “oil capitol of the county” had dropped into the class of Kay County's ghost oil towns.
