= Hugh Brown (footballer, born 1921) =

Scottish footballer

Personal information
- Full name: Hugh Brown
- Date of birth: 7 December 1921
- Place of birth: Carmyle, Scotland
- Date of death: July 1994 (aged 72)
- Place of death: Surrey, England
- Position: Wing half

Senior career*
Years	Team	Apps	(Gls)
1946–1951	Partick Thistle	79	(12)
1951–1952	Torquay United	55	(0)

International career
1946–1947	Scotland	3	(0)
1947–1948	Scottish Football League XI	2	(0)
- * Club domestic league appearances and goals

Hugh Brown (7 December 1921 – July 1994) was a Scottish professional footballer, who played for Partick Thistle, Torquay United and Scotland.
