= Simon E. Jacobsohn =

Latvian-American violinist

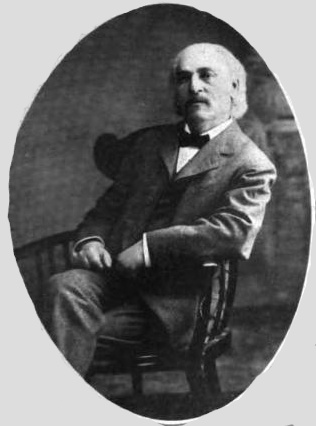
- Born: December 24, 1839; Mitau, Kurland, Russian Empire
- Died: October 2, 1902 (aged 62); Chicago, Illinois, United States
- Occupation: Violinist

Simon E. Jacobsohn (December 24, 1839 in Mitau, Kurland, Russian Empire – October 3, 1902 in Chicago, Illinois, United States) was a Latvian-American violinist.

Jacobsohn was born in Latvia to a Jewish family. He was educated in Leipzig under Ferdinand Davis. In 1872 he immigrated to the United States to become concertmeister and solo violinist in the orchestra which Theodore Thomas was at that time conducting in New York City. Before going to the US, Jacobsohn had been concertmeister at Bremen, at which time he organized a string quartet which became very famous throughout Europe. His musicianship in this capacity was so highly esteemed, that for fifteen or twenty years after he moved to the US, European musical critics made favorable comparison of the Jacobsohn quartet with later quartets.

After several years in New York, the Cincinnati College of Music (now the University of Cincinnati – College-Conservatory of Music) engaged Jacobsohn to direct their violin department. Jacobsohn developed an immense following, leading to the establishment of the Jacobsohn Violin School. Among his noted pupils while in Cincinnati were Max Bendix, Nahan Franko, Nicholas Longworth, Henry Burck, Michael Banner, Miss Currie-Duke, Theodore Binder, Carl Heinzen, Ollie Torbett, Madge Wickham, and Hugh McGibeny.

In the fall of 1887 Jacobsohn moved to Chicago, and many of his pupils went with him. There he established his Violin School and organized a string quartet. He also established the Chicago Orchestral Club, an organization for the benefit of amateurs only; and this orchestra of amateurs gave series of concerts, played important orchestral composition and from this source came the impetus which carried many of them into the professional field. Jacobsohn was instrumental in raising Chicago's profile as a musical center. Jacobsohn also toured the United States with pianist William H. Sherwood, his good friend. Many of the members of the Theodore Thomas Orchestra (Chicago), Boston Symphony Orchestra, New York Symphony Orchestra amid scores of private and conservatory teachers throughout the US were trained by Jacobsohn.

The Jacobsohn Quartet which was here established contained the famous names of Simon E. Jacobsohn, first violin; Theodore Thomas, second violin; Carl Baetens, M. Dr., viola, and Adolf Hartdegan, cello (afterwards Michael Brandt, cello). Jacobsohn and Thomas alternated in playing first and second violin. Jacobsohn considered Thomas one of the finest interpreters of Mozart in the world; and so, when Mozart was played, Thomas always played first violin.
