= Hugh Ned Brown =

American fundraising consultant (1919–2011)

- Born: July 18, 1919; Oakwood, Ohio
- Died: December 7, 2011 (aged 92); Grove City
- Education: Cedarville College
- Occupation: Fund raising consultant
- Spouse: Marcella Brown
- Children: David Brown
- Parent(s): Harold Brown (father); Elsie Brown (mother)

Hugh Ned Brown (July 18, 1919 – December 7, 2011) was a freelance fund-raising consultant.

== Biography ==
Hugh Ned Brown, born on July 18, 1919, graduated from Cedarville, Ohio High School in 1937 and received a B.S. in education from Cedarville College in 1941. He and his wife Marcella, also a school teacher, have one son, David.

Hugh Ned Brown taught in the Blanchester, Ohio, Public School District for one term, 1941-1942, before joining the Navy in 1942. He graduated from the Navy School of Music in 1943 and performed in the Navy Band. During that time, he was active in public relations and promoting both the unit bands and the Navy Band. In 1943, Mr. Brown did coursework at Catholic University of America and at American University.

For the years 1946-1952, Hugh Ned Brown worked in various executive-administrative institutional positions—the Navy School of Music, the Cincinnati College of Music and the University of Dayton. From 1952 to 1954 he worked for American City Bureau, a national fund-raising organization. After doing field campaigning for this top firm until 1954, Brown spent the rest of the decade doing freelance consulting work while studying extensively at the University of Dayton, Indiana University, Northwestern University, Xavier University and Wittenberg University. His coursework was eclectic and reflect his varied interest—music, journalism, hospital administration, economics, and education.

In 1960, Brown returned to teaching in the Kettering (Ohio) City School system, teaching high school social sciences. Brown continued working as a public relations consultant on weekends during the school year and handled most of the road and residence services throughout the summer. Major consulting projects undertaken by Brown include planning the 1971 and 1975 Convention for the Ohio Catholic Educator Association (OCEA), being editor for Hospital Accounting, the official newsletter of the American Association of Hospital Accountants from 1958-1965, and being affiliated with Ketchum, Inc., a top-ranked fund raising firm based in Pittsburgh.

Hugh Ned Brown, even after retirement, continued volunteering his knowledge and experience in fundraising to nonprofit organizations. His area of expertise lay within the hospital and education fields. He died on December 7, 2011, in Grove City, Florida.

== Published work ==
- Dow Chemical Company. Agricultural Products Department; Hugh N. Brown (1985). The Evolution of Agriculture. Midland, MI: Dow Chemical Co. OCLC 54817297.
- Dow Chemical Company. Agricultural Products Department; Hugh N. Brown (1986). The History of Farm Implements. Midland, MI: Dow Chemical Co. OCLC 54754323.
