= Josef Stránský =

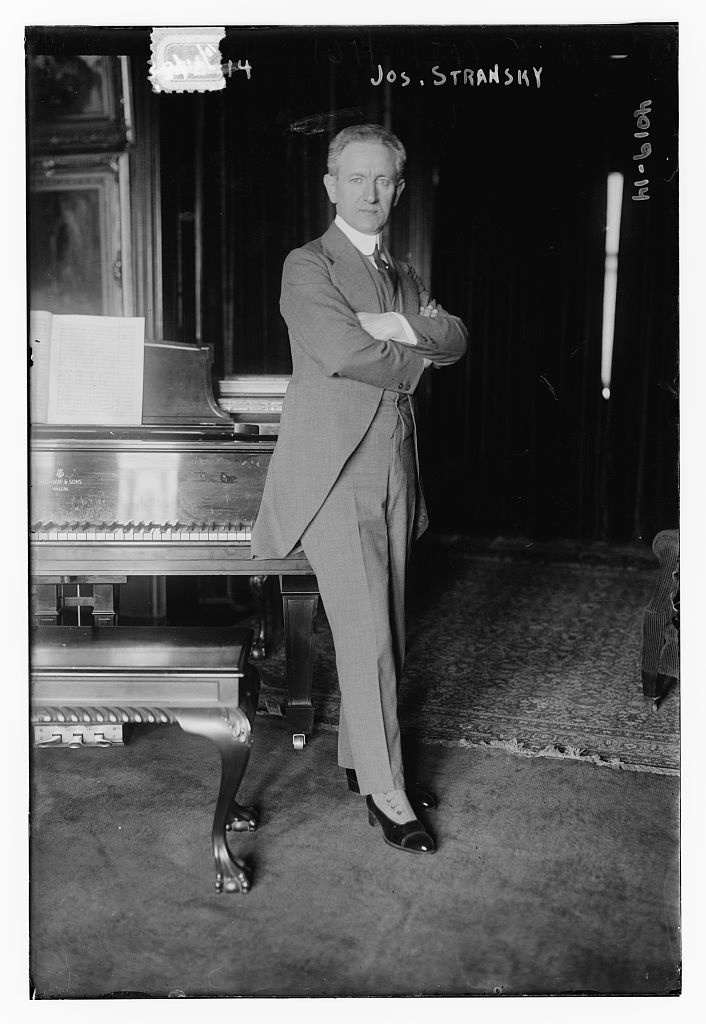
Stránský in 1916

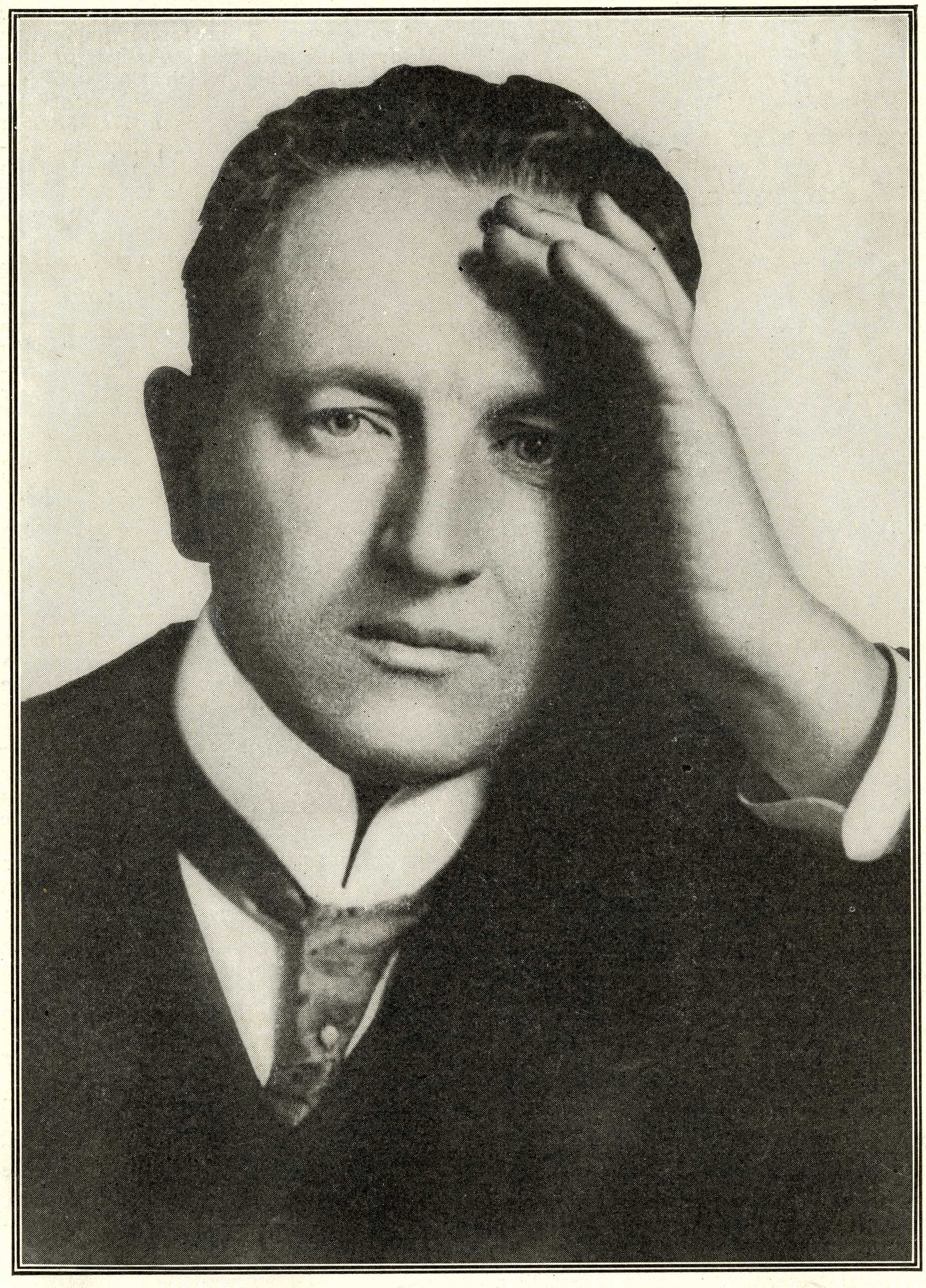
Stránský in 1911

Josef Stránský (September 9, 1872 – March 6, 1936) was a Czech conductor, composer, and art collector/dealer who moved to the United States and conducted the New York Philharmonic from 1911 to 1923.

== Biography ==
He was born on September 9, 1872, in Humpolec in Bohemia.

He worked as a conductor in Prague and Berlin before being selected by the New York Philharmonic to replace Gustav Mahler on Mahler's death in 1911. Some commentators did not see Stránský as a worthy successor to Mahler: the periodical Musical America wrote:

After much upheaval, search and negotiation, the New York Philharmonic Society ... has engaged Josef Stransky... Without disrespect to Mr. Stransky, there are reasons which cause this circumstance to remind one of Aesop's fable of the mountain in labor which finally brought forth a mouse

An article in The New York Times about the appointment began: "The financial backers of the New York Philharmonic Orchestra will be interested to learn that the German artistic world is filled with astonishment over the engagement of Josef Stransky of Berlin as the successor to the late Gustav Mahler", before going on to allege that Stránský was chosen over other candidates such as Oskar Fried and Bruno Walter because of his low financial demands.

Becoming the philharmonic's music director at age 39, Stránský was the youngest conductor to assume the post since Carl Bergmann over a half-century earlier. He married Marie Doxrud (1881–1954), a soprano from Norway, in 1912.

During his tenure with the philharmonic, Stránský received praise for his interpretations of Franz Liszt and Richard Strauss by the prominent critic Henry T. Finck of the New York Evening Post. However, Daniel Gregory Mason expressed his dissatisfaction with what he referred to as "the Wagnerian, Lisztian and Tschaikowskian pap ladled out to us by ... Stransky of the Phihamonic Society", and went as far as to call the conductor "a total musical incompetent". In an even more biting critique published in H. L. Mencken's American Mercury Magazine, critic D. W. Sinclair wrote

Succeeding one of the greatest figures in modern music, the late Gustav Mahler, Stransky maintained himself for so long, not so much by his musical abilities as by his social charm and personal cleverness.

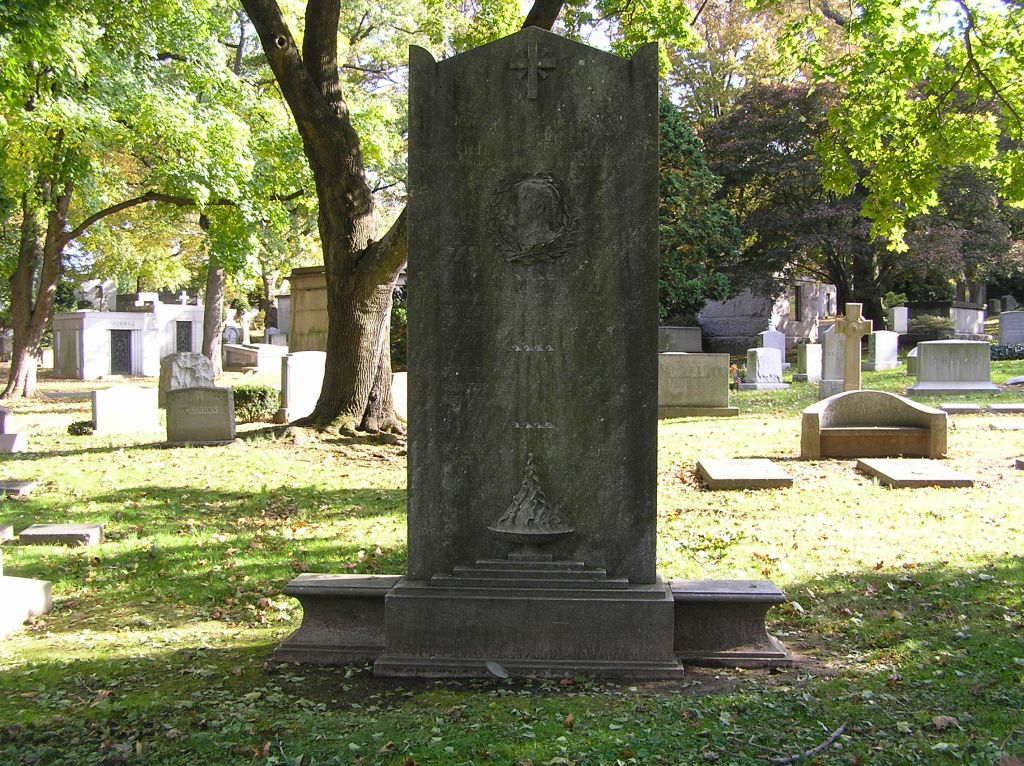
The headstone of Josef Stránský at Woodlawn Cemetery in the Bronx, New York

Mahler scholar Henry-Louis de La Grange has characterized Stránský as a "conscientious but uninspiring" leader, who allowed the high performing levels achieved by Mahler to fall.

Despite these criticisms leveled at him, in fact Stránský accomplished a great deal with the philharmonic. He had the widest repertoire of any of the philharmonic's previous conductors, and during the First World War, his programs shifted subtly to favor English, Russian, and French composers. Stránský also included more Americans than all of his predecessors combined, programming George Chadwick, Arthur Foote, Edward MacDowell, John Knowles Paine, and John Philip Sousa. Nor was Stránský averse to "contemporary" music: he played Respighi, Sibelius, and even his immediate philharmonic predecessor Mahler, and conducted the American premiere of Schoenberg's Pelleas und Melisande.

From his installation in 1911 until the end of the 1919–20 season, Stránský conducted every philharmonic concert. He conducted the orchestra's first recordings, which were made from January 1917 by the Columbia Graphophone Company, although the deal was only announced in March. He was elected an honorary member of Phi Mu Alpha Sinfonia fraternity, the national fraternity for men in music, in 1917 by the fraternity's Alpha chapter at the New England Conservatory of Music in Boston, Massachusetts. In 1921 the philharmonic merged with the National Symphony, conducted by Willem Mengelberg. For the 1922–23 season, Stránský conducted the first half of the season and Mengelberg the second: Stránský subsequently left the orchestra.

=== Art dealer ===
Stránský ultimately left the musical profession to become an art dealer, specializing in Picasso's Rose Period.

He was a partner in the art gallery E. Gimpel & Wildenstein in New York City. The gallery became Wildenstein & Company in 1933.

Before his death, Stránský amassed a private art collection that included more than 50 major impressionist and post-impressionist paintings by Picasso, Van Gogh, Gauguin, Renoir, Monet, Manet, Degas, Cézanne, Matisse, Seurat, Toulouse-Lautrec, Pissarro, Sisley, Delacroix, Ingres, Corot, Courbet, Daumier, Derain, Boudin, Modigliani, Segonzac, Fantin-Latour, Vuillard, Utrillo, Vlaminck, Guys, Laurencin, Rouault, Gromaire, and others. He also owned a large collection of old master paintings, and was a recognized authority on the old masters.

Had this group of works remained intact and in private hands, today it would be one of the most valuable privately held art collections in the world. Recently, Stránský was discovered to have owned for many years a 1785 painting by Nicolas Benjamin Delapierre that may be the earliest known portrait of Thomas Jefferson. It was sold by the estate of his widow (Marie D. Stransky) in October 1954.

Stránský died in New York City on March 6, 1936, and is buried at Woodlawn Cemetery in the Bronx, New York City.

== Bibliography ==
- Horowitz, Joseph. Classical Music in America. A History of Its Rise and Fall, W.W. Norton and Company, New York 2005, ISBN 0-393-05717-8
- Lyman, Darryl. Great Jews in Music, J. D. Publishers, Middle Viollage, N.Y. 1986.
- Sadie, Stanley. The New Grove Dictionary of Music and Musicians. Macmillan, London 1980.
- Sendrey, Alfred. Bibliography of Jewish Music, Columbia University Press, New York 1951.
