= Booing =

Form of criticism

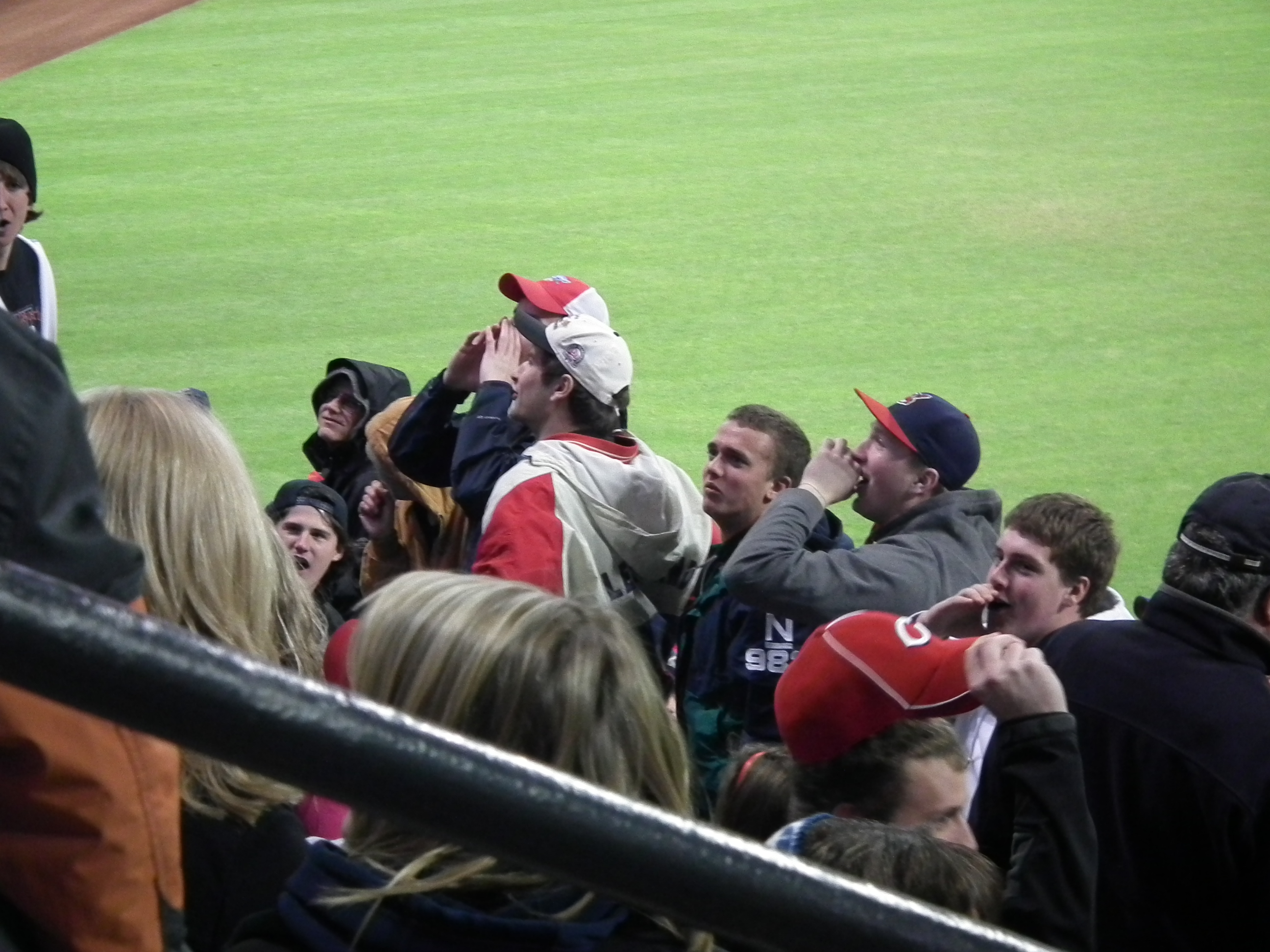
Fans of the Cleveland Indians baseball team booing fans of the Detroit Tigers

Booing is an act of publicly showing displeasure for someone or something, such as an entertainer or an athlete, by loudly yelling "Boo!" and sustaining the "oo" sound by holding it out. It may be accompanied by hand gestures such as the thumbs down sign.

Players booed for their performance reported that booing "spooked" or "bothered" them or their teammates to the point that it "affected their performance". Nick Swisher stated "It hurts. Sometimes I'm a sensitive guy and some of the things people say, they get under your skin a little bit." Ledley King stated, "It just frustrates me when the crowd boo England, who is that going to help? It just heaps more pressure on the players and gives us even less of a chance of scoring". However, the counterargument goes that the combination of booing and applause help keep the quality of public performance high, by emotionally rewarding the good and punishing the bad.

Booing is not always a judgement of performance, but can be an expression of disapproval of a third party.

== Sports ==
In sports, booing by fans is quite common. They may boo particularly-hated players on the opposing team (such as when they leave their original team to individually sign with another team in free agency, or get traded to said team and sign for a significant amount of money), or any opposing player when there is an intense rivalry between the teams. Unsportsmanlike behavior is also booed, such as intentionally hitting home team batters in baseball or diving in association football or basketball (where it is a technical foul). Booing of referees or umpires after an unpopular ruling is also common. Booing of expelled players after receiving a second yellow card or a direct red card is also common for many reasons. In professional sports, one's own home team, players or coach may be booed due to a poor performance or season.

National Hockey League commissioner Gary Bettman has been booed by fans, notably at the NHL entry draft and the Stanley Cup ceremony. The Canadian Broadcasting Company reported that the booing of Bettman "has become tradition" and that it was "no longer clear why fans boo him in pretty much every market." NHL players and NFL players have been booed by fans of their former teams after signing to other teams.

During professional wrestling matches, all heels traditionally receive boos from the audience as the villain. The ability to infuriate audiences and draw "heat" (negative reactions such as boos and jeers) is considered an essential skill for all heel performers.

== Politics ==
In the Parliament of the United Kingdom, booing is officially not permitted; Erskine May states: "Members must not disturb a Member who is speaking by hissing, chanting, clapping, booing, exclamations or other interruption." Nevertheless, jeering and heckling are somewhat common during Prime Minister's Questions.

== The arts ==
Although rare in the performing arts, opera remains one of the arts where booing remains, if not common, customary as merited. Rarer still is for motion pictures to be booed at their openings, and this is usually confined to film festivals when the production team is present.

Many composers had their works booed at their premiere performances. Stravinsky's Le Sacre du Printemps was met with boos at its 1913 Paris premiere. In 1899, Gustav Mahler's orchestral transcription of Beethoven's opus 95 string quartet was met with so much booing that Mahler reportedly sent two orchestra members into the audience to eject the most vociferous booers. A 1964 performance of John Cage's Atlas eclipitcalis by the New York Philharmonic under Leonard Bernstein was met with boos, a recording of which exists.

In traditional British pantomime, the audience is generally encouraged to direct boos and possibly other forms of put-downs towards the antagonist(s), while the protagonist and other positive characters are celebrated.

== See also ==
- Audience participation
- Heckler
- Whistling in sports
- New York Philharmonic concert of April 6, 1962
- List of classical music with an unruly audience response
