= New York Philharmonic concert of April 6, 1962 =

Controversial performance by Glenn Gould

The New York Philharmonic concert of April 6, 1962, is widely regarded as one of the most controversial in the orchestra's history. Featuring a performance by Glenn Gould of the First Piano Concerto of Johannes Brahms, conducted by its music director, Leonard Bernstein, the concert became famous because of Bernstein's remarks from the podium prior to the concerto. Before Gould performed, Bernstein disassociated himself from the interpretation that was to come, describing it as "unorthodox." Gould, for his part, claimed publicly to be in favor of Bernstein's remarks.

== Background ==
The concert was planned as a regular subscription concert towards the end of the orchestra's 71st season – its last at Carnegie Hall – and was not expected to cause any great stir. But several days before beginning rehearsals, Gould called Bernstein regarding some discoveries he had made while studying the score. The conductor was curious, later writing:

Any discovery of Glenn's was welcomed by me because I worshiped the way he played: I admired his intellectual approach, his "guts" approach, his complete dedication to whatever he was doing.

Nevertheless, the novelty of Gould's ideas needed to be shared carefully with the orchestra, and later with the public. The issue at hand was that Gould chose to take three very slow tempi in playing the three movements. Bernstein, in urging the musicians not to give up, referred to Gould as a "great man" and held that his ideas should be taken seriously.

Gould was averse to the "drama" that he found inseparable from the Romantic concerto tradition, in which he viewed the soloist as in competition with the orchestra. He wanted to subordinate and thereby "integrate" the soloist's role. He said that there were two ways to perform a concerto like the Brahms:

One can stress its drama, its contrasts, its angularities, and can treat the opposition of thematic tonal relations as a coalition of inequalities. This is the fashionable way to interpret romantic music these days. This way reads into it a plot full of surprises, a moral position full of contradictions. It approaches the perfunctory conventions of the classical sonata structure and its inherent and largely stereotyped plan with a naiveté which accepts the masculine–feminine contrast of theme as an end in itself. Alternatively, one can read the future into Brahms. One can see it as Schoenberg would have seen it: a sophisticated interweaving of a fundamental motivic strand; one can read into it the analytical standpoints of our own day.

And this, essentially, is what I have done. I have valued this structure for its similarities; I have chosen to minimize its contrasts.

== The concert ==
The pre-intermission part of the concert program consisted of two works by Carl Nielsen, the overture to his opera Maskarade, conducted by assistant John Canarina, and his Fifth Symphony. This went smoothly, but the second half of the concert was less sure. Even Gould's performance was not guaranteed, as he regularly canceled at the last minute. Consequently, the orchestra was ready with another work of Brahms, his First Symphony, which was to be performed on the Saturday concert of the subscription series in place of the concerto. Canarina later remembered seeing Harold Gomberg, principal oboe of the orchestra, standing by backstage to see if he would be needed for the symphony. Only when the concerto, for which he was not required, actually began did he leave the hall. In the event, Gould did perform, choosing to work from the orchestral score, which had been affixed to large pieces of cardboard on the piano.

Given the unusual nature of Gould's conception of the piece, Bernstein determined that he would make a few remarks from the podium to better prepare the audience for the performance to come. He did this at the Thursday concert, widely seen as a "preview" of the rest of the run, to which critics did not come; however, he repeated his speech at the Friday concert, which was usually the one chosen for review.

Bernstein's spoke for more than three minutes from the podium:

Don't be frightened. Mr. Gould is here. [laughter] He will appear in a moment. I'm not, um, as you know, in the habit of speaking on any concert except the Thursday night previews, but a curious situation has arisen, which merits, I think, a word or two. You are about to hear a rather, shall we say, unorthodox performance of the Brahms D Minor Concerto, a performance distinctly different from any I've ever heard, or even dreamt of for that matter, in its remarkably broad tempi and its frequent departures from Brahms' dynamic indications.

I cannot say I am in total agreement with Mr. Gould's conception and this raises the interesting question: "What am I doing conducting it?" [laughter] I'm conducting it because Mr. Gould is so valid and serious an artist that I must take seriously anything he conceives in good faith and his conception is interesting enough so that I feel you should hear it, too.

But the age-old question still remains: "In a concerto, who is the boss; the soloist or the conductor?" [much laughter] The answer is, of course, sometimes one, sometimes the other, depending on the people involved. But almost always, the two manage to get together by persuasion or charm or even threats [laughter] to achieve a unified performance.

I have only once before in my life had to submit to a soloist's wholly new and incompatible concept and that was the last time I accompanied Mr. Gould [much laughter].

But, but this time the discrepancies between our views are so great that I feel I must make this small disclaimer. Then why, to repeat the question, am I conducting it? Why do I not make a minor scandal – get a substitute soloist, or let an assistant conduct it? Because I am fascinated, glad to have the chance for a new look at this much-played work. Because, what's more, there are moments in Mr. Gould's performance that emerge with astonishing freshness and conviction. Thirdly, because we can all learn something from this extraordinary artist, who is a thinking performer, and finally because there is in music what Dimitri Mitropoulos used to call "the sportive element", that factor of curiosity, adventure, experiment, and I can assure you that it has been an adventure this week collaborating with Mr. Gould on this Brahms concerto and it's in this spirit of adventure that we now present it to you [applause].

Bernstein's "Don't be frightened, Mr. Gould is here" refers to Gould's tendency to cancel performances.

== Controversy ==
=== Bernstein's remarks ===
Bernstein's remarks occasioned much comment from nearly all the critics present. Some viewed his idea favorably, others less so. Harold C. Schonberg, in particular, took great exception to Bernstein's decision, taking him severely to task in the next day's edition of The New York Times. Schonberg cast his review in the form of a letter to his friend "Ossip" (believed by some to be a version of pianist Ossip Gabrilowitsch) in which he decried numerous aspects of the performance, specifically the conductor's seeming attempt to throw blame onto the soloist:

You know what, Ossip? I think that even though the conductor made this big disclaimer, he should not be allowed to wiggle off the hook that easy. I mean, who engaged the Gould boy in the first place? Who is the musical director? Somebody has to be responsible.

He finished with a swipe at Gould's technique. Reviews were also printed in most New York City newspapers, and in some others around the world. In a later writing, Bernstein maintained that his comments were an explanation, not a disclaimer, and that he had pre-approval from Gould.

So I said to Glenn backstage, "You know, I have to talk to the people. How would it be if I warned them that it was going to be very slow, and prepare them for it? Because if they don't know, they really might leave. I'll just tell them that there is a disagreement about the tempi between us, but that because of the sportsmanship element in music I would like to go along with your tempo and try it." It wasn't to be a disclaimer; I was very much interested in the results—particularly the audience reaction to it. I wrote down a couple of notes on the back of an envelope and showed them to Glenn: "Is this okay?" And he said, "Oh, it's wonderful, what a great idea."

=== Gould's performance ===
Gould's performance, too, came in for a great deal of criticism. Clocking in at just over 53 minutes long, it was seen at the time to be far too slow. Gould was also criticized for taking excessive liberties with score markings. More recent research has, to a point, validated Gould's ideas, with Gould's chosen tempo being similar to previous performances of the piece. Bernstein's later recording of the concerto, with Krystian Zimerman, runs to 54 minutes (although the first movement, at 24:32 vs. 25:37, and third movement, at 13:00 vs. 13:34, are considerably shorter), and other recordings are of comparable length. Gould, for his part, is said to have thoroughly enjoyed the proceedings, especially the fact that he had provoked some booing from the audience; he held that some controversy was better than quiet complacence with the performance. He also allowed some leeway; before the Sunday afternoon concert, at Bernstein's request, he allowed the conductor more freedom with the orchestra, and as a consequence the speech was not given.

== Recording ==
Columbia Records had planned to release a recording of the concerto, as part of its agreement with the philharmonic and with Bernstein. Both he and Gould were on contract to the company; it had further been expected that he would record most of the orchestra's concert repertory for distribution. Nevertheless, after the controversy over Gould's performance, it was decided (by Schuyler Chapin, then director of the company) to shelve any plans for a commercial release. The concert had, however, been broadcast live, and bootleg pressings of the broadcast circulated for some years. As a result, it was decided to release the performance on Sony Classical; the disc is rounded out with Bernstein's remarks and with a radio interview with Gould from 1963.

Other recordings exist of Gould playing the same concerto at a more conventional tempo, one with the Canadian conductor Victor Feldbrill, and another with the Baltimore Symphony under Peter Herman Adler (October 9, 1962, once available on Music & Arts CD-297).

== Legacy ==
The performance is still regularly referred to by critics and features in retrospectives of Gould's career. Gould, speaking in 1982, was unrepentant:

Soloists and conductors disagree all the time. Why should this be hidden from the public, especially if both parties still give their all?

Musical humorist Peter Schickele, in The Definitive Biography of P.D.Q. Bach, referred to this concert in his entry for P.D.Q. Bach's Concerto for Piano vs. Orchestra; he then claimed that at the premiere of the P.D.Q. Bach concerto, the conductor, pianist, and concertmaster all turned to the audience, and in unison disassociated themselves with the piece itself.

A 2020 Swiss radio documentary re-enacted the controversy.
