= Piano Concerto No. 1 (Brahms) =

Piano concerto

- by Johannes Brahms
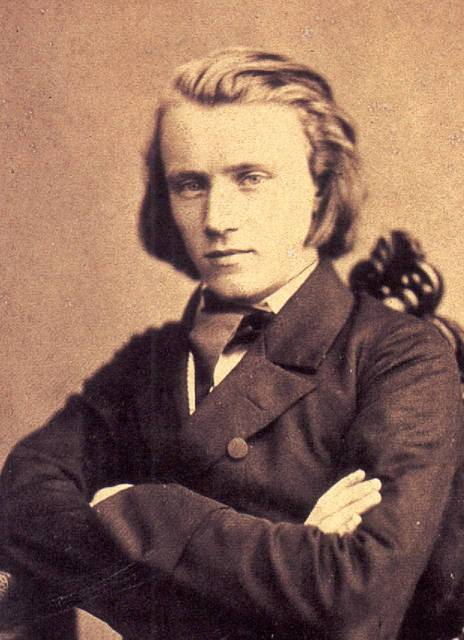
- The composer in 1853
- Key: D minor
- Opus: 15
- Composed: 1858
- Published: 1860
- Publisher: Breitkopf & Härtel
- Movements: 3
- Scoring: Solo piano and orchestra

Premiere
- Date: 22 January 1859
- Location: Hanover
- Conductor: Joseph Joachim
- Performers: Johannes Brahms, Hanover Court Orchestra

The Piano Concerto No. 1 in D minor, Op. 15, is a work for piano and orchestra completed by Johannes Brahms in 1858. The composer gave the work's public debut in Hanover, the following year. It was his first-performed orchestral work, and (in its third performance) his first orchestral work performed to audience approval.

== Form ==
External audio
- Performed by Krystian Zimerman with the Berlin Philharmonic under Simon Rattle
- I. Maestoso - Poco più moderato
- II. Adagio
- III. Rondo (Allegro non troppo)

This concerto is written in the traditional three movements and is approximately 40 to 50 minutes long.

1. Maestoso (D minor) (c. 20 minutes)
2. Adagio (D major) (c. 13 minutes)
3. Rondo: Allegro non troppo (D minor → D major) (c. 11 minutes)

The first movement is in sonata form, divided into five sections: orchestral introduction, exposition, development, recapitulation, and coda. This movement is large, lasting between 20 and 25 minutes. Although without a cadenza, the strict adherence to forms used in the Classical Period earned Brahms a reputation for being musically "conservative" despite his innovative harmonies and chord progressions. The theme heavily makes use of arpeggiated chords and trills. Within the orchestral introduction other themes are introduced, and the thematic material is further developed by both orchestra and soloist.

The second movement is in a ternary form, with the theme in the violins accompanied by bassoons.

The structure of the rondo finale is similar to that of the rondo of Beethoven's Piano Concerto No. 3. There are three themes present in this rondo; the second theme may be considered a strong variation of the first. The third theme is introduced in the episode but is never explicitly developed by the soloist, instead the soloist is "integrated into the orchestral effect". A cadenza follows the bulk of the rondo with an extensive coda that develops the first and third themes appearing afterward. The coda is in the parallel major, D major.

== Instrumentation ==
The piece is scored for 2 flutes, 2 oboes, 2 clarinets (B♭ and A), 2 bassoons, 4 horns (initially 2 in D, 2 in B♭ bass), 2 trumpets (D), timpani (D and A), piano, and strings.

== Overview ==
=== Roles of Joachim and Clara Schumann ===
Brahms was himself a professional-level pianist who had first highly impressed the leading violinist Joseph Joachim, who gave him a letter of introduction to Robert Schumann. Brahms and Joachim became close friends for life. In 1853 Brahms had aroused the greatest admiration from Robert and his wife Clara Schumann, a turning point in Brahms's career, by playing for them some of his own solo piano pieces. Clara was a leading concert pianist and a composer. She and Brahms began a lifelong friendship, which became more important when Robert was committed to an asylum in 1854 and then died in 1856. Clara, 14 years older than Brahms, wrote of him in her diary in 1854 "I love him like a son." Brahms's love of her (and her husband) was respectful, more complex and conflicted, but he much valued her opinions and advice.

=== Composition ===
During the course of its composition, the work evolved through several different forms, and was heavily and repeatedly edited by Brahms. In 1854, the year Robert Schumann was admitted to the asylum, it had begun its life as a sonata for two pianos. By July 27 of that year it was being transformed into a four-movement symphony. Brahms sought advice from his close friend Julius Otto Grimm. "Brahms was in the habit of showing his orchestrations to Grimm, who, with his conservatory training, was better schooled in orchestration." After incorporating some of Grimm's suggestions, Brahms sent the orchestrated first movement to Joachim. Evidently Joachim liked it. Brahms wrote to him on 12 September 1854 that: "As usual, you've viewed my symphony movement through rose-coloured spectacles – I definitely want to change and improve it; there's still a great deal lacking in the composition, and I don't even understand as much of the orchestration as appears in the movement, since the best of it I owe to Grimm." By January 1855 Brahms had composed second and third movements, for piano. He ultimately decided to make the work a concerto for piano, his favored instrument, in 1855–56, all the while consulting friends about its orchestration. Avins writes that: "In all the many volumes of correspondence to and from Brahms, nothing quite approaches the letters he and Joachim exchanged over his First Piano Concerto (there are more than twenty of them) ... Joachim's answers, lengthy, detailed, thoughtful, and skilled, are extraordinary testimonials to his own talent, and to the awe and admiration he felt for his friend." Brahms only retained the original material from the work's first movement; the remaining movements were discarded and two new ones were composed: a second movement adagio, which Brahms' biographer Hans Gál called "calm and dreamlike"; and a third movement rondo, in which Gál heard "healthy, exuberant creativity". The result was a work in the more usual three-movement concerto structure. As late as early February 1858, Joachim sent a manuscript back to Brahms "completely revised", hoping that he liked the reorchestrated sections.

=== Piano duo versions ===
Brahms also wrote a two-piano arrangement, which was essentially the original score before orchestration. In 1853 Robert Schumann had bought a grand piano for Clara so that the household had two. In September 1856 Brahms sent Clara the first movement of his new piano concerto in a two-piano score. She wrote in her diary on 1 October 1856 that Brahms had "composed an excellent first movement" for a piano concerto, and "I am delighted with its greatness of conception and the tenderness of its melodies." Then on 18 October, "Johannes has finished his concerto — we have played it several times on two pianos."

In 1862 Rieter-Biedermann, publisher of the Concerto, requested that Brahms write a piano four-hands arrangement. Publishers liked piano four-hands arrangements, which could be sold to customers owning only one piano. However, Brahms initially declined the request, saying it would not be "practical" for him; but two years later, for apparently mostly financial reasons, he made the arrangement.

=== Early performances ===
Clara heard a rehearsal of the concerto in Hanover in March 1858, nine months before the premiere there, and wrote to a friend that it "went very well ... Almost all of it sounds beautiful, some parts far more beautiful even than Johannes himself imagined or expected." The concerto was first performed on January 22, 1859, in Hanover, Germany, when Brahms was just 25 years old. The audience received it coldly. The second performance, five days later, was in Leipzig. The Leipzig Gewandhaus Orchestra was a leading one in Germany. It had premiered Beethoven's Piano Concerto No. 5 ("Emperor") in 1811. Felix Mendelssohn conducted the Gewandhaus from 1835 until his death in 1847. During his tenure the orchestra premiered Schubert's Symphony No. 9 ("Great Symphony"), after Schubert's death; Robert Schumann had unearthed a manuscript in Vienna and given a copy to Mendelssohn. The orchestra also premiered Mendelssohn's own Symphony No. 3 ("Scottish") and violin concerto. It seems that after Mendelssohn's death, "standards in Leipzig declined". Still, the Gewandhaus remained a highly prestigious orchestra. Its concertmaster, Ferdinand David, had invited Brahms to have his concerto performed there. Brahms, who served as piano soloist, had two rehearsals in Leipzig with the orchestra. He thought he had played the concerto "significantly better than in Hanover, the orchestra outstandingly," but at the end of the performance only a few in the audience tried to clap and were soon overwhelmed by hissing. The concerto had only one encouraging review, from the Neue Zeitschrift für Musik, Robert Schumann's former journal; it was "savaged" by other critics. Brahms wrote to Joachim "I am only experimenting and feeling my way," adding sadly, "all the same, the hissing was rather too much."

The third performance was 24 March 1859 in a concert with the Hamburg Philharmonic at which Joachim and the leading baritone Julius Stockhausen also performed. The concert was a great success. Each of the three leading performers was recalled for more applause. Brahms wrote to Clara that Joachim [as concertmaster?] "rehearsed my concerto and played it marvelously well ... In short, the Leipzig reviews have done no damage" [in Hamburg]. Heller wrote a "highly commendatory review".

Brahms revised the concerto (much less extensively than before) and in August 1859 sent the revised manuscript to Clara, who replied that she had "hours of joy" from it. In September she wrote that the adagio is "exquisite" and "beautiful". She said the first movement "gave me great pleasure" although she did not like "some things in it"l which she had criticized before, but Brahms had not changed them. The fourth performance of the concerto (and first of the new revision) was again with the Hamburg Philharmonic conducted by Georg Dietrich Otten and was not a success.

Another performance came two years later, on 3 December 1861, again with the Hamburg Philharmonic, this time with Brahms conducting and Clara as solo pianist. She wrote in her diary "I was certainly the happiest person in the whole room ... the joy of the work so overcame me", but "the public understood nothing and felt nothing, otherwise it must have shown proper respect." By this point, the concerto had been performed in concert five times, over three years, but had been a success with only one of the audiences. Brahms and Clara both put it aside for some years. At around this time, on 3 March 1860, Brahms did see the successful premiere in Hanover of his First Serenade. Given that his first symphony would not appear until 1876, the serenade was his second orchestral piece to be played in concert; thankfully, the lighter serenade's reception by the audience in Hanover was wildly better than that which the concerto had received at its Hanoverian premiere the year before.

=== Publication ===
In the summer of 1860 Brahms submitted to the publishers Breitkopf & Härtel five pieces: the concerto, his first serenade, two choral works, and "Eight Songs and Romances" (Op. 14). Only the serenade was accepted. The concerto was rejected based on its bad reception in Leipzig. No comment was made on the other three pieces. Brahms then submitted the four rejected pieces to a Swiss publisher, Melchior Rieter-Biedermann, who accepted them. Rieter-Biedermann later published many other Brahms pieces, including the German Requiem.

=== Later performances ===
In November 1865 Brahms performed the concerto in Karlsruhe successfully, being "recalled" for more applause. A group of "friends of music", some of whom had missed the concert, engaged the orchestra players and organized a "private concert" on Sunday morning at which Brahms's Piano Quartet No. 2 was also performed. Brahms wrote to Clara that "The musicians were exceedingly devoted to me, so that the whole affair was most agreeable."

The Viennese premiere of the concerto occurred on 22 January 1871 at the Wiener Musikverein, conducted by Felix Otto Dessoff.

In 1874 Clara played the solo part in a performance in a Gewandhaus concert in Leipzig, the first performance of the concerto there since the January 1859 débacle. Brahms himself was invited by a member of the Gewandhaus Board of Directors and performed the concerto in Leipzig 1 January 1878. The concerto "fared only slightly better this time" than it had in 1859.

Hans von Bülow was a concert pianist and highly regarded conductor. He wrote to Brahms in the spring of 1882 that "I am to participate in a Rhine Musical festival ... in Aachen ... I plan to play your D minor [concerto] well, or at least do my best ... with a few days of seclusion to prepare." Brahms replied "You ... can be proud of yourself ... to bring to a music festival such a work of ill repute as the D minor concerto." It was no secret that von Bülow admired Brahms, having called him "the third of the Three Bs". In 1881, Brahms finished his second piano concerto. Thereafter von Bülow took concert tours "with both Brahms's piano concertos, sometimes conducting from the keyboard."

=== Biographical points ===
Brahms's biographers often note that the first sketches for the dramatic opening movement followed quickly on the heels of the 1854 suicide attempt of the composer's dear friend and mentor, Robert Schumann, an event which caused great anguish for Brahms. He finally completed the concerto two years after Schumann's death in 1856.

The degree to which Brahms's personal experience is embedded in the concerto is hard to gauge since several other factors also influenced the musical expression of the piece. The epic mood links the work explicitly to the tradition of the Beethoven symphony that Brahms sought to emulate. The finale of the concerto, for example, is clearly modeled on the last movement of Beethoven's Piano Concerto No. 3, while the concerto's key of D minor is the same as both Beethoven's Symphony No. 9 and Mozart's dramatic Piano Concerto No. 20.

=== Symphonic and chamber techniques ===
The work reflects Brahms's effort to combine the piano with the orchestra as equal partners in a symphonic-scale structure, in emulation of the classical concertos of Mozart and Beethoven. It thus differs from earlier Romantic concertos, where the orchestra effectively accompanied the pianist. Even for the young Brahms, the concerto-as-showpiece had little appeal. Instead, he enlisted both orchestra and soloist in the service of the musical ideas; technically difficult passages in the concerto are never gratuitous, but extend and develop the thematic material. Such an approach is thoroughly in keeping with Brahms's artistic temperament, but also reflects the concerto's symphonic origins and ambitions. His effort drew on both chamber music techniques and the pre-classical Baroque concerto grosso, an approach that later was fully realized in Brahms's Piano Concerto No. 2. This first concerto also demonstrates Brahms's particular interest in scoring for the timpani and the horn, both of whose parts are difficult and prominent.

Although composed in Brahms's youth, this concerto is a mature work that points forward to his later concertos and his Symphony No. 1. Most notable are its scale and grandeur, as well as the thrilling technical difficulties it presents. As time passed, the work grew in popularity until it was recognized as a masterpiece. Brahms biographer Styra Avins calls it a "great" piece. Alfred Brendel considers it among the "purest Brahms", stating that to "...particularly the D-Minor Concerto, goes my love."

== Selected performances ==
- Wilhelm Backhaus with Sir Adrian Boult and the BBC Symphony Orchestra (November 28, 1932).
- Vladimir Horowitz with Arturo Toscanini and the New York Philharmonic (March 17, 1935).
- Artur Schnabel with George Szell and the London Philharmonic Orchestra (1938)
- Arthur Rubinstein with Fritz Reiner and the Chicago Symphony Orchestra (1954, RCA)
- Myra Hess with Dimitri Mitropoulos and the New York Philharmonic (1955)
- Leon Fleisher with George Szell and the Cleveland Orchestra (1958, Sony)
- Julius Katchen with Pierre Monteux and the London Symphony Orchestra (1959, Decca)
- Clifford Curzon with George Szell and the London Symphony Orchestra (1962, Decca)
- Glenn Gould with Leonard Bernstein and the New York Philharmonic (from a concert of April 6, 1962, famous for Bernstein's introductory remarks to the audience in which he said he was not in agreement with Gould's "remarkably broad tempi and ... frequent departures from Brahms' dynamic indications".
- Van Cliburn with Erich Leinsdorf and the Boston Symphony Orchestra (1964)
- Bruno Leonardo Gelber with Franz-Paul Decker and the Munich Philharmonic Orchestra (June 1965), winner of the Grand Prix Du Disque
- Rudolf Serkin with George Szell and the Cleveland Orchestra (1968, Sony)
- Claudio Arrau with Bernard Haitink and the Royal Concertgebouw Orchestra (1970)
- Emil Gilels with Eugen Jochum and the Berlin Philharmonic Orchestra (1972, Deutsche Grammophon)
- Arthur Rubinstein with Bernard Haitink and the Royal Concertgebouw Orchestra (1973, video)
- Alexis Weissenberg with Carlo Maria Giulini and the London Symphony Orchestra (1973, EMI Electrola)
- Radu Lupu with Edo de Waart and the London Symphony Orchestra (1975)
- Arthur Rubinstein with Zubin Mehta and the Israel Philharmonic Orchestra (1976)
- Roger Woodward with Kurt Masur and the New Philharmonic Orchestra (1976, RCA Red Seal)
- Maurizio Pollini with Claudio Abbado and the Berlin Philharmonic Orchestra (1977, Deutsche Grammophon)
- Vladimir Ashkenazy with Bernard Haitink and the Royal Concertgebouw Orchestra (1983)
- Emanuel Ax with James Levine and the Chicago Symphony Orchestra (1984)
- Stephen Kovacevich with Sir Colin Davis and the London Symphony Orchestra (1985)
- Krystian Zimerman with Leonard Bernstein and the Vienna Philharmonic Orchestra (1985, Deutsche Grammophon)
- Alfred Brendel with Claudio Abbado and the Berlin Philharmonic Orchestra (September 9, 1987, Philips)
- Horacio Gutierrez with André Previn and the Royal Philharmonic Orchestra (1991)
- Krystian Zimerman with Sir Simon Rattle and the Berlin Philharmonic Orchestra (2005, Deutsche Grammophon)
- Hélène Grimaud with Michael Gielen and the Southwest German Radio Symphony Orchestra (SWR Sinfonieorchester Baden-Baden und Freiburg) (April 17, 2005)
- Nelson Freire with Riccardo Chailly and the Gewandhausorchester (2006, Decca)
- Maurizio Pollini with Christian Thielemann and the Staatskapelle Dresden (October 14, 2011, Deutsche Grammophon)
- Hélène Grimaud with Andris Nelsons and the Symphonieorchester des Bayerischen Rundfunks (2013, Deutsche Grammophon)
- Daniel Barenboim with Gustavo Dudamel and the Staatskapelle Berlin (2015, Deutsche Grammophon)
- Paul Lewis with Daniel Harding and the Swedish Radio Symphony Orchestra (2016, Harmonia Mundi)
- Sunwook Kim with Myung-whun Chung and the Staatskapelle Dresden (2020, Accentus Music)

== Use in film ==
The first movement of the concerto was used to reinforce particularly dramatic moments in the British film The L-Shaped Room (1962), in a recording by Peter Katin.
