= Theodore Eisfeld =

German-American conductor and composer (1816–1882)

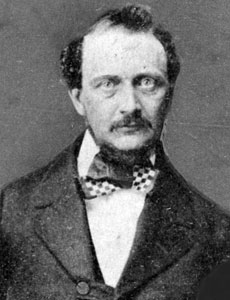
Theodore Eisfeld

Theodore Eisfeld (April 11, 1816, Wolfenbüttel, Duchy of Brunswick – 16 September 1882, Wiesbaden) was a conductor, most notably of the New York Philharmonic Society, which became the New York Philharmonic.

== Biography ==
Eisfeld's chief instructor in musical composition was Carl Gottlieb Reissiger, of Dresden. Between 1839 and 1843, he served as Kapellmeister of the Court Theatre at Wiesbaden. He came to New York in 1848, and in 1849 was the first man chosen by the New York Philharmonic Society to be sole conductor for an entire season (prior to this time it had been customary for several musicians to share the conducting duties). He began the custom of giving an annual Christmas performance of Handel's Messiah. He also introduced the first regular concerts of chamber music in New York.

From 1849 through the 1865/1866 season, when he resigned, Eisfeld often served as conductor of the New York Philharmonic Society. In this period it was customary for the conductor to change from season to season, sometimes with two men sharing the duties. On 18 February 1851, he began a series of quartet concerts, the first of which was given at Hope Chapel. Eisfeld was also the first conductor of the Brooklyn Philharmonic Society, which was founded in 1857. He continued in this position, alternating with Theodore Thomas between 1862 and 1865, before Thomas took over. This period also saw the composition of some brief works by Eisfeld.

On Eisfeld's return trip from a visit to Europe in September 1858, he was one of the few survivors of the burning of the steamship SS Austria where he was lashed to a platform and so drifted on the ocean, without food, for nearly two days and nights. He wrote a letter of gratitude to the d'Orey family in Faial for their care, published on Dwight's Journal of Music in 1859 on p.259 Eisfeld never recovered from this extraordinary prostration, returning to Germany in 1866, and remaining there until his death in Wiesbaden at 66.

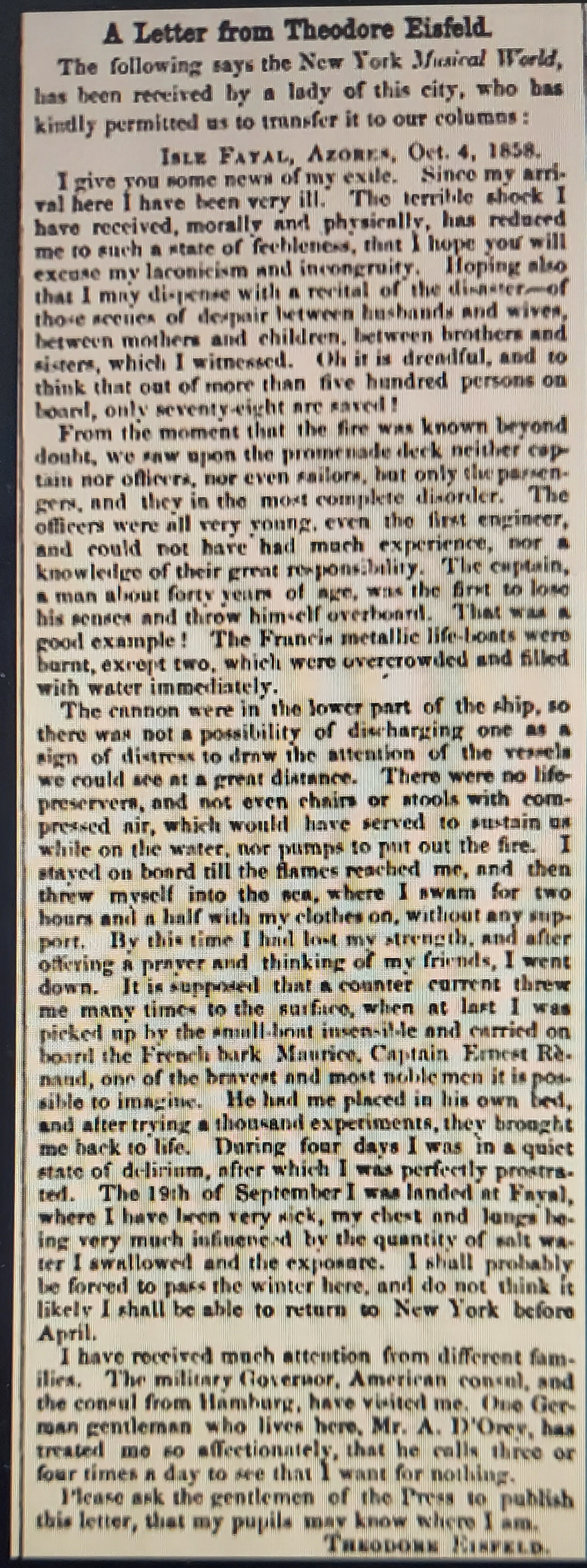
Letter describing Eisfeld's trauma and care in ear Faial, Azores after the SS Austria disaster

In his autobiography, Theodore Thomas described Eisfeld as follows:

Eisfeld belonged to the class of "time-beaters" and would make corrections in the harmonies of master-works he did not understand

== Conductors of the New York Philharmonic Society, 1849 - 1865 ==
- 1849-1854 Eisfeld
- 1854-1855 Eisfeld and Henry Timm
- 1855-1856 Carl Bergmann
- 1856-1858 Eisfeld
- 1858-1859 Bergmann
- 1859-1865 Bergmann and Eisfeld

== Bibliography ==
- Ritter, Frédéric Louis (1883). Music in America. New York: Charles Scribner's Sons. OCLC 23862794.
- Thomas, Theodore (1905). George P Upton (ed.). Theodore Thomas: a Musical Autobiography. Chicago: A.C. McClurg & Co. OCLC 932580.
