= Eduard Marxsen =

German pianist, composer and teacher

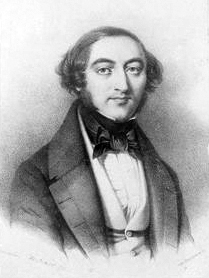
Eduard Marxsen.

Eduard Marxsen (23 July 1806 – 18 November 1887) was a German pianist, composer and teacher.

== Biography ==
Marxsen was born in Nienstädten. He was a pupil of Ignaz von Seyfried (a pupil of Mozart who conducted the premiere of the original version of Beethoven's Fidelio), Simon Sechter, Johann Heinrich Clasing, and Carl Maria von Bocklet (a close friend of Beethoven and Schubert).

His most famous student was Johannes Brahms, who dedicated his Piano Concerto No. 2 in B-flat major, Op. 83 to Marxsen. See: List of music students by teacher: K to M#Eduard Marxsen.

He wrote about 70 works, including an orchestral work named Beethovens Schatten (Beethoven's Shadow), which was performed a number of times.

He died in Altona, aged 81.

== Bibliography ==
- Jane Vial Jaffe: "Brahms as an Editor of Marxsen?", in The American Brahms Society Newsletter, vol. 28 (2010), no. 1 (Spring 2010), p. 1–5.
- Jane Vial Jaffe: "The Symphonic Side of Eduard Marxsen", in The American Brahms Society Newsletter, vol. 28 (2010), no. 2 (Fall 2010), p. 1–7.
- Jane Vial Jaffe: Eduard Marxsen and Brahms (Proquest database, Umi Dissertation Publishing, 2011).
- Page for Marxsen, mentioning a recording by Anthony Spiri of several of Marxsen's works for Piano, at prestoclassical.co.uk
