= Carl Bergmann (musician) =

German-American cellist and conductor

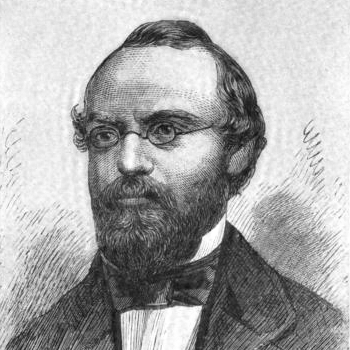

Background information
- Born: April 12, 1821; Ebersbach, Kingdom of Saxony
- Died: August 10, 1876 (aged 55) New York City
- Genre: Classical
- Occupation: Conductor
- Years active: 1850–1876
- Formerly of: New York Philharmonic

Carl Bergmann (born Ebersbach, Kingdom of Saxony, April 12, 1821; died New York, August 10, 1876) was a German-American cellist and conductor.

== Biography ==
In 1827, he began studies with Adolph Zimmerman in Zittau, and later he studied with organist-composer Adolph Hesse in Breslau. By 1842, he was conducting and playing the cello in Breslau. Eventually, Bergmann conducted orchestras in Vienna, Breslau, Budapest, Warsaw, and Venice.

Motivated by his implication in the revolutions of 1848 in Vienna, Bergmann came to the United States in 1850 as first cellist in the Germania Orchestra, a touring band of young German musicians, mostly refugees. When the conductor of that orchestra resigned the same year, Bergmann took over. The Germania Orchestra subsequently based itself in Boston before disbanding in 1854 after giving 800 concerts over its career. During this period Bergmann directed the Germanians in performances with the Handel and Haydn Society of that city, including the Boston premiere of Beethoven's Ninth Symphony. After this Bergmann went to Chicago and was immediately invited to direct the Chicago Philharmonic Society. However, he left after giving only two concerts because the Chicago musicians intrigued against him.

In 1854, he went to New York City to conduct the Männergesangverein Arion, a choral group of German-born men. When Theodore Eisfeld, conductor of the New York Philharmonic Society, became sick for the last concert of the 1854–1855 season, Bergmann replaced him, directing Wagner's Tannhäuser overture. This concert was so successful that Bergmann became sole conductor for the 1855–1856 season. In 1859 he conducted the American premiere of Tannhäuser at the Stadt Theater. It was the first performance of a Wagner opera in America. He also played cello in a renowned piano quintet that included Theodore Thomas on first violin and William Mason on piano. In addition to the philharmonic, he also conducted a choral group, the New York Harmonic Society, which later became the Mendelssohn Union. Bergmann organized and conducted a German music festival, held in the Winter Garden Theatre, in 1855, and in 1856 introduced German opera at Niblo's Garden. He conducted Italian as well as German opera in New York.

Eisfeld returned to conduct the Philharmonic Society for the 1856–1857 and 1857–1858 seasons, but Bergmann returned to the podium the next season, and shared the podium with Eisfeld between 1859 and 1865. In 1865 Eisfeld returned to Europe, and Bergmann continued as sole conductor of the Philharmonic Society until his death in 1876.

Bergmann's life and career declined after 1870. Bergmann suffered from alcoholism. Since 1864, there had been a rival orchestra conducted by Theodore Thomas to contend with. And the panic of 1873 exacerbated the philharmonic's financial problems. In 1876, the philharmonic board requested his resignation, and his wife, whose name has been lost to history, died.

In his autobiography, Theodore Thomas described Bergmann as "a talented musician and a fair 'cello player" but went on to criticize him as follows:

He gave the impression that he never worked much, or cared to do so. He lacked most of the qualities of a first-rank conductor, but he had one great redeeming quality for those days which soon brought him into prominence. He possessed an artistic nature ...

George Upton wrote:

With all his ability and his scholarship, however, Bergmann was not an industrious worker, nor was he regardful of his duties. ... At last he gave himself up to an indolent, pleasure-loving manner of life, and this alienated many of his musical associates. Near the end of his career he became very despondent. Friends abandoned him, and he died at last in a New York hospital in 1876, almost alone and forgotten.

== Conductors of the New York Philharmonic Society, 1855–1876 ==
- 1855–1856 Bergmann
- 1856–1858 Theodore Eisfeld
- 1858–1859 Bergmann
- 1859–1865 Bergmann and Eisfeld
- 1865–1876 Bergmann

== Bibliography ==
- Thomas, Theodore (1905). George P Upton (ed.). Theodore Thomas: a Musical Autobiography. Chicago: A.C. McClurg & Co. OCLC 932580.
- Upton, George P (1908). Musical Memories: My Recollections of Celebrities of the Half Century: 1850–1900. Chicago: A.C. McClurg. OCLC 392372.
- Wittke, Carl (1952). Refugees of Revolution: The German Forty-Eighters in America. Philadelphia: University of Pennsylvania Press.
