= Piano Concerto No. 2 (Brahms) =

Piano concerto by Brahms

- by Johannes Brahms
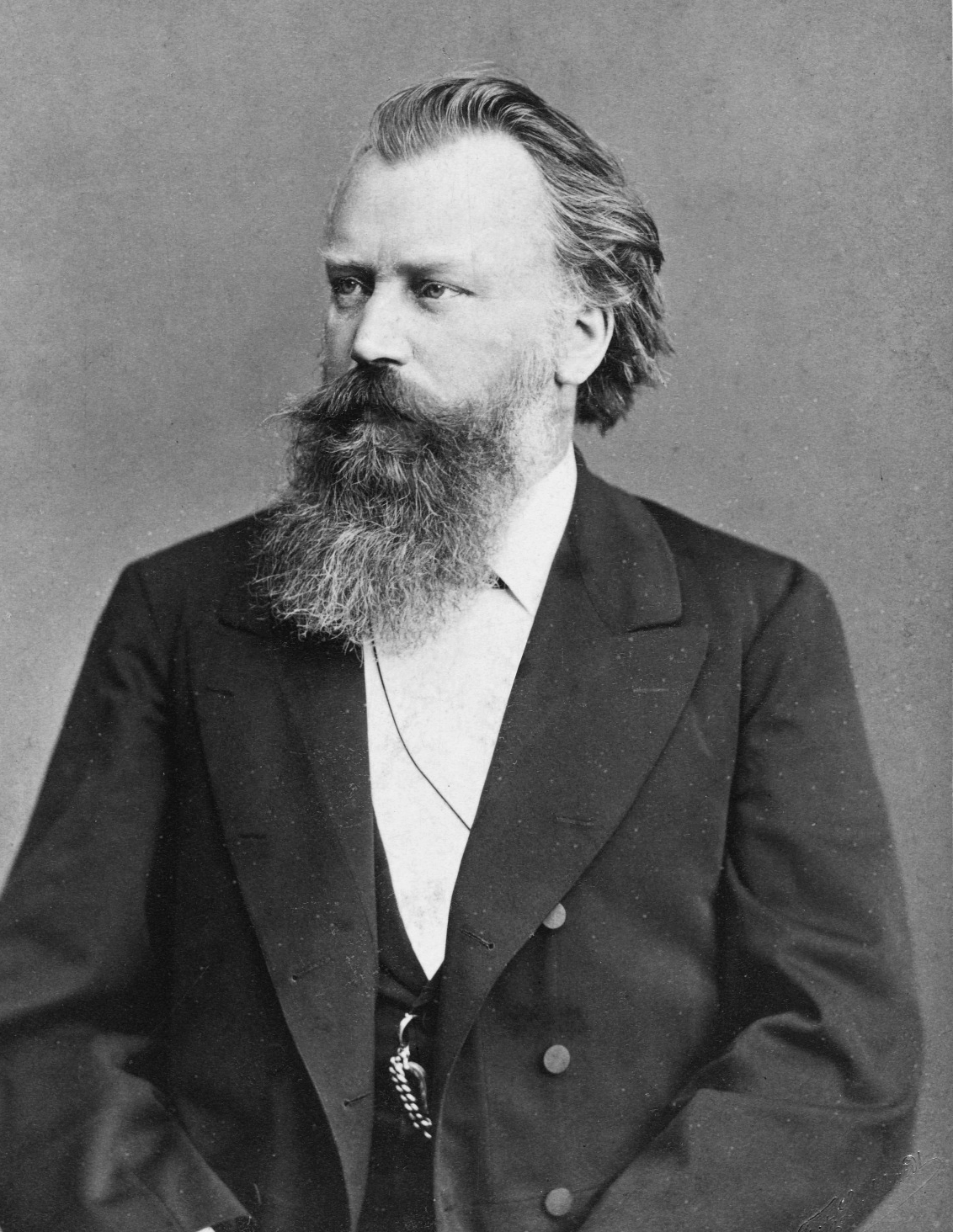
- The composer in 1885
- Key: B♭ major
- Opus: 83
- Composed: 1878–81
- Dedication: Eduard Marxsen
- Movements: 4

Premiere
- Date: 9 November 1881
- Location: Budapest
- Conductor: Alexander Erkel
- Performers: Johannes Brahms, Budapest Philharmonic Orchestra

The Piano Concerto No. 2 in B♭ major, Op. 83, by Johannes Brahms is separated by a gap of 22 years from his first piano concerto. Brahms began work on the piece in 1878 and completed it in 1881 while in Pressbaum near Vienna. It took him three years to work on this concerto, which indicates that he was always self-critical. He wrote to Clara Schumann: "I want to tell you that I have written a very small piano concerto with a very small and pretty scherzo." He was ironically describing a huge piece. This concerto is dedicated to his teacher, Eduard Marxsen.

The public premiere of the concerto was given in Budapest on 9 November 1881, with Brahms himself as soloist and the Budapest Philharmonic Orchestra, and was an immediate success. He proceeded to perform the piece in many cities across Europe.

The autograph manuscript of the concerto is preserved in the Hamburg State and University Library Carl von Ossietzky.

== Music ==
The piece is scored for 2 flutes (1st also piccolo), 2 oboes, 2 clarinets (B♭), 2 bassoons, 4 horns (initially 2 in B♭ bass, 2 in F), 2 trumpets (B♭), timpani (B♭ and F, A and D in second movement) and strings. (The trumpets and timpani are used only in the first two movements, which is unusual.)

The piece is in four movements, rather than the three typical of concertos in the Classical and Romantic periods:

1. Allegro non troppo (B♭ major)
2. Allegro appassionato (D minor)
3. Andante (B♭ major—F♯ major—B♭ major)
4. Allegretto grazioso—Un poco più presto (B♭ major)

The additional movement results in a concerto considerably longer than most other concertos written up to that time, with typical performances lasting around 50 minutes. Upon its completion, Brahms sent its score to his friend, the surgeon and violinist Theodor Billroth to whom Brahms had dedicated his first two string quartets, describing the work as "some little piano pieces." Brahms even described the stormy scherzo as a "little wisp of a scherzo."

The work opens with the following horn call, which provides much of the thematic material for the first movement:

=== I. Allegro non troppo ===
First movement, part 1 (4:02)

First movement, part 2 (4:28)
NBC Symphony Orchestra with Arturo Toscanini and Vladimir Horowitz at Carnegie Hall in 1940

The first movement is in the concerto variant of sonata form. The main theme is introduced by the horn solo, with the piano interceding. The woodwind instruments proceed to introduce a small motif (borrowed, perhaps unconsciously, from the opening of the first movement of his Serenade No. 2) before an unusually placed cadenza appears. The full orchestra repeats the theme and introduces more motifs in the orchestral exposition. The piano and orchestra work together to develop these themes in the piano exposition before the key changes to F minor (from F major, the dominant) and the piano plays a powerful and difficult section before the next orchestral tutti appears. The development, like many such sections in the Classical period, works its way from the dominant key back to the tonic while heavily developing themes. At the beginning of the recapitulation, the theme is replayed before a differing transition is heard, returning to the music heard in the piano exposition (this time in B♭ major/minor). A coda appears after the minor key section, finishing off this movement.

One motif repeated in the development has been noted by musicologists as bearing similarity to the Battle Hymn of the Republic and Say, Brothers, but it is unlikely Brahms knew of either hymn.

=== II. Allegro appassionato ===
Second movement, conclusion (3:40)
NBC Symphony Orchestra with Arturo Toscanini and Vladimir Horowitz at Carnegie Hall in 1940

This scherzo is in the key of D minor and is in sonata form with a trio inserted in the development. Contrary to Brahms' "tiny wisp of a scherzo" remark, it is a tumultuous movement. The piano and orchestra introduce the theme and develop it before a quiet section intervenes. Soon afterwards the piano and orchestra launch into a stormy development of the theme before coming to the central episode (in D major). The central episode is brisk and begins with the full orchestra before yet another quiet section intervenes; then the piano is integrated into the orchestral effect to repeat the theme of the central episode. The beginning section returns but is highly varied.

=== III. Andante ===
Third movement, conclusion (3:42)
NBC Symphony Orchestra with Arturo Toscanini and Vladimir Horowitz at Carnegie Hall in 1940

The slow movement is in the tonic key of B♭ major and is unusual in utilizing an extensive cello solo within a piano concerto (the source of this idea may be Clara Schumann's Piano Concerto, which features a slow movement scored only for cello and piano). Brahms subsequently rewrote the cello's theme and changed it into a song, Immer leiser wird mein Schlummer ("My Slumber Grows Ever More Peaceful") with lyrics by Hermann Lingg. (Op. 105, No. 2). Within the concerto, the cello plays the theme for the first three minutes, before the piano comes in. However, the gentler melodic piece that the piano plays soon gives way to a stormy theme in B♭ minor. When the storm subsides, still in the minor key, the piano plays a transitional motif that leads to the key of F♯ major, before the cello comes in to reprise, in the wrong key, and knowing that it has to get back to B♭ major, the piano and the orchestra make a brief transition to E major before finishing off the theme in its original home key of B♭ major. After the piano plays the transitional motifs, the piano quickly reprises the middle section before the final coda is established.

=== IV. Allegretto grazioso – Un poco più presto ===
Fourth movement, part 1 (3:29)

Fourth movement, part 2 (2:14)

Fourth movement, conclusion (2:55)
NBC Symphony Orchestra with Arturo Toscanini and Vladimir Horowitz at Carnegie Hall in 1940

The last movement consists of five clearly distinguishable sections, which introduce and develop five different themes.

The first section (bars 1 to 64) presents themes 1 and 2. The first theme (also the "main theme") (1–8) is first played by the piano and then repeated by the orchestra: it begins with a copy of measures 40-41 of the last movement of Mozart's piano concerto No. 27 (also in B flat). The second theme (16–20) is likewise presented by the piano and repeated – and expanded – by the orchestra. Finally, a kind of development of the first theme leads on to the next section.

The second section (65–164) contains the next three themes. Theme 3 (65–73) is very different from the previous ones, due largely to its minor setting and its distinctive Hungarian rhythm. Theme 4 (81–88) is still in a minor and theme 5 (97–104) is in F major. These three themes are each repeated back and forth several times, which gives the section the character of a development.

The third section (165–308) can be seen as a reprise of the first; it is built on the first two themes, but a striking new element is given in 201–205 and repeated in 238–241.

The fourth section (309–376) reprises themes 3, 5 and 4, in that order.

The final section, the coda, is built on the main theme, but even here (398) Brahms presents a new element, restating the main theme in triple rhythm (a device he used earlier to end his violin concerto) over a little march, first played by the piano, then answered by the orchestra, which trades themes with the soloist before the final chords.

== Performance history ==
Performances of Brahms' second piano concerto, featuring Brahms himself.

- Budapest, Austria-Hungary: 9 November 1881
- Leipzig, German Empire: 1 January 1882
- Hamburg, German Empire: 6 April 1883
- Graz, Austria-Hungary: 28 November 1884
- Vienna, Austria-Hungary: 2 December 1884
