= Serenades (Brahms) =

Orchestral works by Johannes Brahms

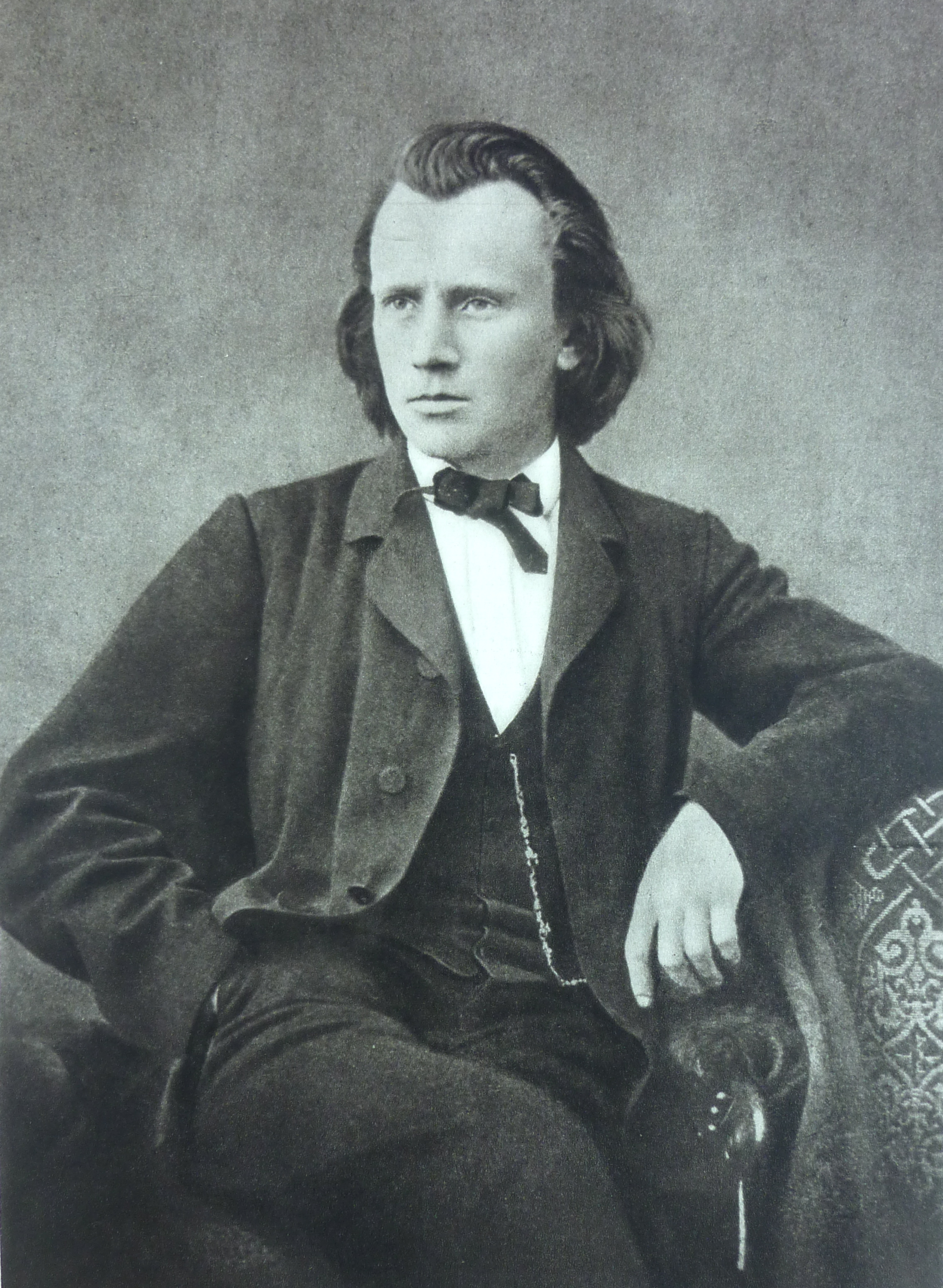
Johannes Brahms c. 1866

The two Serenades, Op. 11 and 16, are early orchestral works by Johannes Brahms. They both date from after the 1856 death of Robert Schumann when Brahms was residing in Detmold and had access to an orchestra.

Brahms had a goal of reaching Ludwig van Beethoven's level in writing symphonies, and worked long and hard on his first symphony, completing it only in 1876 when he was 43 years old. As preliminary steps in composing for orchestra, he chose early on to write some lighter orchestral pieces, these Serenades. The second was first sent to Clara Schumann, who was delighted by it.

== Serenade No. 1 in D, Op. 11 ==
The first serenade was completed in 1858. At that time, Brahms was also working on his Piano Concerto No. 1. Originally scored for wind and string nonet and then expanded into a longer work for chamber orchestra, the serenade was later adapted for orchestra; Brahms completed the final version for large orchestra in December 1859. In the orchestration of the Concerto, Brahms had solicited and got a great deal of advice from his good friend Joseph Joachim. For this Serenade, Joachim also gave advice, although to a lesser extent.

The first performance of the Serenade, in Hanover on 3 March 1860, "did not go very well" in Brahms's opinion, but evidently the unusually large audience of 1,200 did not notice any mistake during the performance. At the end, applause "persisted until I came out and down in front." After every piece in the concert "the audience was shouting." This was a vastly better reception than the Piano Concerto had in either of its first two performances. But at its third performance, 24 March, also in Hamburg, it had been a success, perhaps not to the same degree as the Serenade.

The Serenade consists of six movements and lasts around 45 minutes.

1. Allegro molto (D major)
2. Scherzo. Allegro non troppo (D minor) – Trio. Poco più moto (B♭ major)
3. Adagio non troppo (B♭ major)
4. Menuetto I (G major) – Menuetto II (G minor)
5. Scherzo. Allegro (D major) – Trio
6. Rondo. Allegro (D major)

Scorings for Serenade 1 are:

- Nonet: flute, 2 clarinets in A (movements I, V, VI) and B flat (movements II, III, IV), bassoon, horn, violin, viola, cello, double bass
- Orchestra: 2 flutes, 2 oboes, 2 clarinets (as in the nonet), 2 bassoons, 4 horns, 2 trumpets, timpani, strings (violins I and II, viola, cello, double bass)

=== Critical commentary ===
The musicologist Bryan Proksch (2014:65) suggested that the opening theme of the first movement of the Serenade was modeled on the opening of the last movement of Haydn's 104th Symphony in the same key. The two themes both are preceded and accompanied by a bagpipe-like drone.

Haydn 104th symphony, finale:

Brahms serenade:

Proksch further suggests that Schumann himself had quoted the opening bars of the 104th Symphony in his own Second Symphony, and had introduced the Haydn 104th to his young protegé. In later life Brahms was a devotee of Haydn, praising him highly to others and collecting the composer's autograph manuscripts.

== Serenade No. 2 in A, Op. 16 ==
The second serenade was written in 1859 and dedicated to Clara Schumann. The first public performance, reportedly for full orchestra (version lost?), was in Hamburg on 10 February 1860.

Brahms himself reworked the piece for piano 4 hands in 1875. The same year he revisited the orchestral version, this time for chamber orchestra. The new scoring was for piccolo, 2 flutes, 2 oboes, 2 clarinets (in A for movements I, IV, V; in C for movement II; and in B flat for movement III), 2 bassoons, 2 horns, violas, cellos, and double basses, omitting violins, trumpets, trombones, and percussion.

The five movements take approximately thirty minutes to perform.

1. Allegro moderato (A major)
2. Scherzo. Vivace (C major) – Trio (F major)
3. Adagio non troppo (A minor, ends in A major with a Picardy third)
4. Quasi menuetto (D major) – Trio (F♯ minor)
5. Rondo. Allegro (A major)

== Notes ==
Sources

- Avins, Styra, ed. (1997). Johannes Brahms: Life and Letters. Oxford University Press. ISBN 0-19-816234-0.
- Geiringer, Karl (1984). Brahms: His Life and Work – Third Enlarged Edition. New York: Da Capo Press. ISBN 978-0-306-80223-2.
- Proksch, Bryan (2014) Reviving Haydn: New appreciations in the twentieth century. Rochester, New York: University of Rochester Press.
