= New York Philharmonic =

American symphony orchestra

- Orchestra
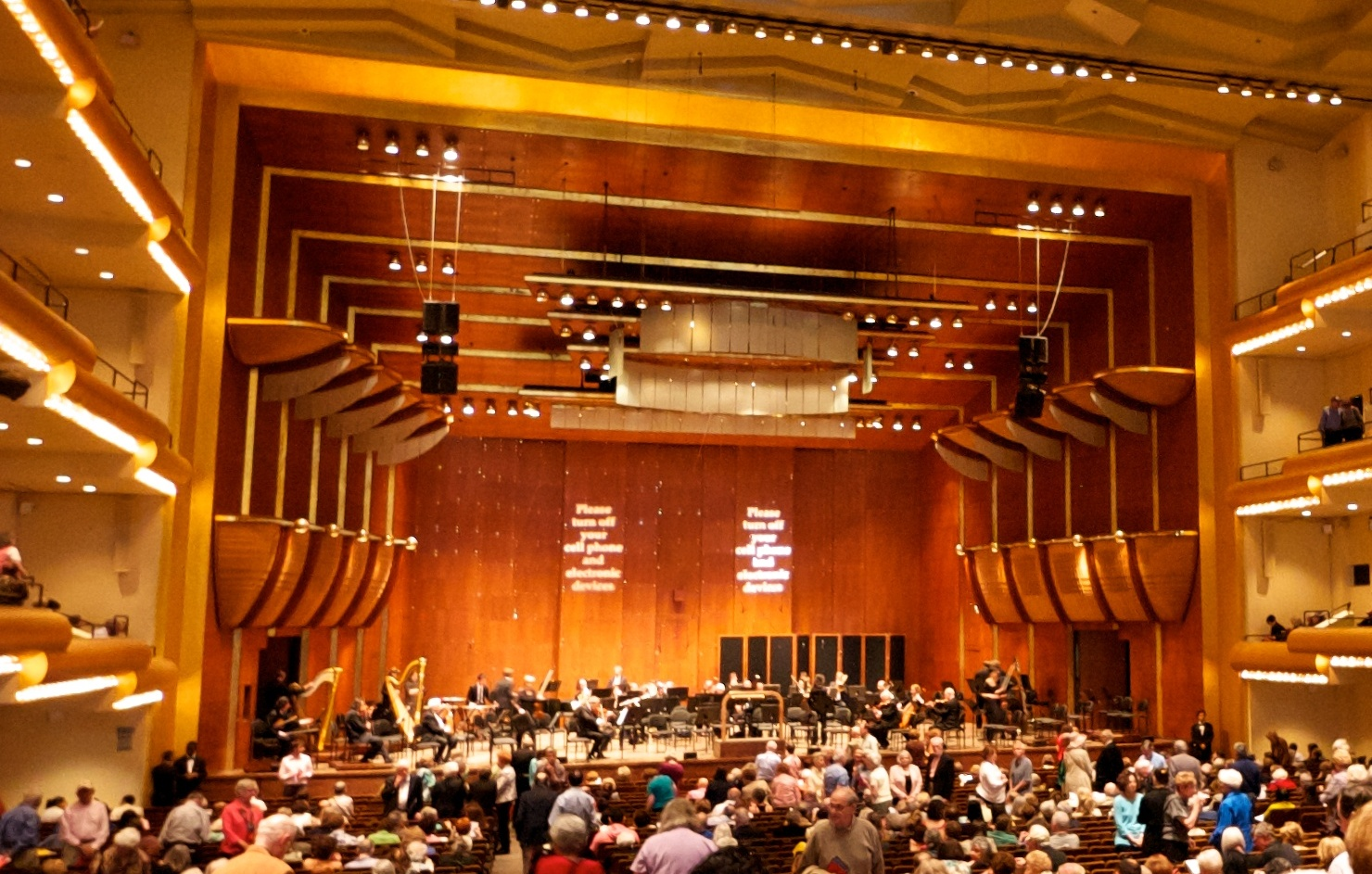
- Founded: 1842; 184 years ago
- Location: New York City, United States
- Concert hall: David Geffen Hall at Lincoln Center
- Music director: Gustavo Dudamel
- Website: nyphil.org
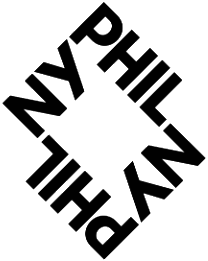

The New York Philharmonic is an American symphony orchestra based in New York City. Known officially as the Philharmonic-Symphony Society of New York, Inc., and globally known as the New York Philharmonic Orchestra (NYPO) or the New York Philharmonic-Symphony Orchestra, it is one of the leading American orchestras popularly called the "Big Five". The philharmonic's home is David Geffen Hall, at New York's Lincoln Center for the Performing Arts.

Founded in 1842, the orchestra is one of the oldest musical institutions in the United States and the oldest of the "Big Five" orchestras. Its 14,000th concert was given in December 2004.

== History ==
=== Founding and first concert, 1842 ===
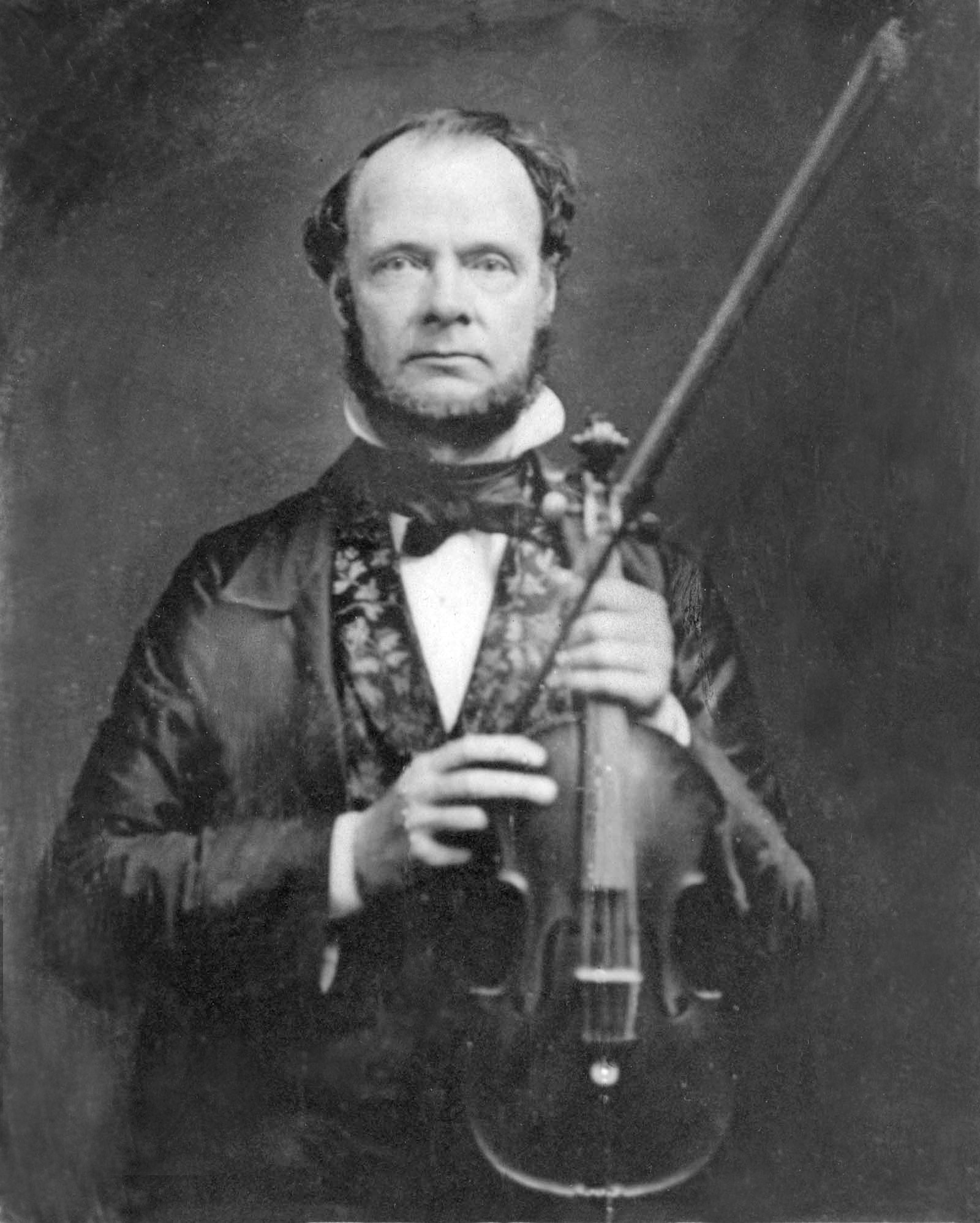
Ureli Corelli Hill, founding father and first conductor of the New York Philharmonic

The New York Philharmonic was founded in 1842 by the American conductor Ureli Corelli Hill, with the aid of the Irish composer William Vincent Wallace. The orchestra was then called the Philharmonic Society of New York. It was the third philharmonic on American soil since 1799, and had as its intended purpose, "the advancement of instrumental music." The first concert of the Philharmonic Society took place on December 7, 1842, in the Apollo Rooms on lower Broadway before an audience of 600. The concert opened with Beethoven's Symphony No. 5, led by Hill himself. Two other conductors, German-born Henry Christian Timm and French-born Denis Etienne, led parts of the eclectic, three-hour program, which included chamber music and several operatic selections with a leading singer of the day, as was the custom. The musicians operated as a cooperative society, deciding by a majority vote such issues as who would become a member, which music would be performed and who among them would conduct. At the end of the season, the players would divide any proceeds among themselves.

=== Beethoven's Ninth and a new home, 1846 ===
Apollo Rooms, from NYC Philharmonic Archives

After only a dozen public performances and barely four years old, the philharmonic organized a concert to raise funds to build a new music hall. The centerpiece was the American premiere of Beethoven's Symphony No. 9, to take place at Castle Garden on the southern tip of Manhattan. About 400 instrumental and vocal performers gathered for this premiere, which was conducted by George Loder. The chorals were translated into what would be the first English performance anywhere in the world. However, with the expensive US$2.00 ticket price and a war rally uptown, the hoped-for audience was kept away and the new hall would have to wait. Although judged by some as an odd work with all those singers kept at bay until the end, the Ninth soon became the work performed most often when a grand gesture was required.

During the philharmonic's first seven seasons, seven musicians alternated the conducting duties. In addition to Hill, Timm and Étienne, these were William Alpers, George Loder, Louis Wiegers and Alfred Boucher. This changed in 1849 when Theodore Eisfeld was installed as sole conductor for the season. Eisfeld, later along with Carl Bergmann, would be the conductor until 1865. That year, Eisfeld conducted the orchestra's memorial concert for the recently assassinated Abraham Lincoln, but in a peculiar turn of events which were criticized in the New York press, the philharmonic omitted the last movement, "Ode to Joy", as being inappropriate for the occasion. That year Eisfeld returned to Europe, and Bergmann continued to conduct the society until his death in 1876.

=== Competition, 1878 ===
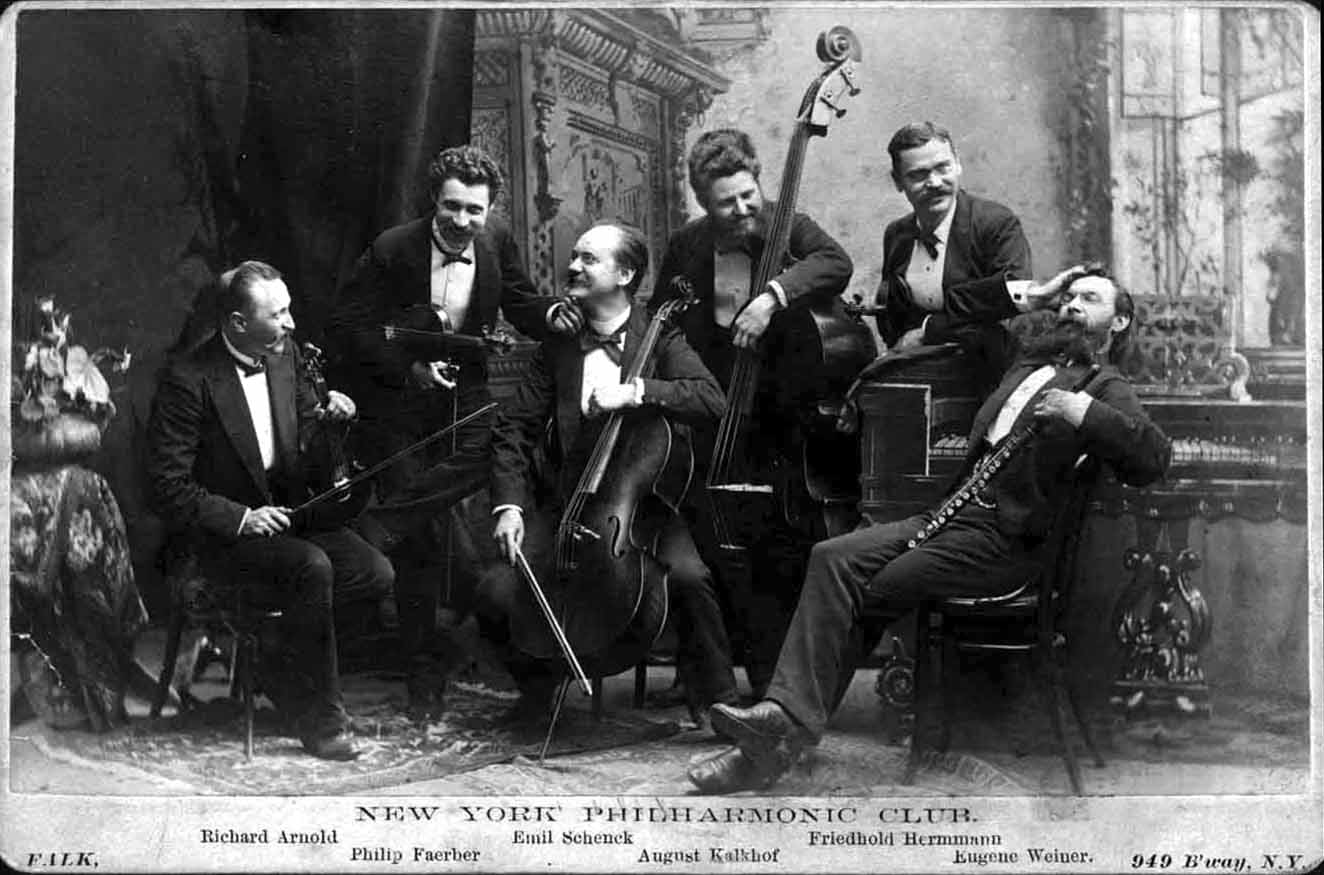
The New York Philharmonic Club, a chamber ensemble of Philharmonic musicians, clowning for their public-relations photograph in the 1880s. New York Philharmonic Archives

Leopold Damrosch, Franz Liszt's former concertmaster at Weimar, served as conductor of the Philharmonic for the 1876/77 season. But failing to win support from the philharmonic's public, he left to create the rival Symphony Society of New York in 1878. Upon his death in 1885, his 23-year-old son Walter took over and continued the competition with the old philharmonic. It was Walter who would convince Andrew Carnegie that New York needed a first-class concert hall and on May 5, 1891, both Walter and Russian composer Piotr Ilyich Tchaikovsky conducted at the inaugural concert of the city's new Music Hall, which in a few years would be renamed for its primary benefactor, Andrew Carnegie. Carnegie Hall would remain the orchestra's home until 1962.

=== Theodore Thomas ===
The philharmonic in 1877 was in desperate financial condition, caused by the paltry income from five concerts in the 1876/77 season that brought in an average of only $168 per concert. Representatives of the philharmonic wished to attract the German-born, American-trained conductor Theodore Thomas, whose own Theodore Thomas Orchestra had competed directly with the Philharmonic for over a decade and which had brought him fame and great success. At first the philharmonic's suggestion offended Thomas because he was unwilling to disband his own orchestra. Because of the desperate financial circumstances, the philharmonic offered Theodore Thomas the conductorship without conditions, and he began conducting the orchestra in the autumn of 1877. With the exception of the 1878/79 season—when he was in Cincinnati and Adolph Neuendorff led the group—Thomas conducted every season for 14 years, vastly improving the orchestra's financial health while creating a polished and virtuosic ensemble. He left in 1891 to found the Chicago Symphony, taking 13 Philharmonic musicians with him.

Another celebrated conductor, Anton Seidl, followed Thomas on the philharmonic podium, serving until 1898. Seidl, who had served as Wagner's assistant, was a renowned conductor of the composer's works; Seidl's romantic interpretations inspired both adulation and controversy. During his tenure, the philharmonic enjoyed a period of unprecedented success and prosperity and performed its first world premiere written by a world-renowned composer in the United States—Antonín Dvořák's Ninth Symphony, "From the New World". Seidl's sudden death in 1898 from food poisoning at age 47 was widely mourned. Twelve thousand people applied for tickets to his funeral at the Metropolitan Opera House and the streets were jammed for blocks with a "surging mass" of his admirers.

According to Joseph Horowitz, Seidl's death was followed by "five unsuccessful seasons" under Emil Paur, music director from 1898 to 1902, and Walter Damrosch, who served for only one season, 1902/03. After that, he says, for several seasons (1903–1906) the orchestra employed guest conductors, including Victor Herbert, Édouard Colonne, Willem Mengelberg, Fritz Steinbach, Richard Strauss, Felix Weingartner, and Henry Wood.

=== New management, 1909 ===
In 1909, to ensure the philharmonic's financial stability, a group of wealthy New Yorkers led by two women, Mary Seney Sheldon and Minnie Untermyer, formed the Guarantors Committee and changed the orchestra's organization from a musician-operated cooperative to a corporate management structure. The Guarantors were responsible for bringing Gustav Mahler to the philharmonic as principal conductor and expanding the season from 18 concerts to 54, which included a tour of New England. The philharmonic was the only symphonic orchestra where Mahler worked as music director without any opera responsibilities, freeing him to explore the symphonic literature more deeply. In New York, he conducted several works for the first time in his career and introduced audiences to his compositions. Under Mahler, a controversial figure both as a composer and conductor, the season expanded, musicians' salaries were guaranteed, the scope of operations broadened, and the 20th-century orchestra was created.

In 1911, Mahler died unexpectedly, and the philharmonic appointed Josef Stránský as his replacement. Many commentators were surprised by the choice of Stránský, whom they did not see as a worthy successor to Mahler. Stránský led all the orchestra's concerts until 1920, and also made the first recordings with the orchestra in 1917.

=== Mergers and outreach, 1921 ===
In 1921 the philharmonic merged with New York's National Symphony Orchestra (no relation to the present Washington, D.C. ensemble). With this merger it also acquired the imposing Dutch conductor Willem Mengelberg. For the 1922/23 season Stránský and Mengelberg shared the conducting duties, but Stránský left after that season. For nine years Mengelberg dominated the scene, although other conductors, among them Bruno Walter, Wilhelm Furtwängler, Igor Stravinsky, and Arturo Toscanini, led about half of each season's concerts. During this period, the philharmonic became one of the first American orchestras with an outdoor symphony series when it began playing low-priced summer concerts at Lewisohn Stadium in upper Manhattan. In 1920 the orchestra hired Henry Hadley as "associate conductor" given specific responsibility for the "Americanization" of the orchestra: each of Hadley's concerts featured at least one work by an American-born composer. In 1922, harpist Stephanie Goldner became the orchestra's first female member.

In 1924, the Young People's Concerts were expanded into a substantial series of children's concerts under the direction of American pianist-composer-conductor Ernest Schelling. This series became the prototype for concerts of its kind around the country and grew by popular demand to 15 concerts per season by the end of the decade.

Mengelberg and Toscanini both led the philharmonic in recording sessions for the Victor Talking Machine Company and Brunswick Records, initially in a recording studio (for the acoustically recorded Victors, all under Mengelberg) and eventually in Carnegie Hall as electrical recording was developed. All of the early electrical recordings for Victor were made with a single microphone, usually placed near or above the conductor, a process Victor called "Orthophonic"; the Brunswick electricals used the company's proprietary non-microphone "Light-Ray" selenium-cell system, which was much more prone to sonic distortion than Victor's. Mengelberg's first records for Victor were acousticals made in 1922; Toscanini's recordings with the philharmonic actually began with a single disc for Brunswick in 1926, recorded in a rehearsal hall at Carnegie Hall. Mengelberg's most successful recording with the philharmonic was a 1927 performance in Carnegie Hall of Richard Strauss' Ein Heldenleben. Additional Toscanini recordings with the philharmonic, all for Victor, took place on Carnegie Hall's stage in 1929 and 1936. By the 1936 sessions Victor, now owned by RCA, began to experiment with multiple microphones to achieve more comprehensive reproductions of the orchestra.

1928 marked the philharmonic's last and most important merger, with the New York Symphony Society. The symphony had been quite innovative in its 50 years before the merger. It made its first domestic tour in 1882, introduced educational concerts for young people in 1891, and premiered works such as Gershwin's Concerto in F and Holst's Egdon Heath. The two institutions' merger consolidated extraordinary financial and musical resources. Of the new Philharmonic Symphony Society of New York, Clarence Hungerford Mackay, chairman of the Philharmonic Society, was chairman.

=== The Maestro, 1930 ===
Arturo Toscanini (standing in the center, sporting a bow tie and cap) with the orchestra aboard the S.S de Grasse, embarking on their European tour, 1930. New York Philharmonic Archives

The merger had ramifications for the musicians of both orchestras. Winthrop Sargeant, a violinist with the Symphony Society and later a writer for The New Yorker, recalled the merger as "a sort of surgical operation in which twenty musicians were removed from the Philharmonic and their places taken by a small surviving band of twenty legionnaires from the New York Symphony. This operation was performed by Arturo Toscanini himself. Fifty-seventh Street wallowed in panic and recrimination." Toscanini, who had guest-conducted for several seasons, became the sole conductor and in 1930 led the group on a European tour that brought immediate international fame to the orchestra. Toscanini remained music director until 1936, then returned several times as a guest conductor until 1945.

That same year nationwide radio broadcasts began. The orchestra was first heard on CBS directly from Carnegie Hall. To broadcast the Sunday afternoon concerts, CBS paid $15,000 for the entire season. The radio broadcasts continued without interruption for 38 years. A legend in his own time, Toscanini proved a tough act to follow as the country headed into war.

=== The War years, 1940 ===
After an unsuccessful attempt to hire the German conductor Wilhelm Furtwängler, the English conductor John Barbirolli and the Polish conductor Artur Rodziński jointly replaced Toscanini in 1936. The next year, Barbirolli was given the full conductorship, a post he held until 1941. In December 1942, Bruno Walter was offered the music directorship, but declined, citing his age (he was 67). In 1943, Rodziński, who had conducted the orchestra's centennial concert at Carnegie Hall the previous year, was appointed music director. He had also conducted the Sunday afternoon radio broadcast when CBS listeners around the country heard the announcer break in on Arthur Rubinstein's performance of Brahms's Second Piano Concerto to inform them of the attack on Pearl Harbor. (Initial word of the attack was forwarded by CBS News correspondent John Charles Daly on his own show before the philharmonic broadcast.) Soon after the U.S. entered World War II, Aaron Copland wrote A Lincoln Portrait for the philharmonic at the request of conductor Andre Kostelanetz as a tribute to and expression of the "magnificent spirit of our country."

Rodziński, Walter, and Sir Thomas Beecham made a series of recordings with the Philharmonic for Columbia Records during the 1940s. Many of the sessions were held in Liederkranz Hall, on East 58th Street, a building formerly belonging to a German cultural and musical society, and used as a recording studio by Columbia Records. Sony Records later digitally remastered all of these recordings, as well as Barbirolli's for reissue on CD.

=== The Telegenic Age, 1950 ===
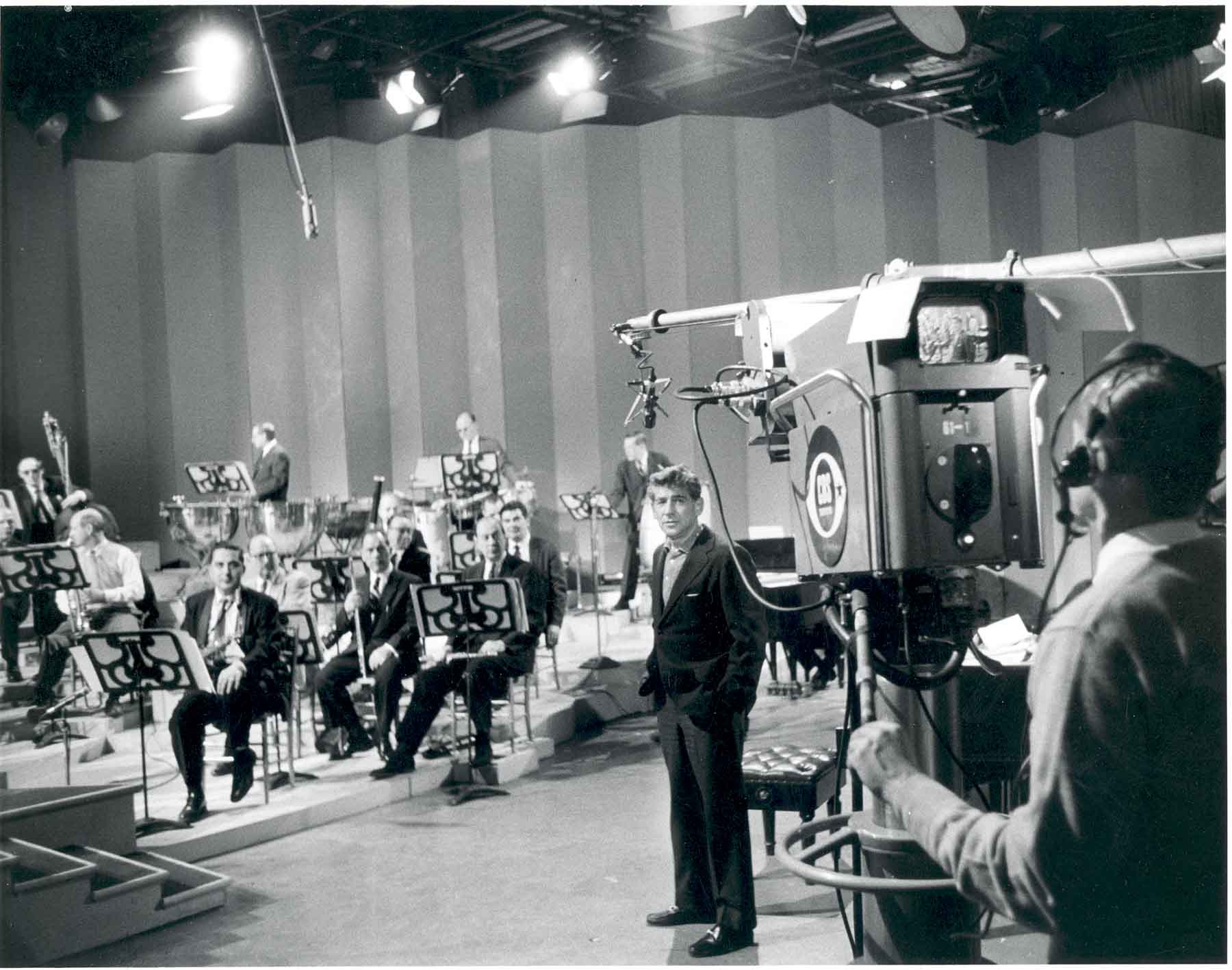
Leonard Bernstein with members of the Philharmonic rehearsing for a television broadcast, circa 1958. Bert Bial, New York Philharmonic Archives

In February 1947, Rodziński resigned; Walter was once again approached, and this time he accepted the position on the condition that the title be reduced to "Music Adviser"; he resigned in 1949. Leopold Stokowski and Dimitri Mitropoulos were appointed co-principal conductors in 1949, with Mitropoulos becoming musical director in 1951. Known for championing new composers and obscure operas-in-concert, Mitropoulos pioneered in other ways, adding live philharmonic performances between movies at the Roxy Theatre and taking Edward R. Murrow and the See It Now television audience on a behind-the-scenes tour of the orchestra. He made a series of recordings for Columbia Records, mostly in mono; near the end of his tenure, he recorded excerpts from Prokofiev's ballet Romeo and Juliet in stereo. In 1957, Mitropoulos and Leonard Bernstein served together as Principal Conductors until, in the course of the season, Bernstein was appointed music director, becoming the first American-born-and-trained conductor to head the philharmonic.

Bernstein, who had made his historic, unrehearsed and spectacularly successful debut with the philharmonic in 1943, was music director for 11 seasons, a time of significant change and growth. Two television series were initiated on CBS: the Young People's Concerts and Leonard Bernstein and the New York Philharmonic. The former, launched in 1958, made television history, winning every award in the field of educational television. Bernstein continued the orchestra's recordings with Columbia Records until he retired as music director in 1969. He made a few recordings for Columbia after 1969, but most of his later recordings were for Deutsche Grammophon. Sony has digitally remastered Bernstein's numerous Columbia recordings and released them on CD as a part of its extensive "Bernstein Century" series. The philharmonic performed primarily in Carnegie Hall until 1962, but Bernstein preferred to record in the Manhattan Center. His later recordings were made in Philharmonic Hall. In 1960, the centennial of Gustav Mahler's birth, Bernstein and the philharmonic began a historic cycle of recordings of eight of Mahler's nine symphonies for Columbia Records. (Symphony No. 8 was recorded by Bernstein with the London Symphony.) In 1962 Bernstein caused controversy with his comments before a performance by Glenn Gould of the First Piano Concerto of Johannes Brahms.

=== Modern music, 1962 ===
In 1962, Bernstein hired the orchestra's first Black member, violinist Sanford Allen. Bernstein, a lifelong advocate of living composers, oversaw the beginning of the orchestra's largest commissioning project, resulting in the creation of 109 new works for orchestra. In September 1962, the philharmonic commissioned Aaron Copland to write a new work, Connotations for Orchestra, for the opening concert of the new Lincoln Center for the Performing Arts. The move to Philharmonic Hall in Lincoln Center brought about an expansion of concerts into the spring and summer. Among the many series that have taken place during the off-season have been the French-American and Stravinsky Festivals (1960s), Pierre Boulez's "Rug Concerts" in the 1970s, and composer, Jacob Druckman's Horizon's Festivals in the 1980s.

Orin O'Brien became the first woman to join the orchestra in 1966.

The orchestra celebrated its 125th birthday on December 7, 1967, with a concert attended by over 200 soloists, conductors, and composers who had previously appeared with the orchestra. The concert was followed by a reception at Lincoln Center's New York State Theater.

In 1971, Pierre Boulez became the first Frenchman to hold the post of philharmonic music director. Boulez's years with the orchestra were notable for expanded repertoire and innovative concert approaches, such as the "Prospective Encounters" which explored new works along with the composer in alternative venues. During his tenure, the philharmonic inaugurated the "Live From Lincoln Center" television series in 1976, and the orchestra continues to appear on the Emmy Award-winning program to the present day. Boulez made a series of quadraphonic recordings for Columbia, including an extensive series of the orchestral music of Maurice Ravel.

Members of the New York Philharmonic string section are heard on the 1971 John Lennon album Imagine, credited as '"The Flux Fiddlers".

=== Ambassadors abroad ===
Zubin Mehta, then one of the youngest of a new generation of internationally known conductors, became music director in 1978. His tenure was the longest in philharmonic history, lasting until 1991. Throughout his time on the podium, Mehta showed a strong commitment to contemporary music, presenting 52 works for the first time. In 1980 the philharmonic, always known as a touring orchestra, embarked on a European tour marking the 50th anniversary of Toscanini's trip to Europe.

Kurt Masur, who had been conducting the philharmonic frequently since his debut in 1981, became music director in 1991. Notable aspects of his tenure included a series of free Memorial Day Concerts at the Cathedral of St. John the Divine and annual concert tours abroad, including the orchestra's first trip to mainland China. He presided over the 150th Anniversary celebrations during the 1992–1993 season. His tenure concluded in 2002, and he was named music director emeritus of the philharmonic.

=== A third century, 2000 ===
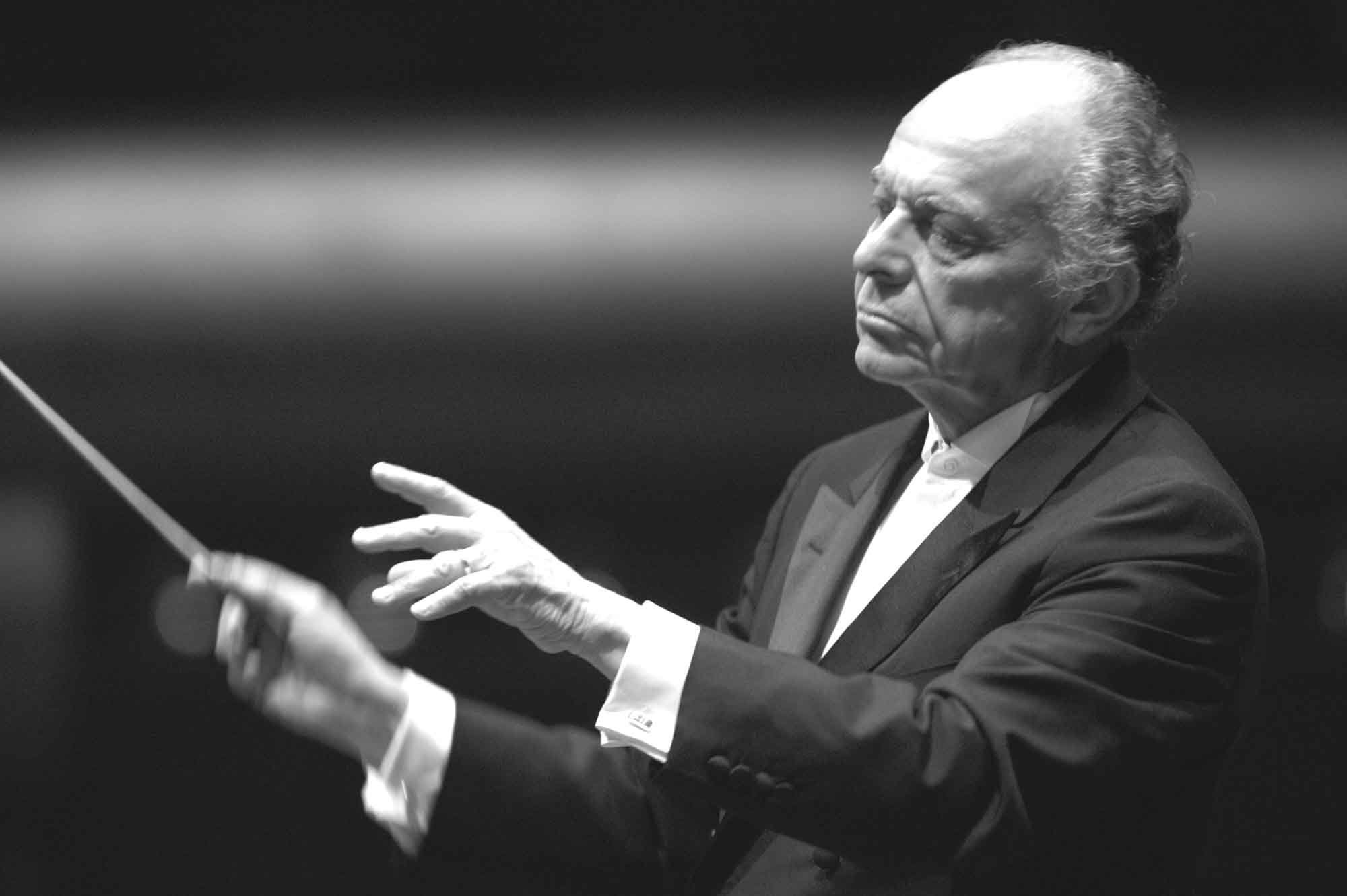
Lorin Maazel

In 2000, Lorin Maazel made a guest-conducting appearance with the New York Philharmonic in two weeks of subscription concerts after an absence of over twenty years, which was met with a positive reaction from the orchestra musicians. This engagement led to his appointment in January 2001 as the orchestra's next music director. He assumed the post in September 2002, 60 years after making his debut with the orchestra at the age of twelve at Lewisohn Stadium. In his first subscription week he led the world premiere of John Adams' On the Transmigration of Souls commissioned in memory of those who died on September 11, 2001. Maazel concluded his tenure as the philharmonic's music director at the end of the 2008/09 season.

In 2003, due to ongoing concerns with the acoustics of Avery Fisher Hall, there was a proposal to move the New York Philharmonic back to Carnegie Hall and merge the two organizations, but this proposal did not come to fruition.

==== Visit to North Korea, 2008 ====
The philharmonic performed in Pyongyang at the invitation of the North Korean government on February 26, 2008. The event was the first significant cultural visit to the country from the United States since the end of the Korean War. The concert was held at East Pyongyang Grand Theatre, with a program including the national anthems of both North Korea (Aegukka) and the United States (The Star-Spangled Banner), the Prelude to Act III of Lohengrin by Richard Wagner, Antonín Dvořák's Symphony No. 9 "From the New World", George Gershwin's An American in Paris, Georges Bizet's Farandole, Leonard Bernstein's Overture to Candide, and the popular Korean folk song Arirang. The Dvořák, Gershwin, and Bernstein works were each originally premiered by the New York Philharmonic.

The visit was anticipated as an opportunity to broaden relations with one of the world's most isolated nations. The U.S. State Department viewed the invitation as a potential softening of anti-U.S. propaganda. In response to initial criticism of performing a concert limited to the privileged elite, the New York Philharmonic arranged for the concert to be broadcast live on North Korean television and radio. It was additionally broadcast live on CNN and CNN International. It was also shown on South Korea's Munhwa Broadcasting Corporation to the entire nation of the Republic of Korea (ROK).

=== Recent history ===
On July 18, 2007, the philharmonic named Alan Gilbert as its next music director, effective with the 2009/10 season, with an initial contract of five years. On May 5, 2010, the New York Philharmonic performed its 15,000th concert, a milestone unmatched by any other symphony orchestra in the world. In October 2012, the orchestra extended Gilbert's contract through the 2016–2017 season. In February 2015, the orchestra announced the scheduled conclusion of Gilbert's tenure its music director after the close of the 2016/17 season.

In January 2016, the orchestra announced the appointment of Jaap van Zweden as its next music director, effective with the 2018–2019 season, with an initial contract of five years. van Zweden served as music director designate for the 2017–2018 season. In September 2021, van Zweden stated his intention to stand down as the orchestra's music director at the close of the 2023–2024 season.

In 2018 the philharmonic changed its dress code, allowing its female musicians to wear pants at its evening concerts; they had been required to wear floor-length black skirts or gowns at them before this.

Past presidents and chief executive officers (CEO) of the orchestra have included Deborah Borda. Borda had previously held the same posts, as well as the post of managing director, with the orchestra. Borda stood down as the orchestra's president and CEO on June 30, 2023. In June 2022, the orchestra announced the appointment of Gary Ginstling as its next president and CEO, effective July 1, 2023. Ginstling took the title of executive director with the orchestra in the autumn of 2022.

During the COVID-19 pandemic, the orchestra was unable to give live concerts in David Geffen Hall as of March 2020. Renovation of David Geffen Hall commenced during the pandemic, with a scheduled reopening of the renovated hall at the start of the 2022–2023 season. The orchestra performed concerts at other New York City venues during the 2021–2022 season, including Alice Tully Hall, the Rose Theater, and Carnegie Hall.

In November 2022, the orchestra was made up of a majority of women—45 women and 44 men—for the first time in its history. It still had only one Black member—principal clarinetist Anthony McGill—just as it had in 1962.

Gustavo Dudamel first guest-conducted the New York Philharmonic in 2007. Following 26 additional guest-conducting appearances with the orchestra, the New York Philharmonic announced, in February 2023, the appointment of Dudamel as its next music director, effective with the 2026–2027 season, with an initial contract of 5 years.

In April 2024, the orchestra's management commissioned an outside investigation after years of news reports of a culture of sexual harassment within the organization. On July 11, 2024, Ginstling resigned as the orchestra's president and chief executive, with immediate effect. In December 2024, the orchestra announced the appointment of Matías Tarnopolsky as its next president and chief executive officer, effective January 1, 2025.

== Music directors ==
- Ureli Corelli Hill, Henry Timm, Denis Etienne, William Alpers, George Loder, Louis Wiegers and Alfred Boucher (1842–1849)
- Theodore Eisfeld (1849–1854)
- Theodore Eisfeld and Henry Timm (1854–1855)
- Carl Bergmann (1855–1856)
- Theodore Eisfeld (1856–1858)
- Carl Bergmann (1858–1859)
- Carl Bergmann and Theodore Eisfeld (1859–1865)
- Carl Bergmann (1865–1876)
- Leopold Damrosch (1876–1877)
- Theodore Thomas (1877–1878)
- Adolf Neuendorff (1878–1879)
- Theodore Thomas (1879–1891)
- Anton Seidl (1891–1898)
- Emil Paur (1898–1902)
- Walter Damrosch (1902–1903)
- Vasily Safonov (1906–1909)
- Gustav Mahler (1909–1911)
- Josef Stránský (1911–1923)
- Willem Mengelberg (1922–1928)
- Arturo Toscanini (1928–1936)
- John Barbirolli (1936–1941)
- Artur Rodziński (1943–1947)
- Bruno Walter (1947–1949)
- Dimitri Mitropoulos (1949–1958)
- Leonard Bernstein (1958–1969)
- Pierre Boulez (1971–1977)
- Zubin Mehta (1978–1991)
- Kurt Masur (1991–2002)
- Lorin Maazel (2002–2009)
- Alan Gilbert (2009–2017)
- Jaap van Zweden (2018–2024)
- Gustavo Dudamel (2026–present)

=== Other conductors in leadership positions ===
- Bruno Walter (music advisor, 1947–1949)
- Leopold Stokowski (co-principal conductor, 1949–1950)
- George Szell (music advisor, 1969–1970)

== Concertmasters ==
- Richard Arnold (1885–1909)
- Theodore Spiering (1909–1915)
- Maximilian Pilzer (1915–1917)
- Alfred Eugene Megerlin (1917–1921)
- Scipione Guidi (1921–1931)
- Mishel Piastro (1931–1943)
- John Corigliano, Sr. (1943–1966)
- Jacob Krachmalnik (Spring 1961)
- David Nadien (1966 – September 1970)
- Frank Gullino (a.i. October 1970–1971)
- Rafael Druian (1971–1974)
- Eliot Chapo (1973–1976)
- Rodney Friend (1976–1980)
- Sidney Harth (a.i. 1979–1980)
- Glenn Dicterow (1980–2014)
- Frank Huang (2015–present)

== Leonard Bernstein Scholar-in-Residence ==
The Leonard Bernstein Scholar-in-Residence was established in 2005 in recognition of the fifteenth anniversary of Bernstein's death. The SiR gives an annual lecture series and is also featured in NYP events. Conductor Charles Zachary Bornstein was the first Leonard Bernstein Scholar-in-Residence, serving from 2005 through 2008. James M. Keller held the position during the 2008–2009 season, and American baritone Thomas Hampson was appointed to the post in July 2009. The current holder of the position is Michael Beckerman, Carroll and Milton Petrie Chair and Collegiate Professor of Music at New York University.

== Composer in residence ==
Alan Gilbert introduced the position of a Marie-Josée Kravis composer in residence, which is a three-year appointment.

- Magnus Lindberg (2009–2012)
- Christopher Rouse (2012–2015)
- Esa-Pekka Salonen (2015–2018)

== Honors and awards ==
Grammy Award for Best Classical Album

- 1965 Bernstein: Symphony No. 3 "Kaddish"
- 1974 Bartók: Concerto for Orchestra
- 1978 Concert of the Century
- 1991 Ives: Symphony No. 2; Gong on the Hook and Ladder; Central Park in the Dark; The Unanswered Question
- 2005 Adams: On the Transmigration of Souls

Grammy Award for Best Orchestral Performance

- 1990 Mahler: Symphony No. 3 in D Minor
- 1974 Bartók: Concerto for Orchestra
- 1976 Ravel: Daphnis et Chloé
- 2005 Adams: On the Transmigration of Souls

Grammy Award for Best Album for Children

- 1962 Prokofiev: Peter and the Wolf
- 1963 Saint-Saëns: The Carnival of the Animals; Britten: Young Person's Guide to the Orchestra
- 1964 Bernstein: Young People's Concerts

Grammy Award for Best Instrumental Soloist with Orchestra

- 1979 Horowitz Golden Jubilee – Rachmaninoff: Piano Concerto No. 3
- 1982 Isaac Stern 60th Anniversary Celebration

Grammy Award for Best Classical Vocal Performance

- 1963 Wagner: Götterdämmerung: Brünnhilde's Immolation Scene; Die Walküre: Wesendonck Lieder

Grammy Award for Best Choral Performance

- 1970 Berio: Sinfonia

Grammy Award for Best Engineered Album, Classical

- 1976 Ravel: Daphnis et Chloé
- 1979 Varèse: Amériques/Arcana/Ionisation
- 1982 Isaac Stern 60th Anniversary Celebration

== Archives ==
The New York Philharmonic Archives documents the history of the philharmonic through visual and ephemeral history and printed music collections. The collection dates back to the beginning of the philharmonic's history in 1842. The archives are sponsored by the Leon Levy Foundation and are located at Lincoln Center.

In recent years, the archives has undertaken a digitization project to digitize all of its materials between 1943 and 1970 in a digital archive called "The International Era, 1943–1970."

== See also ==
- New York Philharmonic concert of April 6, 1962
- New York Philharmonic Young People's Concerts
- 2008 New York Philharmonic visit to North Korea
