= Emil Paur =

Austrian conductor

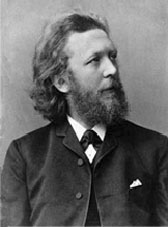
Emil Paur

Emil Paur (July 19, 1855 – June 7, 1932) was an Austrian-Romanian orchestra conductor.

== Biography ==
Paur was born in Czernowitz, Austrian Empire, now Chernivtsi, Ukraine, to a Romanian family, and trained in Vienna before working as a conductor in Kassel, Königsberg and Leipzig. He then emigrated to the United States where he led the Boston Symphony Orchestra from 1893 to 1898, New York Philharmonic from 1898 to 1902 and Pittsburgh Symphony from 1904 to 1910. He was married to pianist Maria Burger from 1862 until her death in 1899. After returning to Germany, he went on to conduct the Berlin State Opera. Paur was considered a serious conductor, favouring the works of Johannes Brahms, which were at the time considered heavy listening. He played both the violin and piano. He recorded 23 works on Welte-Mignon reproducing piano rolls.

Paur died in Místek, Czechoslovakia, now the Czech Republic.
