= Three Bs =

Phrase

"The Three Bs" generally refers to the supposed primacy of German composers Johann Sebastian Bach, Ludwig van Beethoven, and Johannes Brahms in classical music. It was derived from an expression coined by Peter Cornelius in 1854, which added Hector Berlioz as the third B to occupy the heights already occupied by Bach and Beethoven. Later in the century, conductor Hans von Bülow substituted Brahms for Berlioz.

== Origins ==
In an article in the Berliner Allgemeine Musikalische Zeitung in 1854, Cornelius introduced Berlioz as the third B, concluding his article with the cheer, "Bach, Beethoven, Berlioz!" Niccolò Paganini had even earlier (1838) identified Berlioz as the worthy successor of Beethoven. Hans von Bülow, two years before Cornelius' article, called Berlioz "the immediate and most energetic successor of Beethoven".

Decades later, Bülow composed the following pun to a friend: "Mein musikalisches Glaubensbekenntniss steht in Es dur, mit drei B-en in der Vorzeichnung: Bach, Beethoven, und Brahms!" B, in German, stands for the note B♭ as well as for the flat sign. The remark may be translated, roughly, as "My musical creed is in the key of E-flat major, and contains three Bs [flats] in its key signature: Bach, Beethoven, and Brahms!" Bülow had been attracted to the idea of a sort of Holy Trinity of classical music for a number of years, writing in the 1880s: "I believe in Bach, the Father, Beethoven, the Son, and Brahms, the Holy Ghost of music". He further linked Beethoven and Brahms by referring to the latter's First Symphony as Beethoven's Tenth (though Brahms disliked the comparison, thinking it implied plagiarism rather than the homage he had intended).

== Later developments ==
The lyricist Ira Gershwin suggested that the Three Bs should be expanded to five with the addition of Irving Berlin and Burt Bacharach.

In the 21st century, David Matthews suggested that if there was a "Fourth B" added to this legacy, it could be Benjamin Britten.

== In popular culture ==
- In a Peanuts strip (published February 22, 1952), when Schroeder is seen composing on the piano, Charlie Brown says "You've heard of Bach, Brahms, and Beethoven, right? Well from now on it's going to be Schubert, Schumann, and Schroeder."
