= Henry Christian Timm =

Henry Christian Timms
- Born: July 11, 1811; Hamburg, France
- Died: September 5, 1895 (aged 84) New York City, New York, U.S.
- Genres: classical, chamber music
- Instruments: Piano, organ

Henry Christian Timm (July 11, 1811 – September 5, 1895) was a German-born American pianist, conductor, and composer.

== Biography ==
Timm was born in Hamburg. He worked in New York City as a concert pianist, teacher, organist, and chamber musician. He also helped conduct the New York Philharmonic and served as the president of the city's Philharmonic Society from 1847 to 1864. He composed a Great Mass and many part songs, besides transcribing the works of other composers into versions for two pianos. He died in New York.
