= Ebersbach (Döbeln) =

- Ortsteil of Döbeln
- Interactive map of Ebersbach
- Location within Germany Location within Saxony
- Coordinates: 51°6′7″N 13°6′7″E
- Country: Germany
- State: Saxony
- District: Mittelsachsen
- Town: Döbeln
- Subdivisions: 4

Area
  - Total: 6.75 km^{2} (2.61 sq mi)
- Elevation: 237 m (778 ft)

Population (2010-12-31)
  - Total: 1,055
  - Density: 156/km^{2} (405/sq mi)
- Time zone: UTC+01:00 (CET)
  - Summer (DST): UTC+02:00 (CEST)
- Postal codes: 04720
- Dialling codes: 03431
- Vehicle registration: FG

Ebersbach (German pronunciation: [ˈeːbɐsbax]) is a village and a former municipality in the district of Mittelsachsen, in Saxony, Germany. Since 1 July 2011, it is part of the town Döbeln.
