= Symphony No. 1 (Brahms) =

Symphony by Johannes Brahms

- by Johannes Brahms
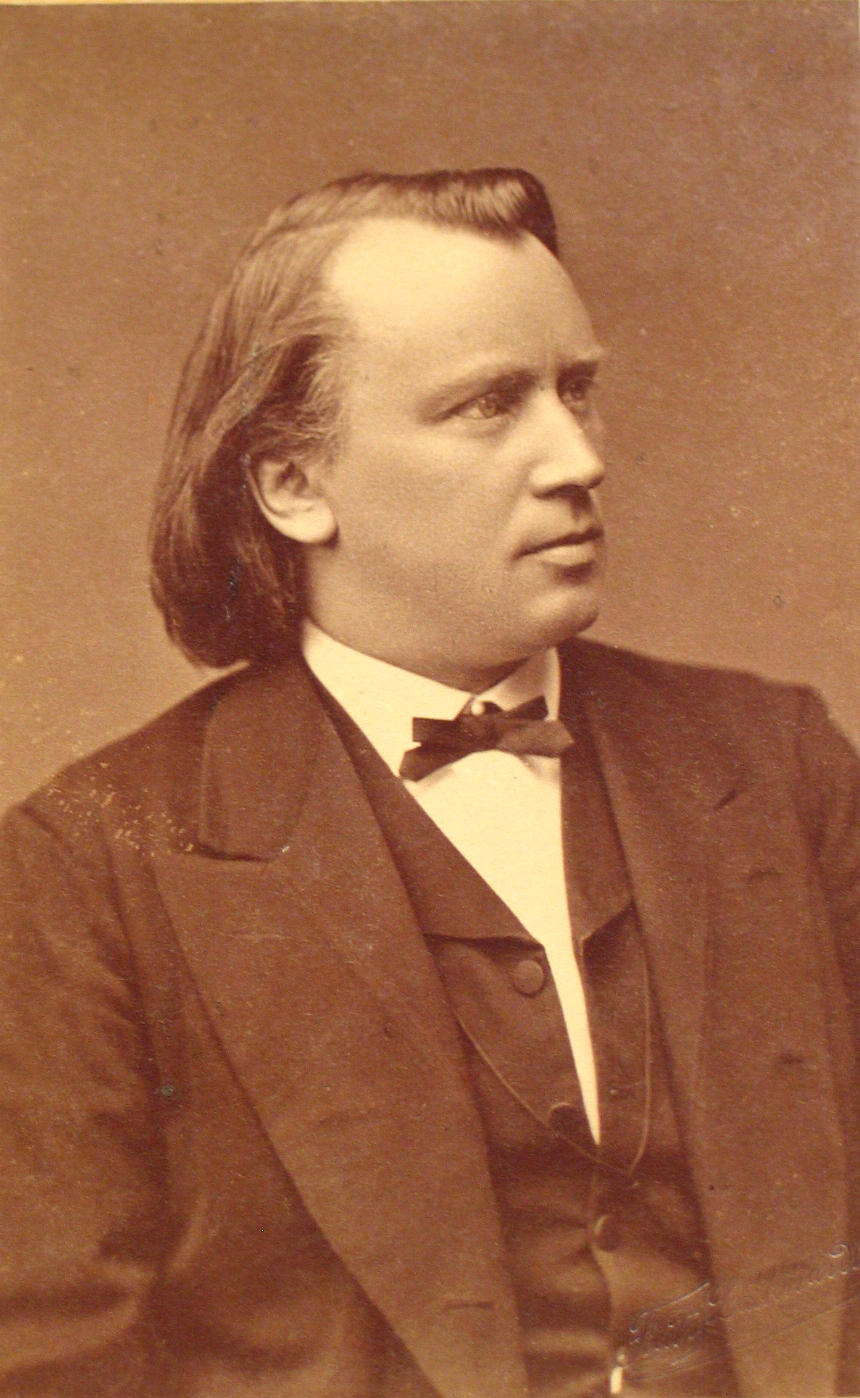
- Brahms in 1876
- Key: C minor
- Opus: 68
- Composed: 1855–1876
- Duration: c. 45 minutes
- Movements: 4
- Scoring: Orchestra

Premiere
- Date: 4 November 1876
- Location: Karlsruhe
- Conductor: Felix Otto Dessoff

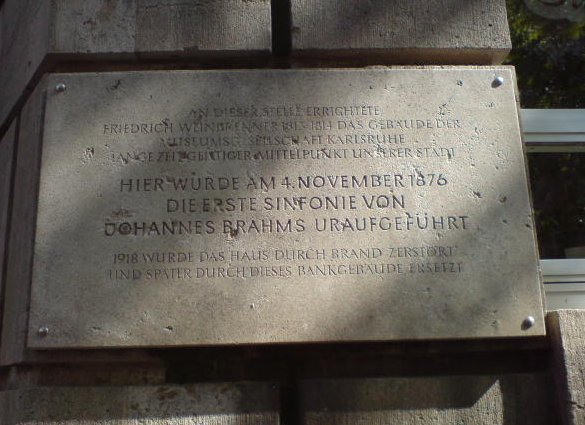
Commemorative plaque at the site of the premiere in Karlsruhe, Germany. The plaque reads: "In 1813-1814, Friedrich Weinbrenner erected the building of Karlsruhe Museum Society on this site. For a long time it was the intellectual center of our city. On 4 November 1876, The First Symphony of Johannes Brahms was premiered here. This building was destroyed by fire in 1918, and later replaced by this bank building."

The Symphony No. 1 in C minor, Op. 68, is a symphony written by Johannes Brahms. Brahms spent at least fourteen years completing this work, whose sketches date from 1854. Brahms himself declared that the symphony, from sketches to finishing touches, took 21 years, from 1855 to 1876. The premiere of this symphony, conducted by the composer's friend Felix Otto Dessoff, occurred on 4 November 1876, in Karlsruhe, then in the Grand Duchy of Baden. A typical performance lasts roughly between 45 and 50 minutes.

== History ==
Brahms began composing a D minor symphony in 1854, but this work underwent radical change before much of it was finally recast as his first Piano Concerto, also in D minor. The long gestation of the C minor Symphony which would eventually be his first may be attributed to two factors. First, Brahms's self-critical fastidiousness led him to destroy many of his early works. Second, there was an expectation from Brahms's friends and the public that he would continue "Beethoven's inheritance" and produce a symphony of commensurate dignity and intellectual scope – an expectation that Brahms felt he could not fulfill easily in view of the monumental reputation of Beethoven.

It was probably 1868 when Brahms finally realized what would become the final structure of his First Symphony. In September of that year, he sent a card to his lifelong friend Clara Schumann sketching the Alphorn tune which would emerge in the symphony's Finale, along with the famous message "Thus blew the shepherd's horn today!" Despite the evidence of the work's development, the symphony would not premiere for eight more years, in 1876.

Fritz Simrock, Brahms's friend and publisher, did not receive the score until after the work had been performed in three cities – and Brahms still wished trial performances in at least three more.

The autograph manuscript of the second, third, and fourth movements is held by the Morgan Library & Museum in New York City (the manuscript to the first movement apparently has not survived). It has been reproduced in miniature facsimile by Dover Publications.

== Instrumentation ==
I. Un poco sostenuto — Allegro

II. Andante sostenuto

III. Un poco allegretto e grazioso

IV. Adagio — Più andante — Allegro non troppo, ma con brio

The symphony is scored for two flutes, two oboes, two clarinets, two bassoons, contrabassoon, four horns, two trumpets, three trombones (fourth movement only), timpani and the string section.

Although Brahms commonly specified "natural" (valveless) horn tunings in his compositions (e.g., Horn in E in the second movement of this symphony), performances are typically delivered on modern valved horns.

== Form ==
The symphony is in four movements, marked as follows:

1. Un poco sostenuto — Allegro – Meno allegro (C minor, ending in C major)
2. Andante sostenuto (E major)
3. Un poco allegretto e grazioso (A♭ major)
4. Adagio — Più andante — Allegro non troppo, ma con brio – Più allegro (C minor – C major)

=== I. Un poco sostenuto — Allegro ===
The first movement is in sonata form with an extended introduction, featuring a drawn-out and highly elaborated variation of the movement's theme.

==== Introduction ====
Unique among Brahms symphonies, the First Symphony is ushered in via a formal introduction (an 1862 score of the symphony originally started with the second, Allegro, section). After a processional "poco sostenuto" opening section featuring chaotic syncopated rhythms underpinned by pulsating timpani, the woodwinds and pizzicato strings play with thematic phrases to be fully explored in the following exposition. A short and stormy return to the original development, this time in the dominant of G and supported by rolling timpani, is finally followed by further melodic introductions played by oboe, flute and cellos before resolving in a drawn-out 9/8 transitional passage ending with a plucked G note in the cellos.

==== Exposition ====
The exposition begins abruptly, echoing the introduction's plucked final note with an orchestral exclamation, followed by a short motto which leads to the main theme, which is initially played, stridently, by the violins. The overall mood is "savagely energetic" and "scherzo-like" in 6/8 time. As the responsibility for the main theme shifts from the violins to the woodwinds, the strings and timpani begin to sound out a da-da-da-DUM rhythm which is strongly reminiscent of the "fate" motif of Beethoven's Fifth Symphony.

An extended transition leads to the arrival of the key of E♭ major which in turn introduces the flowing and heart-easing second theme. This theme, which is related to the motto used to open the movement, is carried out in the wind section, led by oboe and clarinet with support from the bassoon and eventually the French horns. Strong intervention from the violas ends this peaceful passage with a descending minor key sequence which opens to a new closing theme leading up to a final bombastic passage wrapping up the exposition, which is then repeated in full.

==== Development ====
The action in the development section begins with a full step descent into B major, and instability ensues as interplay between the "eroica" motif and phrases from the original theme are played off each other. A series of modulations, each seeming to lead further away from the tonic, eventually leads the path back to the recapitulation. Starting with a murky rumble in the basses, the music gathers strength with a thrilling set of arpeggios in the violins with support from the brass, which repeat the "eroica" motif with great alacrity. Finally, a "shocking digression" in the bass line leads to a modulation to F♯, setting the stage for the recapitulation.

==== Recapitulation and coda ====
A somewhat nebulous start to the recapitulation is followed by a foreshortened restatement of the first theme, allowing the music to proceed in the tonic, rather than taking up the tonal progressions originally followed in the exposition. The coda begins with pizzicato strings which quickly decrescendo, leading to a set of modulations played out in the strings with their bows leading to the closing cadence. The movement ends peacefully in C major.

=== II. Andante sostenuto ===
The E major second movement is in modified ternary form (A–B–A'). Written in 3/4 time, it possesses a "profound, but essentially lyrical" character.

==== A Section ====
A rising, flowing theme is introduced by the strings, initially doubled by the first bassoon. The initial phrase is finished by a darker, falling dotted rhythm passage underpinned by low horns. A second phrase follows with syncopated interplay of the higher strings set against the low strings and woodwinds.

After a short transitional passage, the oboe introduces a rising, song-like theme which is initially accompanied only by the violas and the other winds. As the theme moves through a sweeping crescendo, the rest of the strings provide lush harmonic support. As before, this theme is ushered out with a somewhat darker, falling passage, which is resolved with a closing statement led by the strings.

==== B Section ====
Part I. A "lilting, leaping dotted rhythm" is introduced by the strings. As the theme rises, the violins and violas develop it further, before it turns downwards to be joined with the low strings. Eventually, the mood darkens into C♯ minor leading to the section's second part.

Part II. The oboe again emerges with a long, gentle solo in C♯ minor. It is again initially paired with delicate support from the strings. This time, however, the clarinet picks up the main theme as the mood brightens briefly. After a short while, supporting action from the woodwinds is joined by string accompaniment, but the woodwinds eventually drop out, leaving the strings to move to darker harmonic territory. Finally, the music moves into a softer, mysterious transitional session, leading to the final section.

==== A' Section ====
In a quasi-recapitulation, the winds enter brightly on a theme which is closely related to the movement's opening. After a series of passages which parallel—but do not echo—the opening A section, the principal violin enters with a rendition of the first oboe theme, this time with soft accompaniment from the horns.

==== Coda ====
Solo horn quotes the beginning of the movement's second "oboe" theme, which is subsequently elaborated by the principal violin in solo.

=== III. Un poco allegretto e grazioso ===
Like the second movement, the third movement is in ternary form. It is composed of the 2/4 Allegretto and contrasting 6/8 trio section, followed by a reprise of the Allegretto material and coda. A notable aspect of this movement is Brahms's careful attention to symmetry.

The form could be described as:

A B A_{1} B_{1} C D C_{1} D_{1} A_{2} – trio – A_{3} B_{2} A_{4} – coda

==== Allegretto ====
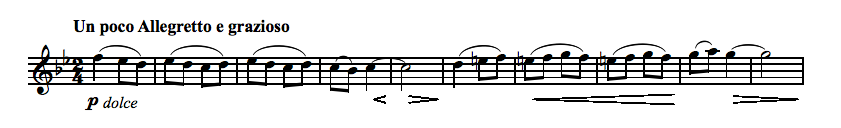
A theme as stated by the clarinet

The Allegretto is in the key of A♭ major and begins with a calm, stepwise melody in the clarinet. The four-bar figure is extended to an irregular five bars through a small bridge between the phrases by the strings. The clarinet rounds off the A theme in the Allegretto with an inversion of the first five bars heard.

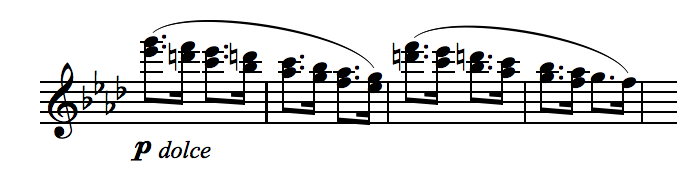
B theme as stated by the flutes

The B theme enters in measure 11 and features a descending dotted-eighth-note pattern in the flute, clarinet, and bassoon with the strings echoing the rhythm in rising and falling figures. After eight measures, A_{1} appears with the violins iterating the first theme and a longer, chromatic bridge section that extends the phrase structure to seven bars. B_{1} is presented with an extension into C.

The C and D themes differ from the first two in that they are shorter and more angular rhythmically. The A and B themes feature an almost constant eighth-note pizzicato in the strings, whereas C and D are more complex with an interlocking sixteenth-note pattern accompanying the winds. Movement from the major mode to F minor also marks these sections as apart from preceding material. This obvious contrast in character and mood can lend one to think of the C and D sections as a sort of trio within the first Allegretto section in the larger ternary form displayed by the movement as a whole. The symmetry within one section reflects the symmetry of the whole.

A_{2} closes off the first major section with the clarinet stating the first theme, much as it did in the beginning, finishing with a transition to the trio.

==== Trio ====
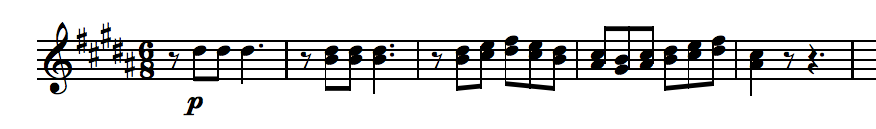
Trio theme

The Trio offers a change of key, as well as a change of time. The key moves to B major, an enharmonic minor third away from A♭. This key movement balances with the C and D sections in F minor, also a minor third away from the home key but in the opposite direction. The time signature changes from a stately 2/4 to a more pastoral and dancelike 6/8. The flute, oboe, and bassoon introduce a joyful melody in stepwise motion as in the A theme. The strings add a downward three-note arpeggio. These two motives make up the bulk of the trio material. Restatement and development of those themes ensue until the brass and winds join for a final repeat of the melody. The second ending brings the orchestra back into 2/4 time and to A_{3}.

==== Return of the Allegretto ====
A major difference between A_{3} and the earlier iterations of A is the lingering effect of the trio upon the movement. The monotone call from the opening of the trio melody appears over the clarinet melody in the flute, oboe, and bassoon. The rhythmic effect of triplets also invades the pure eighth-note world of the A theme, producing polyrhythms. Instead of the inversion of the theme we expect in the second phrase of A, the strings take over and offer an entirely different melody, but with essentially the same contour as the inversion. B_{2} occupies a significantly larger space of the reprise than it does in the previous Allegretto. It leads through an extended transition to the last, quiet statement of A in unison by the strings. Strings of dotted eighth notes end the movement proper with ideas from the B theme.

==== Coda ====
The entry to the coda is marked poco a poco più tranquillo and the movement ends with the gentle throbbing of triplets quoted from the trio section. The final few bars end somewhat abruptly with the downward arpeggio of the strings in the trio finishing on the downbeat of a new bar.

=== IV. Adagio — Più andante — Allegro non troppo, ma con brio — Più allegro ===
As with the first movement, Brahms begins the final movement with a formal introduction in C minor. The finale, noted for its "vast scope" resolves all the tensions that the first movement had raised but was (magnificently) unable to dissipate. Except for the cut-time Più allegro coda, the movement is in common meter.

==== Introduction (Adagio — Più andante) ====
Part I (Adagio – C minor). The extended introduction begins with a murky and ominous descending four-note sequence in the strings, which is followed by a tragically rendered "anticipation" of the movement's joyous 'Alphorn' theme. This is followed by a passage of pizzicato string notes, plucked in two-note groups passed between the high- and low-pitched instrument sections, which rises in tempo and volume until the prior tragic theme re-emerges in a short reprise. This is followed by a second passage of pizzicato strings, which is resolved in a sudden shift to a rising set of modulations in the woodwinds followed by a set of rapid arpeggios in the strings leading to the grand entrance of the Alphorn theme in C major.

Part II (Più andante – C major). The horns, including the first entry of the trombones, introduce the Alphorn theme with a "noble and grand presentation" over a "shimmering cloudscape" of strings, in "one of the classic orchestral moments of the nineteenth century". As the horns conclude the performance of the Alphorn tune, it is given to the flutes to recite. This leads to a mellow chorale in the brass, to be concluded with the transition to the exposition. The first three notes of the Alphorn theme create are presented in a swelling crescendo which resolves in a drawn out conclusion over pounding timpani followed by a quiet chord dying in the brass.

==== Exposition ====
The main theme commences immediately in C major, a "famous, grandly striding tune" which was likened by many to Beethoven's Ninth Symphony "Freude" theme; mainly because it was the "solitary one among hundreds...great enough to suggest the resemblance". This was an assertion which irritated Brahms, but which he nevertheless acknowledged—"any ass can see that". The theme is introduced in the violins and violas in alto register accompanied softly by horns and underpinned by pizzicato bass. After a few bars, the strings undulate through the second phrase with support from the bassoons. The woodwinds then pick up the song, with the strings in pizzicato accompaniment with gently trilling timpani. Finally, the full orchestra is unleashed in an energetic rendition which quickly fragments into transitional struggle. A passage led by arpeggio strings accompanied by bassoon and contrabassoon follows, including a brief variation of the Alphorn tune leading directly to the second theme.

The second theme arrives as a falling four note figure related to the opening sequence and related to the Alphorn tune. The theme is introduced softly in the low strings, and elaborated upon by the violins. The second statement of the theme is joined first by the bassoons, followed by the flutes and oboes. After an energetic transitional passage in the strings, the oboe continues with an inverted variation of the theme in G major but eventually modulates to E minor, leading to the conclusion of the exposition.

==== Development, recapitulation, and coda ====
The development and recapitulation sections start at the same time, beginning with a full restatement of the movement's main theme; the last time it will be heard in its entirety.

This return of the main theme is 'richly scored', with full strings carrying the tune supported by 'punctuating chords' in the winds and gently rolling timpani. The oboe leads a transition to E♭ and a development-heavy section marked by key instability and fragmented restatements and elaborations of phrases in the melody. These are parried between the winds, led by flutes, and (softly) by the horns and bassoons with pizzicato strings providing additional momentum. An energetic restatement of the theme by the orchestra follows, but this quickly digresses into a section marked by string arpeggios and the arrival of a new thematic element for further development.

A distinctive 'turning' motif, derived from the main theme, appears in the winds, traded between flute and oboe with lush string harmony accompaniment. This is followed by an energetic passage, mainly in the strings, featuring falling arpeggio figures and elements of the main theme recited in C minor/F minor.

The turning motif returns in a thrilling rendition led by the horns, followed by a nearly unrecognizable recapitulation of the first theme, with powerful syncopated descending figures which are traded between the strings and the wind instruments, over a bassline that is based on the "famous, grandly striding tune". This finally leads back to a rendition of the Alphorn theme, which begins tragically in the strings, but is recovered by a soothing harmonic motion initiated in the winds and followed by a major key restatement in the horns, this time without the shimmering strings of the introduction. The music begins to lose momentum as the strings play a descending procession that sounds as if it may lead to closing material for the section.

Instead, the second theme immediately follows in a full recapitulation in C major, which is restated with little change from its original appearance in the exposition. However, after the theme's restatement is complete, a subtle change in the final passage avoids the key modulation taken in the exposition section, which allows the recapitulation to end in C minor. A lengthy coda follows without pause, which returns to C major, restates the chorale from the introduction, and ends with a triumphant pair of plagal cadences.

== Reception ==
The value and importance of Brahms's achievements were recognized by Vienna's most powerful critic, the staunchly conservative Eduard Hanslick. The conductor Hans von Bülow was moved in 1877 to call the symphony "Beethoven's Tenth", due to perceived similarities between the work and various compositions of Beethoven. It is often remarked that there is a strong resemblance between the main theme of the finale of Brahms's First Symphony and the main theme of the finale of Beethoven's Ninth Symphony. Also, Brahms uses the rhythm of the "Eroica" motto from the opening of Beethoven's Third Symphony. The former comparison rather annoyed Brahms; he felt that it amounted to an accusation of plagiarism, whereas he saw his use of Beethoven's idiom in this symphony as an act of conscious homage. Brahms himself said, when comment was made on the similarity with Beethoven's Ninth, "any ass can see that". Nevertheless, this work is still sometimes referred to as "Beethoven's Tenth".

== Musical elements ==
The symphony begins with a broad introduction wherein three key elements are heard simultaneously: the low drumming, the rising figure in the strings, and the falling figure in the winds. This introduction was constructed after the remainder of the piece had been scored. The Allegro section of the movement is a large orchestral sonata, wherein musical ideas are stated, developed, and restated with altered relationships among them.

The second and third movements are lighter in tone and tension than the first and last movements. The slow movement, Andante sostenuto, exhibits gentle lyricism through three sections, the third of which is a new treatment of the themes from the first. The long violin solo is reminiscent of some of Beethoven's later works: the late quartets and Missa Solemnis. The third, scherzo-like movement, has an easy spirit yet is full of complex rhythms and interwoven textures.

The fourth movement begins with a slow introduction, where a new melody competes with "gloomy dramatic rhetoric". In the Più andante section, the horns and timpani introduce a tune that Brahms heard from an Alpine shepherd with the words, "High on the hill, deep in the dale, I send you a thousand greetings!" This movement contains melodies reminiscent of Beethoven's Ninth Symphony. The last section—Allegro non troppo, ma con brio—contains a grand melody in a major key, as the novel, Beethoven-like main subject of the grand finale (Think of Beethoven's Fifth Symphony, also starting in C minor and ending in the major).

== See also ==
- Symphony No. 3 (Beethoven)
