= Tony Bandmann =

- Born: 17 May 1848; Hamburg
- Died: 3 October 1907 (aged 59)
- Occupation: Pianist Painter Piano Teacher Theorist of piano technique

Tony Bandmann (17 May 1848 − 3 October 1907) was a German pianist, painter, piano teacher and theorist of piano technique.

== Life ==
Born in Hamburg, as a student of Ludwig Deppe, Bandmann was one of the first to have a clear theoretical understanding of the use of weight in piano technique. Since 1893, with a Study on tone formation and technique on the piano, she brought important reasons for the use of weight and the "shoulder-arm-hand chain" in tone formation, in contrast to the piano technique of the 19th century, which emerged from harpsichord playing and was based on "articulation" and "independence" of the fingers (described in the then famous piano school by Lebert and Stark). She collaborated with Friedrich Adolf Steinhausen, who wrote his fundamental work on the physiological principles of piano technique (1905) at her suggestion. She herself described the principles of weight technique in her 1907 treatise Die Gewichtstechnik des Klavierspiels, in whose introduction Steinhausen writes: "Bandmann's work forms the continuation and completion of my study".

Together with other pianists and piano pedagogues - mostly students of Deppe, such as Amy Fay, Elisabeth Caland, Hermann Klose and Horace F. Clark-Steiniger - Bandmann made a decisive contribution to the transformation of piano technique from the "finger technique" to the "weight technique": a transformation that took place at the end of the 19th century and the beginning of the 20th century and had its most important supporters (although often with the most different positions) in Rudolf Maria Breithaupt in Germany, Blanche Selva in France, Tobias Matthay in England and Bruno Mugellini in Italy.

Bandmann died in Hamburg at the age of 69.

== Work ==
- Tonbildung und Technik auf dem Klavier. Leipzig: Breitkopf & Härtel, 1893
- Die Gewichtstechnik des Klavierspiels, with an introduction by Friedrich Adolf Steinhausen, Leipzig: Breitkopf & Härtel, 1907 – (Digitalisat) – New edition Kessinger Pub Co 2010
- Die Erneuerung der Klaviertechnik nach Liszt. (p. 56)

== Literature ==
- Friedrich Adolf Steinhauses, Über die physiologischen Fehler und die Umgestaltung der Klaviertechnik. Leipzig: Breitkopf & Härtel 1905

== Secondary literature ==
Ydefeldt, Stefan, Die einfache runde Bewegung am Klavier: Bewegungsphilosophien um 1900 und ihre Auswirkungen auf die heutige Klaviermethodik, (2018) Augsburg: Wissner Verlag orig. Schwedisch, ISBN 978-3-95786-136-8
