= Theodore Thomas (conductor) =

German-American violinist, conductor and orchestrator (1835–1905)

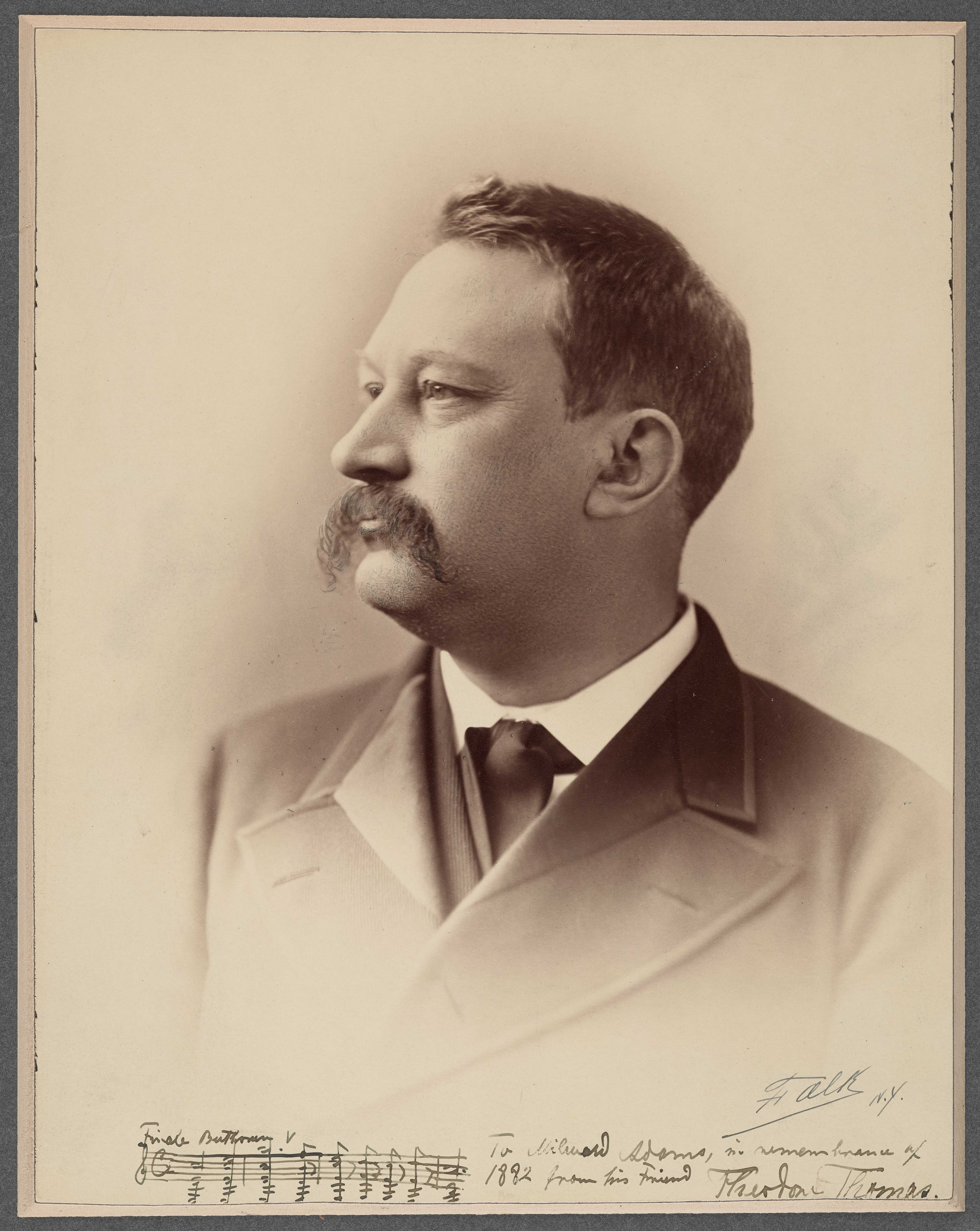
Photo of Thomas by Benjamin Falk, c. 1890 (Newberry Library, Chicago)

Theodore Thomas (October 11, 1835 – January 4, 1905) was a German-American violinist, conductor, and orchestrator. He is considered the first renowned American orchestral conductor and was the founder and first music director of the Chicago Symphony Orchestra (1891–1905).

== Biography ==
=== Early life ===
Theodore Christian Friedrich Thomas was born in Esens, Germany, on October 11, 1835, the son of Johann August Thomas. His mother, Sophia, was the daughter of a physician from Göttingen. He received his musical education principally from his father, who was a violinist of ability, and at the age of six years he played the violin in public concerts. His father was the town Stadtpfeifer (bandleader) who also arranged music for state occasions.

=== Career ===
Thomas showed interest in the violin at an early age, and by age ten, he was practically the breadwinner of the family, performing at weddings, balls, and even in taverns. By 1845, Johann Thomas and his family, convinced there was a better life for a respected musician in America, packed their belongings and made the six-week journey to New York City.

In 1848, Thomas and his father joined the Navy Band, but in 1849 his father ceased to support him, and he set out on his own. Thomas soon became a regular member of several pit orchestras, including the Park, the Bowery, and the Niblo. He then toured the United States performing violin recitals. During this time Thomas served as his own manager, ticket sales, and press agent. He reached as far south as Mississippi.

Thomas returned to New York in 1850, with the intent of returning to Germany for advanced musical education; instead, he began his studies conducting in New York with Karl Eckert and Louis Antoine Jullien. He became first violin in the orchestra that accompanied Jenny Lind in that year, Henrietta Sontag in 1852, and Giulia Grisi and Giuseppe Mario in 1854. Also in 1854, at the age of nineteen, he was invited to play with the Philharmonic Society's orchestra.

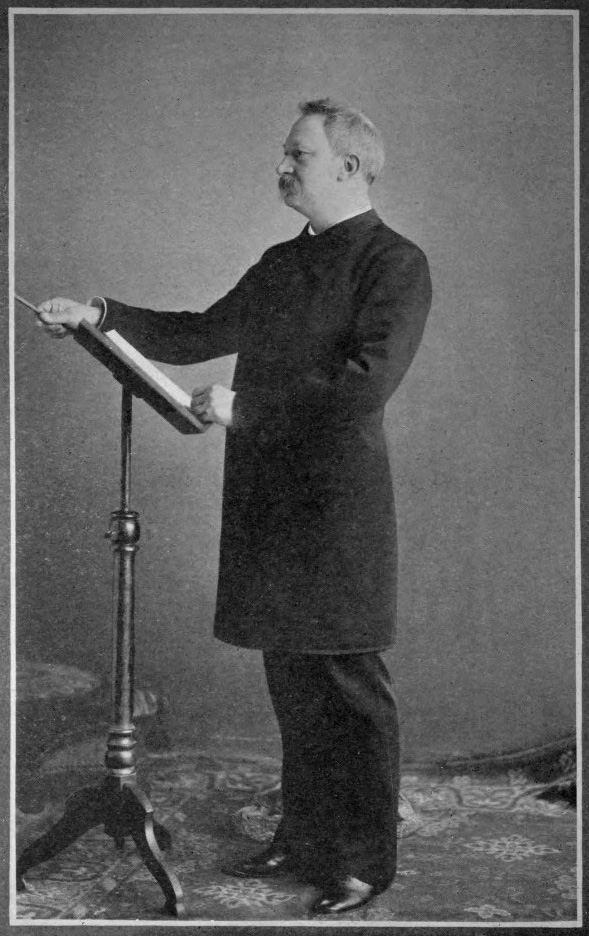

He led the orchestras that accompanied La Grange, Maria Piccolomini, and Thalberg through the country. Meanwhile, in 1855, with himself as first violin, Joseph Mosenthal, second violin, George Matzka, viola, Carl Bergmann, violoncello, and William Mason as pianist, he began a series of chamber music soirées which were given at Dodworth's Academy. The Mason-Thomas concerts lasted until his founding of the Theodore Thomas Orchestra in 1864. That orchestra would in turn have a chamber music connection of its own: Joseph Zoellner, who was at least for a time its concertmaster, later went on to form the Zoellner Quartet, another pioneering promoter of classical music in the United States.

In 1864, Thomas began a series of summer concerts with his orchestra, first in New York City, and later in Philadelphia, Cincinnati, St. Louis, Milwaukee, and eventually Chicago. The orchestra toured regularly and received consistent critical and popular acclaim, despite persistent financial setbacks. One such setback occurred on October 9, 1871, when he and his orchestra arrived in Chicago for a new concert series, where they learned large portions of the city were destroyed by fire the night before, including the Crosby Opera House where he was to perform. The orchestra was ultimately dissolved in 1888.

Thomas was also music director of the New York Philharmonic in 1877-78 and from 1879 to 1891; of the short-lived American Opera Company in New York in 1886; and of the Brooklyn Philharmonic Society 1862 to 1891. He was director of the Cincinnati College of Music from 1878 to 1879, and from 1873 to 1904 the conductor of the biennial May festivals at Cincinnati. In his Wagner concerts, Thomas used the Deutscher Liederkranz der Stadt New York choir, that he directed from 1882 to 1884 and from 1887 to 1888. To Theodore Thomas is largely due the popularization of Richard Wagner's works in America, and it was he who founded the Wagner union in 1872.

== Chicago Symphony Orchestra ==
Thomas always received an enthusiastic welcome in Chicago. In 1889, Charles Norman Fay, a Chicago businessman and devoted supporter of the Theodore Thomas Orchestra, encountered Thomas in New York and inquired whether he would come to Chicago if he was given a permanent orchestra. Thomas's legendary reply was, "I would go to hell if they gave me a permanent orchestra."

On December 17, 1890, the first meeting for incorporation of the Orchestral Association, organized by Fay, was held at the Chicago Club. Less than one year later on October 16 and 17, 1891, the first concerts of the Chicago Orchestra, led by Thomas, were given at the Auditorium Theatre. The concert included Wagner's Faust Overture, Tchaikovsky's Piano Concerto No. 1 with Rafael Joseffy, Beethoven's Symphony No. 5, and Dvořák's Hussite Overture.

During his tenure, Thomas introduced several new works to his Chicago audiences, including the United States premieres of works of Anton Bruckner, Dvořák, Edward Elgar, Alexander Glazunov, Edvard Grieg, Jules Massenet, Bedřich Smetana, Tchaikovsky, and his personal friend Richard Strauss who became the orchestra's first guest conductor, appearing with his wife Pauline de Ahna in April 1904 at Thomas's invitation.

During this time, he also conducted in other places. For example, on 19 February 1887 at the Metropolitan Opera House, New York, he conducted the U.S. premiere of Saint-Saëns's "Organ Symphony" (Symphony No. 3).

Thomas, who was never completely satisfied with the Auditorium Theatre (finding it far too cavernous and nearly impossible to sell over 4,200 tickets twice weekly), fully realized his dream of a permanent home, when Orchestra Hall, designed by the Chicago architect Daniel H. Burnham, was completed. Thomas led the dedicatory concert on December 14, 1904. He would only lead two weeks of subscription concerts in the new hall, after contracting influenza during rehearsals for the dedicatory concert. Though he continued with his customary vigor, he conducted his beloved Chicago Orchestra for the last time on Christmas Eve 1904 and died of pneumonia on January 4, 1905.

His post was assumed by Frederick Stock, who in 1905 wrote a symphonic poem Eines Menschenlebens Morgen, Mittag, und Abend, dedicated to "Theodore Thomas and the Members of the Chicago Orchestra." The work was first performed on April 7 and 8, 1905.

== Legacy ==
Music historian Judith Tick writes: "Theodore Thomas was a legend in his own time, and in 1927 the journalist Charles Edward Russell's biography of Theodore Thomas won the only Pulitzer Prize ever awarded for the biography of a musician." Thomas also makes a brief appearance as a character in Chapter VI of Willa Cather's The Song of the Lark (1915) in which he recounts some of the struggles of his early years and describes how listening to the singing of sopranos Jenny Lind and Henrietta Sontag influenced his violin playing:

He said he had spent the summer of his fifteenth year wandering about alone in the South, giving violin concerts in little towns. He traveled on horseback. When he came into a town, he went about all day tacking up posters announcing his concert in the evening. Before the concert, he stood at the door taking in the admission money until his audience had arrived, and then he went on the platform and played. It was a lazy, hand-to-mouth existence . . . and when he got back to New York in the fall, he was rather torpid . . . From this adolescent drowsiness the lad was awakened by two voices, by two women who sang in New York in 1851: Jenny Lind and Henrietta Sontag. They were the first great artists he had ever heard, and he never forgot his debt to them.

. . . . Night after night he went to hear them, striving to reproduce the quality of their tone upon his violin. From that time his idea about strings was completely changed, and on his violin he tried always for the singing, vibrating tone, instead of the loud and somewhat harsh tone then prevalent among even the best German violinists. In later years he often advised violinists to study singing, and singers to study violin. . . ." But, of course", he added, "the great thing I got from Lind and Sontag was the indefinite, not the definite, thing. For an impressionable boy, their inspiration was incalculable. They gave me my first feeling for the Italian style -- but I could never say how much they gave me. At that age, such influences are actually creative. I always think of my artistic consciousness as beginning then.

All his life Thomas did his best to repay what he felt he owed to the singer's art. No man could get such singing from choruses, and no man worked harder to raise the standard of singing in schools and churches and choral societies.

== Marriage and family ==
He married his first wife in 1864 in New York City, Minna L. Rhodes. She was a graduate and later a teacher at Miss Porter's School in Farmington, Connecticut. They met at a series of chamber concerts in Farmington, Connecticut. Thomas and Minna had five children: Franz Thomas, Marion Thomas, Herman Thomas, Hector W. Thomas and Mrs. D.N.B. Sturgis.

He married, his second wife in Chicago, Cook County, Illinois, at the Church of the Ascension on May 7, 1890. Rose Emily Fay was the daughter of Rev. Charles Fay, Harvard College 1829, an Episcopal priest and Emily Hopkins. She was born in 1853 in Burlington, Vermont, and died on April 19, 1929, at Cambridge, Massachusetts. She is buried next to her husband at Mount Auburn Cemetery, in Cambridge, Massachusetts.

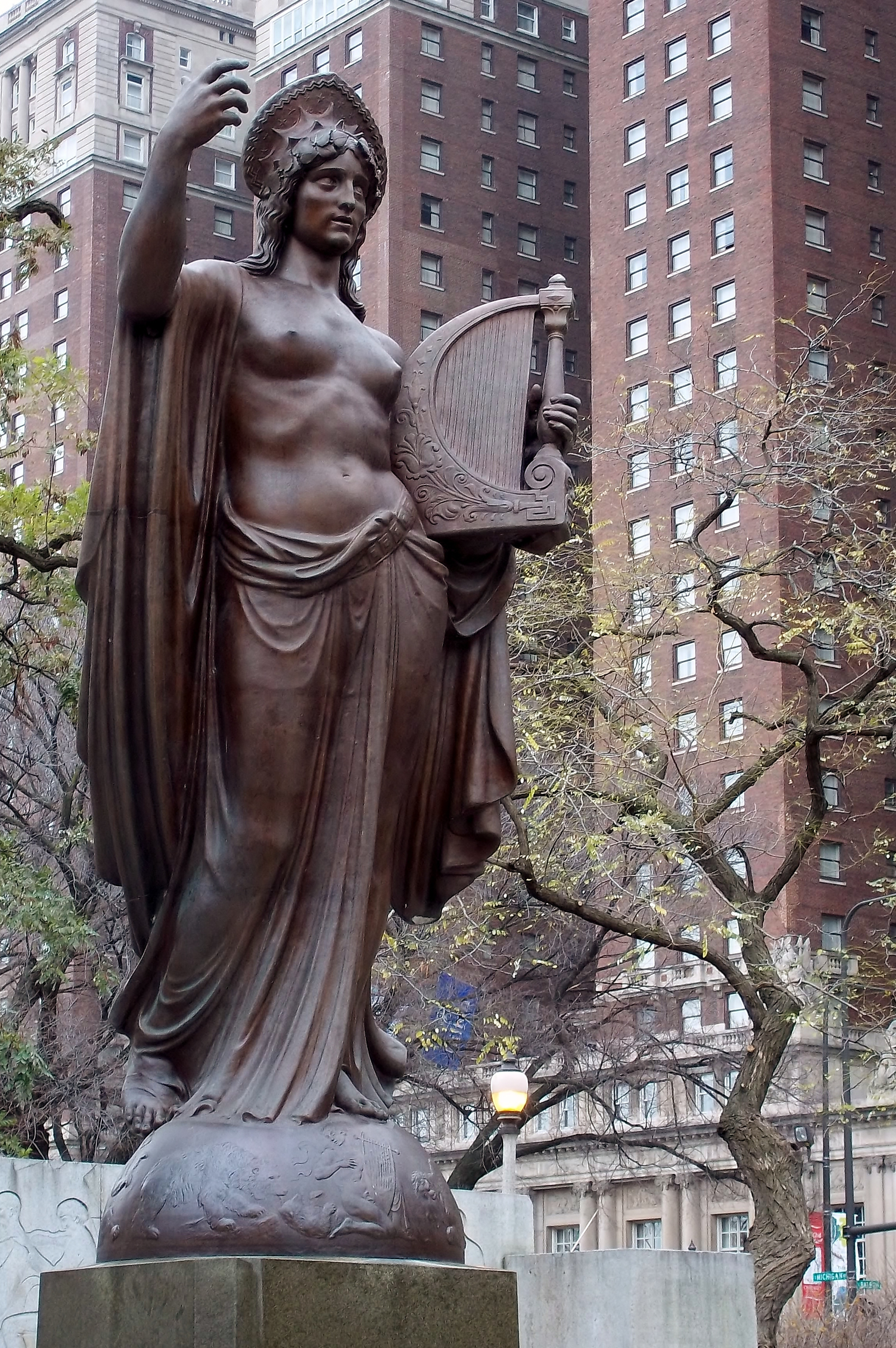
Spirit of Music, memorial to Thomas in Grant Park, Chicago

Rose was a gifted woman who contributed many of the critical notices published in the New York and Chicago Journals; Rose was well known in Chicago as a decorative artist. Her marriage was a society event. She was a sister of Amy Fay, (Note: Amelia Muller Fay, Born in 1844 in Bayou Goula, Louisiana, Amy Fay was the third of six daughters and the fifth of nine children of the Rev. Charles Fay and Emily (Hopkins) Fay of Louisiana and St. Albans, Vermont. She studied piano under Professor John Knowles Paine of Harvard and at the New England Conservatory of Music. From 1869 to 1875, she continued her lessons in Germany, where she studied with the most prominent teachers of Europe; pianists Carl Tausig, Theodor Kullak, Franz Liszt, and Deppe. Deppe's technique for piano revolutionized her playing and served as the method she herself was to use for her students in the years to come. On returning to Boston, AF became well known for her piano "conversions" recitals preceded by short lectures. She moved to Chicago and New York, where she was associated with the Women's Philharmonic Society of New York. She died on November 9, 1928.) a prominent pianist, and Harriet Melusina "Zina" Fay (Note: Born Harriet Melusina Fay, but called Zina, she was one of six daughters of Emily (Hopkins) and Reverend Charles Fay, a Bostonian who became the first Episcopal bishop of Vermont. Melusina married the philosopher and mathematician, Charles Peirce in 1863 after he received the first Bachelor of Science awarded at Harvard. (He had already received a Master of Arts from the college). The couple moved to a small house on Arrow Street. A Cambridge Historical Commission plaque marks the location of the house. She was a friend of Alice James and the Norton family, all of whom lived close by. During this period, Melusina explored the establishment of innovative communal kitchens and laundries with a small group of other Cambridge women. In a series of articles in the Atlantic Monthly (1868–1869), she suggested cooperative housekeeping as a prelude to cooperative retail selling by women, and recommended that the women who joined the cooperatives should be paid salaries to manage the business of obtaining goods, preparing meals, and hiring domestic help. She formed the Cooperative Housekeeping Association in 1870, but the experiment failed, when the members' husbands objected. In 1875, while in Europe with her husband, the marriage began to fail, and Melusina separated from him. He began to live openly with another woman, and the couple divorced in 1883. Melusina began to publish on various topics, emphasizing different aspects of cooperative living. Her first book, Co-operation (1876), envisaged wider communities that would include communal work areas. In 1884 she published Co-operative Housekeeping, subtitled, how not to do it and how to do it: a study in sociology. She had originally presented this material as a paper at the Illinois Social Science meeting in 1880, still promoting her dream of the 1860s and 1870s. By 1903, she had patented a design for a cooperative apartment building with communal kitchens. She died in 1923. Founder of the Cooperative Housekeeping Association an 1870 Experiment in Cooperative Living. References: Dolores Hayden, The Grand Domestic Revolution: A History of Feminist Designs for American Homes, Neighborhoods, and Cities (Cambridge: MIT Press, 1981); Norma P Atkinson. "An examination of the life and thought of Zina Fay Peirce an American reformer and feminist." (Ph.D. thesis, Ball State University, 1984).) who married in 1862, Charles Sanders Peirce, an American philosopher, logician, mathematician, and scientist. The philosopher Paul Weiss called Peirce "the most original and versatile of American philosophers and America's greatest logician". She was also the sister of businessman Charles Norman Fay, who was Thomas's chief booster and supporter in organizing a major Chicago orchestra. (Note: Charles Norman Fay, an 1869 graduate of Harvard University, and the oldest graduate of Harvard University to attend the commencement of 1943, died Friday at the age of 96 following a short illness. Born in Burlington, Vermont, Fay graduated from Harvard at the age of 21. He went into business and became head of the Remington-Sholes typewriter manufacturing company, one of the pioneer companies in America to turn out these machines. He was also president of the Chicago utilities companies. Besides writing several volumes on business and finance, Fay was a music lover and an ardent patron of the Chicago Symphony Orchestra when it was directed by Theodore Thomas. The last few years of his life were spent in Cambridge as a resident of Harvard Faculty Club.)

She was the granddaughter of John Henry Hopkins, who was the first bishop of the Episcopal Diocese of Vermont and was the eighth Presiding Bishop of the Episcopal Church in the United States of America. She was also the granddaughter of Samuel Prescott Phillips Fay (1778–1856). He was a Probate Judge for Middlesex County, Massachusetts, for 35 years and served on the Board of Overseers of Harvard College for 28 years. She was the great-great granddaughter of Dr. Abel Prescott, a physician in Concord, Massachusetts and the father of two American patriots who sounded the alarm on April 19, 1775.

Her first cousin was Harriet Eleanor Fay, the wife of Rev. James Smith Bush, an attorney and Episcopal priest and religious writer, and an ancestor of the Bush political family.

=== Death ===
He died at Chicago, Illinois, on January 4, 1905. His funeral service was held at St. James Episcopal Cathedral in Chicago and he was buried at Mount Auburn Cemetery in Cambridge, Massachusetts.

== Memorials ==
Thomas is honored with a memorial monument and garden in Chicago's Grant Park, near Orchestra Hall.

== See also ==
- Felsengarten, the summer house of Thomas and his second wife

== Sources ==
- Saffle, Michael (1998). Music and Culture in America, 1861–1918. New York and London: Garland Publishing. ISBN 0815321252.
- Chisholm, Hugh, ed. (1911). "Thomas, Theodore" . Encyclopædia Britannica. Vol. 26 (11th ed.). Cambridge University Press. pp. 867–868.
