= Friedrich Adolf Steinhausen =

German physician and physiologist

Friedrich Adolf Steinhausen (13 July 1859 − 23 July 1910) was a German medical doctor who was intensively involved with the physical conditions of making music.

== Life ==
Born in Potsdam, Kingdom of Prussia, Steinhausen studied medicine in Berlin and became chief physician and corps doctor of the XVI Corps (German Empire). Stations of his career were Hannover. (1903), Gdańsk (1907) and Metz (1908).

As a violinist by birth, he dealt with questions of music making and musicians' medicine at an early age and sought new, scientifically sound forms for the optimal handling of this instrument.His works on piano technique, which are still significant today, were created in collaboration with the pianist Tony Bandmann. (1848-1907) and were directed against the outdated ideas of regarding this as a pure "finger technique". Steinhausen's more complex, body-related view found numerous supporters, including the physiologist Otto Fischer. (1861-1916) and the piano teachers Ludwig Deppe (1828-1890), whose pupil Elisabeth Caland (1862-1929) and Rudolf Maria Breithaupt (1873-1945), even if they did not always share all of Steinhausen's views.

Steinhausen studied for years the movements of the violinists' shoulder and arm, also on the basis of his practice as an amateur of the instrument. In 1903 he published the fruit of his research in a book published in Leipzig: Die Physiologie der Bogenführung auf den Streich-Instrumenten (Physiology of the conduct of the bow on stringed instruments). Already in this study there are references to piano technique, to which he dedicated a specific and fundamental treatment in the volume Über die physiologischen Fehler und die Umgestaltung der Klaviertechnik (On Physiological Errors and the Transformation of Piano Technique), also published in Leipzig in 1905.

In the history of piano technique Steinhausen plays an essential role: he illustrated the physiological foundations of the modern "weight technique", which between the nineteenth and twentieth centuries replaced (or at least corrected) the traditional technique based on the "articulation of the fingers" and their "independence" (which was at the time the basis of all the "piano methods", such as the widespread one of Lebert and Stark). Steinhausen's work on piano technique was due to the insistence of the pianist (a pupil of Ludwig Deppe), teacher and painter, Tony Bandmann, who already in 1893 in a study on the formation of piano sound (Tonbildung und Technik auf dem Klavier) had stressed the importance of the use of weight and the "shoulder-arm-hand chain". Steinhausen exerted a great influence on numerous pianists, teachers and scholars of piano technique between the 19th and 20th centuries, among them Breithaupt.

== The Physiological Basics of the Weight Technique ==
The technique of the great pianists has very little to do, according to Steinhausen, with the technique that was then theorized in the "methods". The first, based on the use of "weight", is simply the "natural" or "physiological" technique, while the second, which considers the digital movement fundamental, constitutes an artificial and antiphysiological construction. The traditional digital technique aimed at the "articulation" and "independence" of the fingers is based on three erroneous assumptions: it misunderstands the organological characteristics of the piano, distorts the true nature of "exercise", understanding it as merely mechanical "gymnastics", and completely misunderstands the physiological movements that preside over the piano movements, identifying them with the only digital movement Leipzig, 1905, p. 81. In order to obtain from the piano all the rich range of sounds the instrument is capable of, it is necessary instead to use, as great pianists have always done and do, the great muscles of the arm and shoulder, which "occurs without stiffening anything, but in a state of relaxation and passivity of the muscles: The "mass", i.e. the shoulder-arm-hand-drop system, is in fact set in motion by fully exploiting gravity, i.e. the inertial weight ("fall"); the impulse is thus given by a movement of momentum ("Schwungbewegung") of the entire arm mass from the shoulder down; the muscular work (contraction) is therefore of very short duration, it simply gives the impulse and then immediately abandons the mass to its moments of inertia; before and after the impulse there is an identical state of passivity, relaxation and absence of contraction of all the muscles".

Playing in a natural way means "carrying" or "unloading" the weight on the fingertips which act as supports. The weight or the "load used in playing" (Spielbelastung) lies between the two purely theoretical boundaries of the "maximum load". (Maximalbelastung), in which all muscles work actively to unload the shoulder-arm-hand system downwards, and the "zero load" (Nullbelastung), in which the muscular work equal and contrary to the weight of the arm keeps the limb suspended without support and moves it upwards. The experienced pianist is able to use infinite degrees of "weight", dosing each time the amount of weight to be transferred to the fingertips in order to obtain the widest and richest range of sounds Leipzig, 1905, p. 83 ff.

It is therefore clear that the fingers do not have an independent function at all: they are, first of all, supports. However, in order to transfer the weight from one finger to the other, especially at speed, the forearm rotation must intervene in order to help the movement of momentum ("Schwungbewegung"). Understanding the essential function of forearm rotation "sweeps away all false precepts about the "articulation" of isolated fingers and the consequent myths of "independence" and "equality" of the fingers. In reality the articulation of the isolated fingers is physiologically impossible; the fingers behave not as hammers, but as spokes of a wheel rotating around the axis of rotation constituted by the elbow-wrist line, so their agility on the fingerboard depends only on the rotation movement of the forearm", they are fingertip-rotation "on which the mass of the arm momentarily rests and then discharges again into the momentum (Schwung)", Leipzig, 1905, p. 97.

Steinhausen died in Boppard at the age of 51.

== Work ==
- Studien über Schultergelenkbewegungen, in Archiv für Anatomie und Physiologie, 1899
- Die Physiologie der Bogenführung auf den Streich-Instrumenten. Leipzig 1903 – 4th ed. by Arnold Schering, 1920
- Die Gesetze der Bogenführung auf den Streichinstrumenten, in Die Musik, Jg. 3.4 (volume 12), Erstes Septemberheft 1903, pp. 350–354 (Digitalisat)
- Die physiologischen Grundlagen der musikinstrumentalen Technik. in Die Musik, 1904
- Die physiologischen Fehler und die Umgestaltung der Klaviertechnik., Leipzig: Breitkopf & Härtel, 1905 – 2nd edition by Ludwig Riemann, 1913 (Digitalisat)
- Ueber Zitterbewegungen in der instrumentalen Technik. in Der Klavier-Lehrer, Vol. 28, No. 11 of June 1, 1905, pp. 167–169 (Digitalisat)
- Introduction, in Tony Bandmann, Die Gewichtstechnik des Klavierspiels. Leipzig: Breitkopf & Härtel, 1907, pp. 1–10 (Digitalisat)
- Nervensystem und Insolation, Entwurf einer klinischen Pathologie der kalorischen Erkrankungen. Berlin: Hirschwald, 1910

== Literature ==
- Hugo Riemann's Musik-Lexikon, 10th edition, edited by Alfred Einstein, Berlin: Max Hesse, 1922, p. 1240
- Mathias Matuschka, Die Erneuerung der Klaviertechnik nach Liszt, Munich: Katzbichler, 1987, p. 39ff.
