= Rose Fay Thomas =

American writer

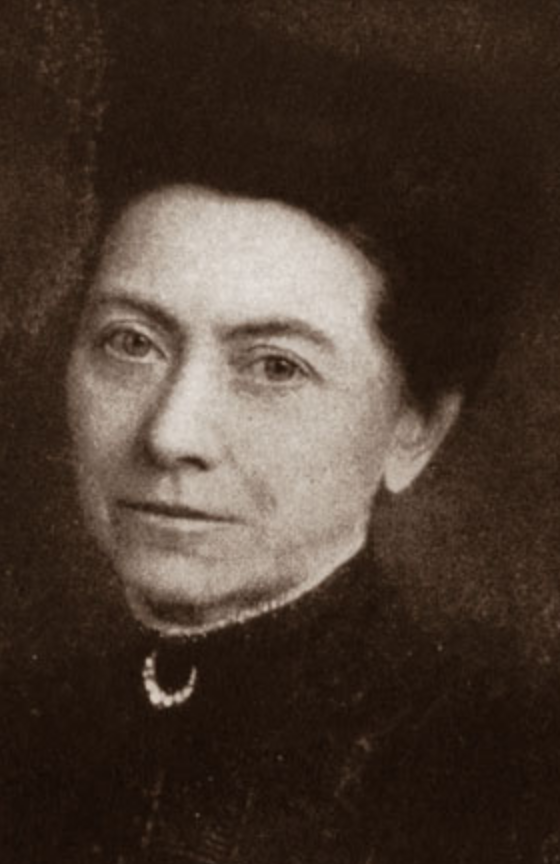
- Rose Fay Thomas, from a 1911 publication
- Born: Rose Emily Fay; September 4, 1852; St. Albans, Vermont
- Died: April 19, 1929 (age 76); Cambridge, Massachusetts
- Occupations: Writer, clubwoman, arts patron
- Spouse: Theodore Thomas
- Relatives: Amy Fay (sister); Melusina Fay Peirce (sister); Charles Jerome Hopkins (uncle); Charles Sanders Peirce (brother-in-law); John Henry Hopkins (grandfather)

Rose Fay Thomas (September 4, 1852 – April 19, 1929) was an American writer and advocate for animals. She was also founder and first president of the National Federation of Music Clubs.

== Early life and education ==
Rose Emily Fay was born in St. Albans, Vermont, one of the nine children of Rev. Charles Hopkins Fay and Charlotte Emily Hopkins Fay. She was from a musical and intellectual family: her older sister Amy Fay was a noted pianist; another sister was Melusina Fay Peirce, a feminist writer and wife of scholar Charles Sanders Peirce. Her maternal uncles included journalist John Henry Hopkins Jr., and musician Charles Jerome Hopkins, and her grandfather was John Henry Hopkins, an Episcopal bishop.

== Career ==
Rose Fay moved to Chicago as a young woman, and lived there with her brother Charles Norman Fay until she married his friend, orchestra conductor Theodore Thomas, in 1890. While her husband was responsible for the musical programs at the World's Columbian Exposition in Chicago in 1893, she organized the National Federation of Music Clubs, and served as the organization's first president. After the Chicago World's Fair, the couple bought a farm in New Hampshire, and she took charge of the remodeling of the house and gardens, which she called "Felsengarten". She published a book about the experience, Our Mountain Garden (1904).

In Chicago in 1899, Thomas organized The Anti-Cruelty Society, against the abuse of animals; she was the society's first president. She argued with Jane Addams in a 1901 forum about the best way to protect young boys working as messengers in the city.

After her husband's death, she donated his extensive library of marked scores to the Newberry Library and the Chicago Orchestral Association, and edited his memoirs; they were published in 1911, and are considered a useful record of the founding of the Chicago Symphony Orchestra. In 1922, her seventieth birthday was marked with a celebration at the Ambassador Hotel in Los Angeles, hosted by the California Federation of Music Clubs.

== Publications ==
- Our Mountain Garden (1904, 1915)
- Memoirs of Theodore Thomas (1911)

== Personal life and legacy ==
Fay married conductor Theodore Thomas in 1890. Her husband died in 1905, and she died in 1929, at the age of 76, in Cambridge, Massachusetts. Her papers are part of the Theodore Thomas Papers at the Newberry Library.

The Anti-Cruelty Society offers membership in the Rose Fay Thomas Society to benefactors who include the society in their estate planning. The National Federation of Women's Clubs calls major donors "Rose Fay Thomas Fellows", in her memory. The Musicians Club of Women and the Chicago Symphony Orchestra offered a Rose Fay Thomas Award for winners of a competition for women instrumentalists. In 2016, Joan Bentley Hoffman gave a lecture on Rose Fay Thomas's life and work, at the Glessner House Museum.
