= Bandmann =

Bandmann is a surname. Notable people with this surname include:

- Daniel E. Bandmann (1837–1905), Shakespearean actor
- Tony Bandmann (1848–1907), German pianist, painter, piano teacher and theorist of piano technique
- Millicent Bandmann-Palmer (1845–1926), English actress
