= Spirit of Music (sculpture) =

Sculpture by Albin Polasek in Chicago, Illinois, U.S.

The Spirit of Music
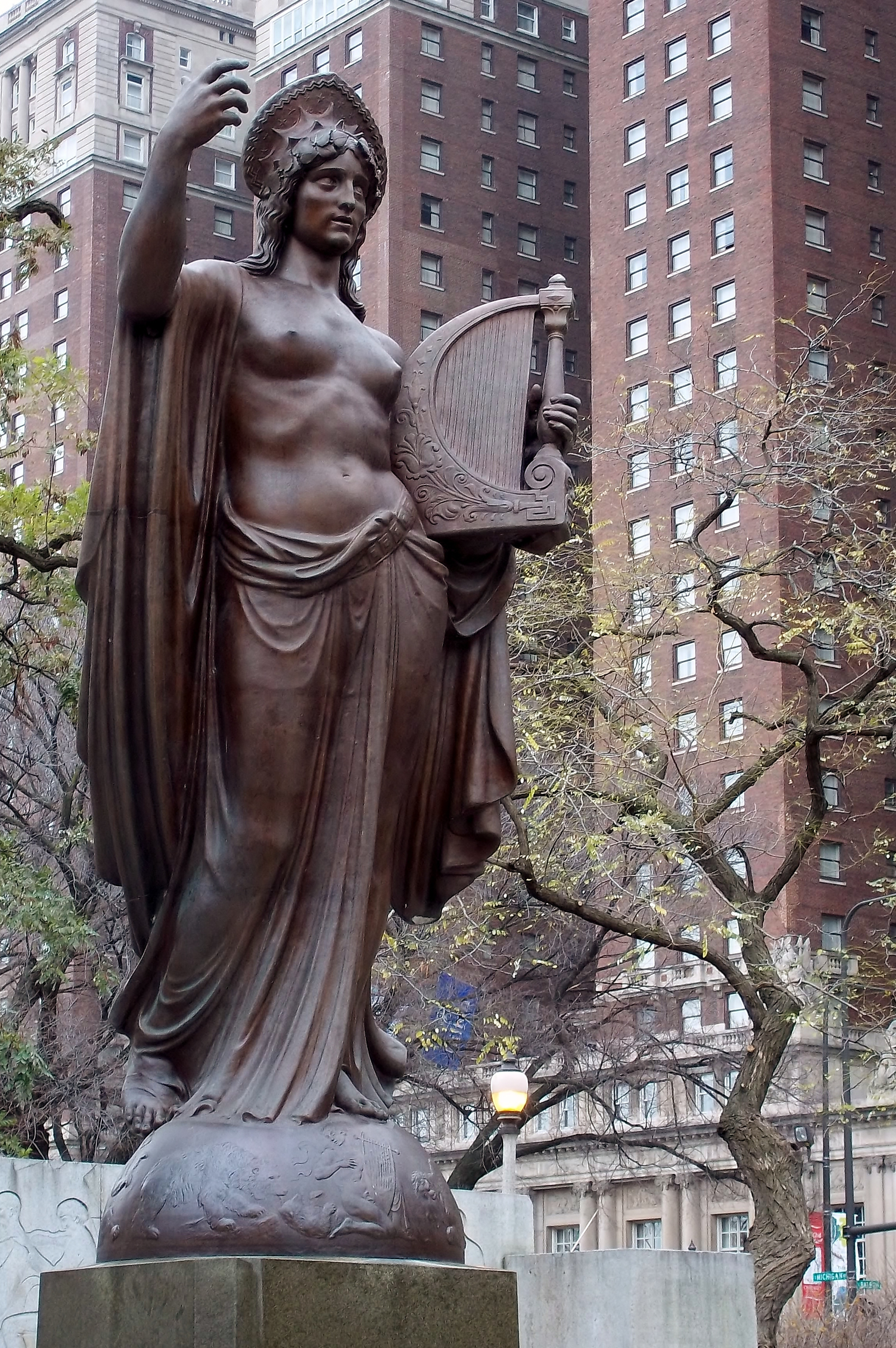
- The sculpture in 2010
- Artist: Albin Polasek
- Year: 1923
- Location: Chicago, Illinois, U.S.; 41.873415°N 87.623504°W

The Spirit of Music, also known as the Theodore Thomas Memorial, is an outdoor 1923 sculpture and monument commemorating Theodore Thomas (founder of the Chicago Symphony Orchestra) by Czech-American artist and educator Albin Polasek, installed in Chicago's Grant Park, in the U.S. state of Illinois.

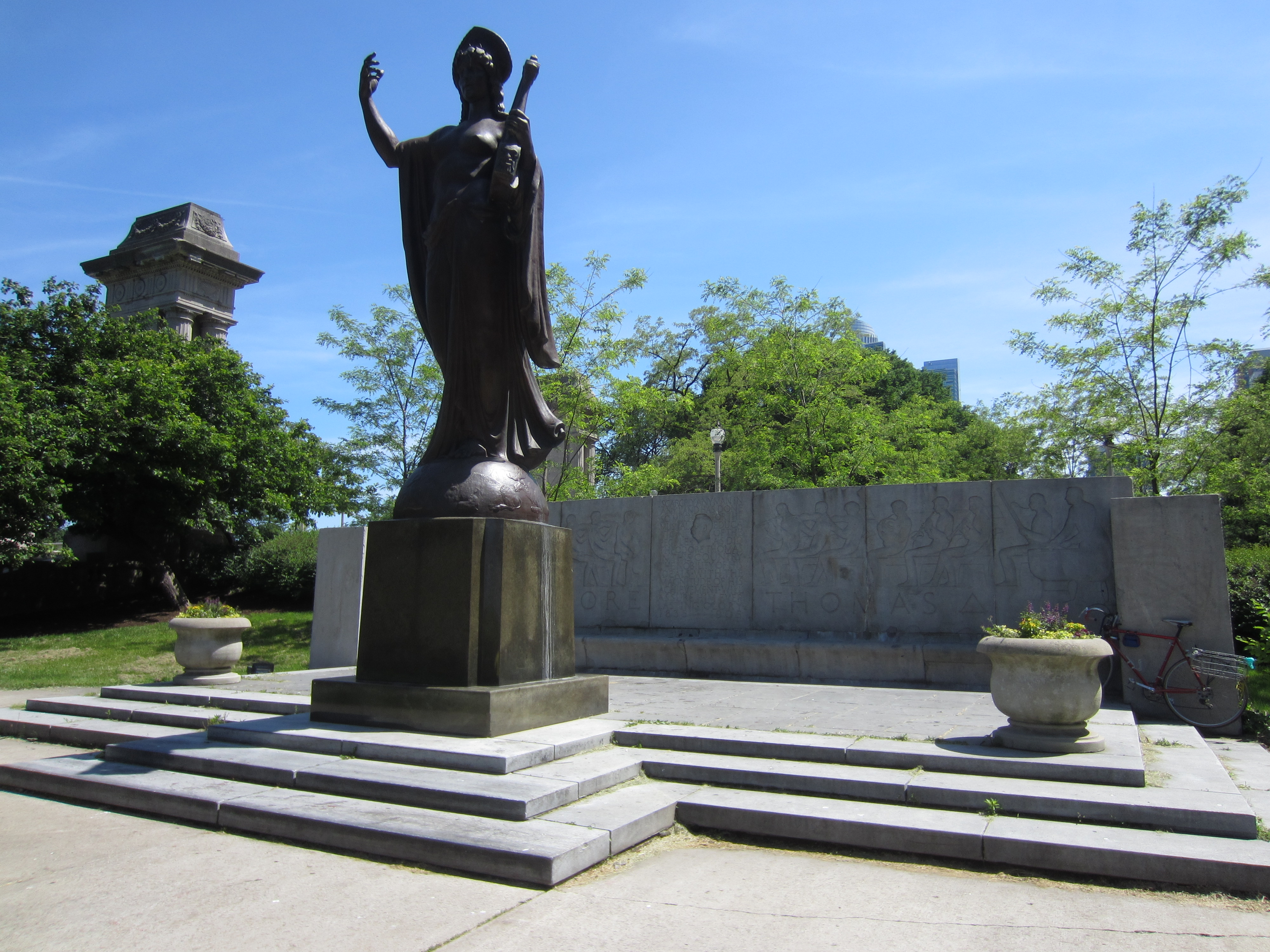
The monument in 2015

== See also ==
- 1923 in art
