= John Henry Hopkins =

Irish bishop

The Most Reverend John Henry Hopkins
- 8th Presiding Bishop of the Episcopal Church
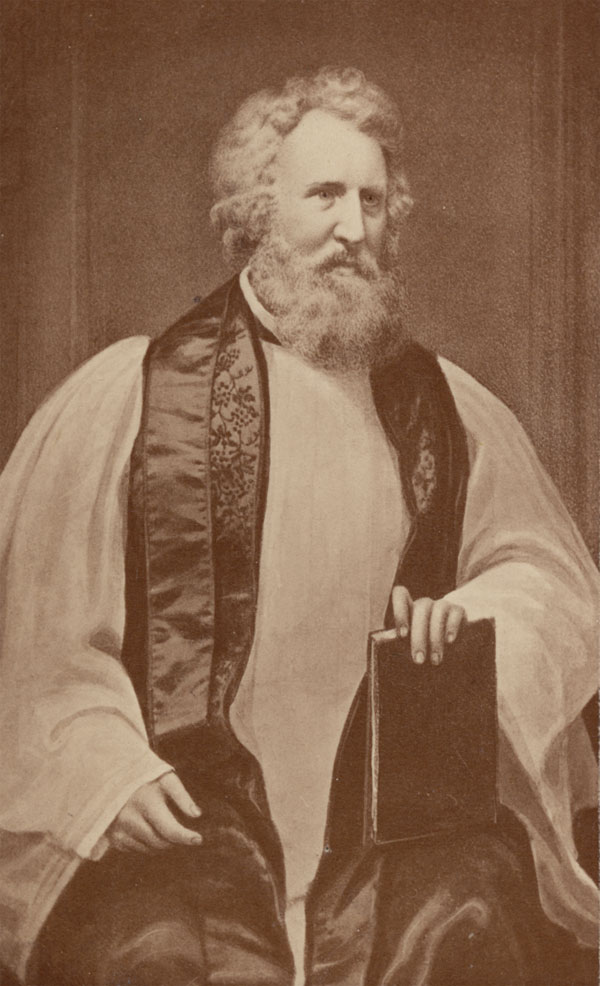
- Church: Episcopal Church
- In office: 1865–1868
- Predecessor: Thomas Church Brownell
- Successor: Benjamin B. Smith
- Other post: Bishop of Vermont (1832-1868)

Orders
- Ordination: May 12, 1824 by William White
- Consecration: October 31, 1832 by William White

Personal details
- Born: January 30, 1792 Dublin, Kingdom of Ireland
- Died: January 9, 1868 (aged 75) Burlington, Vermont, United States
- Denomination: Anglican
- Parents: Thomas Hopkins & Elizabeth Fitzakerly
- Spouse: Melusina Mueller
- Children: 14
- Signature: John Henry Hopkins's signature

John Henry Hopkins (January 30, 1792 – January 9, 1868) was the first bishop of Episcopal Diocese of Vermont and the eighth Presiding Bishop of the Episcopal Church in the United States of America. He was also an artist (in both watercolor and oils), a lawyer, an ironmonger, a musician and composer, a theologian, and an architect who introduced Gothic architecture into the United States.

== Early life and education ==
John Henry Hopkins was a descendant of the Hopkins family of England that was conspicuous in the reign of Richard II of England in the fourteenth century. In the reign of William III of England in the seventeenth century Isaac Hopkins was granted an estate in Ireland, where he married Mary Fitzgerald. From them the line of descent runs through the eldest son in two succeeding generations to Thomas Hopkins, who became a merchant in Dublin, Ireland, "dealing both in flour and linen." In April 1791 he married Elizabeth Fitzakerly, "a highly accomplished young bride of sixteen." John's mother was "a skilled musician," an artist with brush and pencil, and a reader of the best literature.

On January 30, 1792, John Henry Hopkins was born in Dublin, the son of Thomas and his wife Elizabeth. He was their only child.

After John was weaned he was sent to Athlone in Ireland to live with his paternal grandmother for several years. She instilled in her grandson the "lesson of daily private prayer," which he kept up the rest of his life. She also taught him to read the Bible, which he also continued the rest of his life.

After he returned to his parents, John's mother was his teacher. Before he was eight years old "he had read Shakespeare, Dryden, and Pope, besides any quantity of tales and romances." He was proficient in music, in French, and in drawing.

== Moving to Philadelphia ==
In 1801 the family emigrated from Dublin to Philadelphia, Pennsylvania. The passage across the Atlantic Ocean was "very long and stormy." At times everyone on board feared "total shipwreck." The little John "knelt down and prayed to God to deliver them out of their danger." A sailor saw him praying and told the captain, saying "the ship was safe" because "such a little angel was on board."

Neither parent was religious, but both valued education: Elizabeth Hopkins established a school for girls in Trenton, New Jersey, while continuing her son's education at home. That "education was the leading labor of her life" and "her chief joy." Eventually she sent her son to a Baptist school for boys in Bordentown, to prepare for Princeton University.

During Hopkins's school days Greek and Latin were favorite studies, and he made use of them in his later study of Patristics. His religious education was almost totally neglected. In his late teens, Hopkins read books by critics of Christianity, including Thomas Paine's The Age of Reason, Comte de Volney, David Hume, Victor de Riqueti, marquis de Mirabeau, Voltaire, and Jean-Jacques Rousseau. Additionally, he read Christian apologetics, such as Bishop Watson's Answer to Paine, William Paley's writings, and Charles Leslie's Short and Easy Method with the Deists. These writings convinced him that the balance of probabilities lay heavily with the Christian believers. Thus Hopkins adopted and "stoutly maintained" a Christian faith. However, there was no evidence that he would ever feel called to the ministry.

In his late teens Hopkins was one of the best violinists in Philadelphia and belonged to the best amateur orchestra in the city. He also learned to play the cello so that the orchestra, which was well supplied with violins, should have at least one cellist. For some years he was the only solo cellist in Philadelphia. In addition to music, Hopkins was skilled with his "brush and pencil."

Although they brought up their son in "an atmosphere of culture and refinement," Hopkins's parents did not connect themselves with a church until after their son was ordained.

== Early careers ==
Hopkins had four careers before he was ordained a priest in the Episcopal Church: working in a counting room, doing art work, working as an ironmaster, and practicing as a lawyer.

Counting-room
Hopkins's first career was working in a counting room. However, he did not like this work.

Artist
The young scholar found "a more congenial occupation in coloring the plates for the first volume of Alexander Wilson's Birds of America."

Ironmaster
At age sixteen, influenced by his Scottish friends, Hopkins decided to become an ironmaster. He spent the next three years studying books about foundry work, chemistry, and kindred subjects. He also worked for ironmasters in New Jersey and in Philadelphia. Westward expansion and the Embargo Act increased demand for American-made iron, and Hopkins, at the age of twenty-one, moved west to manage the ironworks at Bassenheim, Butler County, near Zelienople, at a salary of $1,000 a year. There he superintended the building and management of a smelting furnace. However, two years of hard and disappointing work convinced him he was not suited for the job. Hopkins then went into partnership with James O'Hara of Pittsburgh, an Irish immigrant who became the wealthiest man in Pittsburgh. Peace with England in 1815 seriously curtailed the iron business, and the partnership failed. O'Hara initially paid all the indebtedness, but over the years Hopkins repaid his half to O'Hara.

Lawyer
After the iron business failed, Hopkins and his wife moved to Pittsburgh, where he taught drawing and painting and his wife taught music. A trip to Greensburg to be a witness in a lawsuit revived Hopkins's interest in becoming a lawyer. In 1816 he borrowed Blackstone's Commentaries and other books from a Greensburg lawyer and studied them. He completed his studies in Pittsburgh, where he was admitted to the bar in April 1819. His law practice was soon the largest in Pittsburgh. Hopkins continued to practice until he gave it up in order to be ordained.

== Marriage ==
Hopkins did not encounter a girl who "enlisted his affections" until he met Melusina Mueller, a daughter of Casper Otto Mueller. Mueller had been a wealthy merchant in Hamburg, Germany until the upheavals caused by the Napoleonic wars caused him and his family to flee to America. They embarked on the last ship that left Hamburg before the great embargo, and landed in Baltimore, Maryland.

On October 28, 1814, the Casper Mueller family, which included Melusina, began a three-week journey from Baltimore to Harmony in Western Pennsylvania, where they built a log house. On the way they met Hopkins. After a brief conversation Hopkins said that he would "call on the ladies." He kept his word, and his courtship of Melusina began. The couple's shared appreciation of "music, art, and culture" brought them together.

On May 8, 1816, in Harmony, a Lutheran pastor, Johann C.G. Schweitzerbarth, united Hopkins and Melusina Mueller (1795–1884) in marriage, with family and a few friends in attendance. Hopkins is attributed to the gothic design of St. Paul Lutheran church in neighboring Zelienople, Pa. The Mueller family were founding members of this church. Hopkins brought Melusina and her sister Amelia back to Hermitage Furnace. Amelia Mueller lived with them and helped raise the children. The house in which the Hopkinses began their married life was "a log cabin of the better sort." There was a hall in the middle with a large room on either side and some smaller rooms to the rear, as well as an unfinished attic that Hopkins used as his workroom.

Hopkins and Melusina were married fifty-four years and had fourteen children, eleven of whom (three daughters and eight sons) survived to adulthood. The sons were pioneers in the ministry, education, music, medicine, insurance, and journalism, working in New York, Vermont, and San Francisco in the United States, and in South America. As of 1937 their descendants and connections totaled almost 150.

== Ministry as priest ==
In Philadelphia Hopkins attended Christ Church and St. Peter's, but there was nothing in either parish that interested him. Religion occupied only a minor part of his life. He was not confirmed until he lived in Pittsburgh. Hopkins's "religious awakening" happened during his first winter of work in the Ligonier Valley, during his association with James O'Hara. He was alone, reading a work of Hannah More, when, as Hopkins described it, "a sudden beam of divine Truth shone into his inmost heart." For the rest of his life "the love of Christ Crucified" was Hopkins's "guiding and ruling principle."

This "religious awakening" inspired Hopkins to provide "spiritual help to his workmen." There were no clergy or churches in the area, so Hopkins invited everyone to Sunday services he conducted in his own lodgings. He used the Book of Common Prayer of the Episcopal Church and read "the Bible to them, with portions of Scott's Commentary and such sermons as he could obtain, to which were added some simple exhortations of his own."

Trinity Church, Pittsburgh: 1823
In Pittsburgh Hopkins and his wife at first attended the Presbyterian Church, but he was invited to be the organist and choirmaster at Trinity Episcopal Church in Pittsburgh. It was not long before John Henry and Melusina began to receive communion.

Hopkins was soon elected to the vestry. In 1823, when a replacement for the rector could not be found, Hopkins was unanimously elected by the vestry as the rector (in absentia, since he was away at court). He considered the vestry's action "a call from above." He therefore closed his legal practice and applied for admission to Holy Orders. That move reduced his income to sixteen percent of what it had been when he was a lawyer.

Hopkins had been licensed by Bishop White, his bishop, as a lay reader, so he began to serve the parish in that role. He had already done serious study "in the field of religion," and he was "competent in the classical languages," so he "passed his examination for the diaconate in less than two months." In five more months he had qualified for the priesthood. He was ordained deacon on December 14, 1823, and priest on May 12, 1824.

Trinity was the only active parish of the church in the western half of Pennsylvania at the time. The number of communicants was about forty. The parish raised Hopkins's salary from $800 to $1,000, and then to $1,200 a year, but his rapidly growing family made a larger income necessary, so he started a day-school for both girls and boys. He himself led the classes in painting and drawing, and he composed much of the music taught in the school. From 1824 to 1830 he was also a professor of rhetoric and belles-lettres at the Western University of Pennsylvania, now known as the University of Pittsburgh.

In 1824, within a year of Hopkins's becoming rector, the vestry of Trinity Church had built a sanctuary to seat one thousand people. The number of communicants quadrupled, and at worship services the building was filled. Hopkins had studied Gothic architecture (Gothic Revival )sufficiently to design the new church building. He drew the plans for it and superintended its construction. Hopkins became "one of the leading authorities on Gothic architecture" in the United States.

The new church was consecrated by Bishop White. Hopkins also presented Bishop White a confirmation class of one hundred and fifty candidates. The parish was now the third largest in Pennsylvania, but the debt incurred in building the new church was not immediately paid. In the fall of 1825, therefore, the congregation prevailed upon Hopkins to visit churches back East. While he received warm welcomes there, he raised no money. That journey was still notable, for it involved a trip on the very new, 363-mile-long Erie Canal from Buffalo, New York, to Albany, New York. During the journey Hopkins drew thirty-seven watercolor and pencil sketches of the canal, its operation, and communities along the route. Hopkins's long-lost drawings of the canal were accidentally discovered in 2015 in the William L. Clements Library at the University of Michigan in Ann Arbor.

During his tenure at Trinity Church, Hopkins established eight Episcopal churches in the Pittsburgh area, including Christ Church in Meadville, Pennsylvania. When Hopkins established the church in Meadville he rode on horseback ninety miles from Pittsburgh through slush and snow. He remained there twelve days, during which time he preached eight times and baptized 32 adults and 243 children. The other foundations included:

- St. Peter's Episcopal Church in Butler, Pennsylvania
- Grace Episcopal Church in Mercer, Pennsylvania
- St. Paul's in Erie, Pennsylvania (now the cathedral church of the Episcopal Diocese of Northwestern Pennsylvania)
- St. Peter's Episcopal Church in Blairsville, Pennsylvania

In 1827 Hopkins could have been elected as coadjutor to Bishop White if he had voted for himself, but he refused to do so because, as he said later, in that case "he would have wondered for the rest of his life whether his will or God's had been done." In 1828 he was elected rector of St. Stephen's in New York, but he declined the election.

Hopkins recognized the need for a seminary in Pittsburgh. Travel to seminaries back east was costly in time and money. He believed that if the church were to grow in that area it must train up its own priests. However, Hopkins's project was not supported by the Pennsylvania Diocesan Convention. This made Hopkins accept an 1831 call to Boston as assistant minister of Trinity Church, Boston. The call included the stipulation that he would be able to start a seminary.

Hopkins had accomplished much at Trinity Church, Pittsburgh. A new church building had been completed and all of its 1,000 seats were rented. Only $1,000 of debt remained from the original cost of the building. The congregation was devoted to him and his leadership.

Trinity Church, Boston: 1831
Hopkins's Boston experience was "brief and troubled." His acceptance of the call had been based on "the promise of aid in the establishment of a school of theology" near Boston. In September 1831 a class of seminarians was formed at his residence, with himself, the bishop Alexander Viets Griswold, and two clergymen as teachers. He was to teach later in the Episcopal Divinity School in Cambridge, Massachusetts, but Hopkins's vision was to establish a diocesan seminary. Despite his hopes, the promise of a seminary contained in the call was not kept. Therefore, in May 1832 Hopkins accepted election as the first bishop of the newly formed Episcopal Diocese of Vermont.

== Bishop of Vermont ==
Vermont had been a part of the Episcopal Eastern Diocese, under Bishop Alexander Viets Griswold. Griswold was planned to make Vermont an independent diocese. Vermont at that time reported a population of 280,652. Within a year after Hopkins had arrived in Boston as assistant in Boston's Trinity parish, he was elected bishop by the first diocesan convention of Vermont on May 30, 1832. Hopkins accepted his election.

Hopkins was consecrated on October 31, 1832, in Saint Paul's Church, New York. He was consecrated with three other Bishops, namely, those of the Diocese of Ohio, the Diocese of New Jersey, and Diocese of Kentucky. Three weeks after his consecration, Hopkins and his family moved to Burlington, Vermont. He lived there until his death on January 9, 1868. Hopkins became the rector of St. Paul's Church, Burlington. Under his' leadership, the church grew, so three enlargements were required. As he had in Pittsburgh, Hopkins drew the plans and superintended the work. Hopkins retained the two positions of rector and bishop for twenty-seven years.

The thirteen parishes and missions which elected Hopkins as their bishop in 1832 offered him a salary of $500 a year, later raised to $1,200 a year.

Almost from the beginning of Vermont's history, younger Vermonters migrated farther west. From 1830 to 1840 the State's population had increased only about 11,000. This migration persisted during all the thirty-six years of Hopkins' episcopate, The 1860 census, the last one taken before his death in 1868, showed that the total increase of the whole of Vermont during the previous ten years, was only nine-hundred and ninety-six people. Some of the places where there were Episcopal Churches decreased in population. Active parishes would sometimes lose of fifty per cent of their communicants, thereby, reducing revenues and discouraging the remaining members.

On December 1, 1834, Hopkins started on a visitation, leaving his whole family in their usual good health. Eight days later, he returned home to find that typhoid fever had invaded his household. The only one who died during that grievous season was his third daughter, Melusina, in her eleventh year.

School for boys and financial ruin
Hopkins started a school for boys "as soon as possible." The school was successful from the first. It soon enrolled eighty boys, many coming from Canadian families. Before the spring of 1836, Hopkins had prepared plans for a "vast enlargement" of the school. When the plans were shown to his wife, "her heart misgave her." She implored her husband to be content with the building as it was or "to enlarge on a much more moderate scale." However, Hopkins refused to heed his wife's warning and ended up losing all his property. Hopkins borrowed the money at a bank on a note. The note's endorser was protected by a mortgage on every bit of land then owned by Hopkins in Vermont.

The new buildings were soon built, and they were "almost filled as soon as they were opened." However, in spite of the enlarged school's auspicious beginning, the Panic of 1837 wrecked the enterprise and left Hopkins "penniless." Hopkins decided to seek aid in Great Britain, but was only able to raise a bit more than four thousand dollars. This sum was wholly inadequate, and the school was abandoned. Hopkins had lost all his personal property. He was constrained to depend in part for his support upon the proceeds of lecturing. The indebtedness incurred in building a vastly enlarged school harassed him for many years.

After his fund-raising trip to Great Britain, Hopkins arrived in Burlington on July 3, 1834. He found out that his youngest child had been born while he was away. His wife had concealed from her husband that she was pregnant lest it should hinder Hopkins in his fund raising trip to Great Britain.

Before the end of 1834, a sheriff's sale was held on the premises. All the furniture needed in the school together with the Library and everything else was sold. The buildings were worth $40,000, and they were sold for a debt of $10,000. In May 1841, when the school became "finally and completely the property of others," a home for the Hopkins family in Burlington had to be found. The only building available at a rent within Hopkins' means was an aged frame-house so dilapidated that the Hopkins family was its last tenants. A permanent solution for housing came when "kind friends combined to purchase the lot of an hundred acres, which includes nearly the whole of Rock Point. The terms were that Hopkins should have a lease of the land for ten years, paying rent. He also had the right to fell the timber to pay for permanent improvements. The papers were executed on July 17, 1841. The work began at once, and on December 1, 1841 the new house was occupied.

Several years after 1841, there occurred one of the most humiliating experiences of Hopkins' life. He was invited to Boston for a series of lectures. While there, one of his former Burlington creditors had him arrested under a Massachusetts law. The original debt of $8,500 had been paid down until only $1,000 remained. Two friends furnished bail, so the creditor did not succeed in imprisoning Hopkins.

Retrospection in 1853

In 1853, improvement in the diocese had been so great that Hopkins gave a retrospective summary of the twenty years of his Episcopate.

- (1) The eleven clergymen whom he found in the Diocese on his arrival had been increased to twenty-five.
- (2) The sixteen Church buildings had become twenty-eight, besides two entirely rebuilt, one much enlarged, and many others greatly improved.
- (3) The one parsonage had become seven, with others in contemplation.
- (4) There had been 2,595 confirmations.
- (5) The property of the Church was generally free from debt.
- (6) Compared with the population, which had been nearly stationary, Vermont had no reason to be ashamed of her Church strength.
- (7) Hopkins then spoke of the divisions among the Clergy when he came. But now, there is no "bitterness or dissension."

Plan for reviving the Institute in 1854

Hopkins laid out a plan for reviving the institute before the Diocesan Convention in September 1854. Some of the church people of Burlington thought that their bishop's plan to revive the Institute would again lead to financial ruin. They thought that the kindest act they could do for their bishop would be to render impossible the execution of this new scheme. A paper was therefore prepared, and was passed round privately until it had received the signatures of 28 members of the parish. The paper embodied various reasons for a request with which they concluded:

- That sufficient reflection had not been given at the outset
- That the subscribers had not entertained the thought that it would be seriously undertaken
- That the times were so hard that they were unable to aid any new object
- That the enterprise could not obtain means enough anyhow to secure the object aimed at
- That they doubted the expediency of such an institution even if the money could be had
- That the parish yet owed $3,200 for the last improvements of the Church in the previous three years, and they could not pay that and aid the Institute plan at the same time.

They therefore closed with the request "that the Trustees surrender the subscription thus far made, to those who have subscribed it, and that they abandon all future efforts in the prosecution of the object."

In 1860, Hopkins accepted charge of Trinity Church, Rutland, and raised enough money to build a new church after his own plans. It was finished in 1865. He also drew the plans for the new church building for Thomas & Grace Episcopal Church in Brandon, Vermont.

On December 15, 1860, Hopkins received a written request from a number of personal friends in New York, that he would give them a brief statement of his views concerning the recognition of Slavery in the Bible, and the constitutional position of the two threatening parties in the country. Hopkins' views had been long and well known on this vexed subject of the Scriptural sanction of slavery. The pamphlet was completed on January 20, 1861, rushed through the press, and 20,000 copies circulated.

Retrospection in 1862
At the Diocesan Convention of 1862, thirty years since his episcopate began, Hopkins reported that the number of clergy in the diocese was greater than it had ever been before. There were also six candidates for Orders, a large number for such a small a diocese. The churches had attained a ratio of communicants to population, which placed the Diocese of Vermont ahead of the dioceses of Pennsylvania, Virginia, and Ohio, and nineteen other dioceses besides. He reported also, that while there were then twenty-seven states out of thirty-three superior to Vermont in population, there were only sixteen states which exceeded it in the number of communicants, and only seventeen outranked it in the number of the clergy.

=== Presiding Bishop, 1865 ===
On January 13, 1865, Hopkins became Presiding Bishop of the Episcopal Church by reason of the death of Bishop Thomas Church Brownell. He was next in seniority as a bishop. Hopkins served as Presiding Bishop until his death on January 9, 1868.

During the Civil War, Hopkins had the names of all the Southern bishops called at every vote taken in the House of Bishops. After the end of the War, as the Presiding Bishop, Hopkins played a large role in reuniting the Bishops of the Protestant Episcopal Church in the Confederate States of America with the United States Episcopal Church. At the General Convention of October 4–24, 1865 held in Philadelphia, Pennsylvania, Hopkins invited the Southern bishops and delegates to resume their seats in the General Convention. The invitation was accepted.

=== Lambeth Conference, 1867 ===
In 1867, when Hopkins received his invitation to the first Lambeth Conference of Bishops, he took the invitation to the Standing Committee of his diocese to ascertain whether the diocese would pay his expenses. A committee of five laymen was appointed to raise funds to defray the Bishop's expenses and more than enough was raised.

With funds to cover his expenses in hand, Hopkins attended the first Lambeth Conference of Bishops in 1867. The conference was convened upon invitation from the Archbishop of Canterbury. At the insistence of the other American bishops, Hopkins preached the opening sermon. Hopkins had suggested such a Conference to the Archbishop in 1851. During the Conference, he "took an active part in the deliberations." While in England, Hopkins was awarded the honorary degree of Doctor of Civil Law (D.C.L) by Oxford University.

Return home and death
When Hopkins returned home from the Lambeth Conference, he received a warm welcome by the clergy of the diocese at Burlington. On December 1, 1867, he preached for the last time in St. Paul's Church.

During Hopkin's absence at the Lambeth Conference, the enlargement of St. Paul's Church, Burlington had been made, and a new rector had been installed. Thus, Hopkins was relieved from parish work and enabled to spend more time on his episcopal work which included the diocese and the church at large.

On the third day after his return, a meeting of the leading churchmen in Burlington was held. There were two resolutions. One was that money could be raised to relieve Hopkins from pecuniary embarrassment. The other resolution was that Hopkins plan for a School was, "under all the circumstances, impracticable." Furthermore, they said that the diocese required Hopkins' entire episcopal services. If Hopkins agreed to devote himself entirely to his episcopal and parochial duties, his salary would be raised to $2,000. Hopkins closed the school and sent the remaining pupils home.

Although Hopkins was becoming infirm and in spite of opposition from his friends and family, he began making visitations before the end of 1867. At the request of the Bishop of New York, he made a visitation to Trinity Church, Plattsburgh, New York. It was here that Hopkins did his final celebration of Holy Communion, with sermon and Confirmation. The difficult journey to his home on the other side of Lake Champlain involved crossing Lake Champlain, and subjected him to heated railroad cars in Vermont and open sleigh rides in bitter cold. The resultant pneumonia laid Hopkins low on January 9, 1868. He died in the arms of his son Theodore. Theodore offered the Book of Common Prayer's commendatory prayer, (Note: Almighty God, with whom do live the spirits of just men made perfect, after they are delivered from their earthly prisons; we humbly commend the soul of this thy servant, our dear brother, into thy hands, as into the hands of a faithful Creator, and most merciful Saviour; most humbly beseeching thee, that it may be precious in thy sight. Wash it, we pray thee, in the blood of that immaculate Lamb, that was slain to take away the sins of the world; that whatsoever defilements it may have contracted in the midst of this miserable and naughty world, through the lust of the flesh, or the wiles of Satan, being purged and done away, it may be presented pure and without spot before thee. And teach us who survive, in this, and other like daily spectacles of mortality, to see how frail and uncertain our own condition is; and so to number our days, that we may seriously apply our hearts to that holy and heavenly wisdom, while we live here, which may in the end bring us to life everlasting, through the merits of Jesus Christ thine only Son our Lord. Amen.)

The four periods of Hopkin's episcopate

Hopkins' episcopate lasted for thirty-six years. It can be divided into four periods:

First period

- During the first five years, there was "prosperity, growth and promise" from 1832 to the "failure of the first Vermont Episcopal Institute in 1837," as a result of the financial Panic of 1837.

Second period

- The second period lasted from 1837 to 1854. The Rockpoint property was purchased, partly cleared, Bishop Hopkins' home was built, and farming was started.

Third period

The six-year third period was "a time of courageous and dogged resilience." It began with the sixty-two-year-old Hopkins going to Boston to give lectures and being arrested for a $1,000. debt incurred by the failure of first Vermont Episcopal Institute in 1837. He "earned money where he could" to raise the $1,000.

- He solicited contributions "to revive the Institute."
- He worked three months at the University of the South doing "landscape planning."
- He "served three days a week as rector of Trinity Church, Rutland, Vermont and he donated his "salary to the Institute."

Fourth period

The eight-year fourth period of Hopkins' episcopate was "a period of climax, success, large prominence and final benediction." This period encompassed Hopkins' 68th to 76th years.

- His "diocesan school for boys" prospered.
- His three daughters were "happily married," two to Episcopal priests.
- His eight sons were established in various occupations. Three were priests and five were engaged in "church journalism, fire and marine insurance, music, education, and bacteriology."
- His "international influence" was shown when the Archbishop of Canterbury took his suggestion and assembled the first Lambeth Conference in 1867. Hopkins attended. He died the following January.

== Funeral and burial ==
After Hopkins' return from the Lambeth Conference to Burlington in November, 1867, he lived only two months. He died of congestion of the lungs on January 9, 1868.

Funeral
After Hopkins died on January 9, 1868, there was as outflow of public sympathy. The story was carried by all the church papers, as well as the secular and sectarian press. Letters of consolation came from all kinds of persons, from the Archbishop of Canterbury down to the humble poor whom Hopkins had aided out of his own poverty. From Montreal to the uttermost parts of our own land, Churches were draped in mourning. Sermons and addresses were made about Hopkins. At some Altars, the Holy Sacrifice was offered on the day and at the hour of his burial.

Five bishops and fifty other clergy quickly came to St. Paul's Church, Burlington, for the burial. Not since Bishop White's episcopate had any Presiding Bishop gained such a high degree the affections of the Church.

On the evening of January 14, 1868, Hopkins' body was taken from the Episcopal residence and conveyed more than two miles to the church. It was accompanied "by a number of the Diocesan clergy." His body was placed in the tower porch. On the oaken coffin was a raised cross covering the whole lid. On Wednesday January 15, morning the outer door of the church was opened. For three hours there was "a constant stream of friends, high and low, rich and poor, one with another," who came to view the body. Then the lid was closed. The coffin was covered with a purple pall on which lay Hopkin's pastoral staff. It was wreathed with evergreen.

At noon, the procession of five bishops and nearly fifty surpliced clergy from eight dioceses moved down the broad alley of the church towards the porch. The Bishop of Quebec began the service. The body was placed in the midst of the choir, facing the altar. The Bishops of Quebec and Connecticut delivered addresses.

Burial
The day of the funeral was comparatively mild, but cloudy. A feathery snow was falling as the white-robed train passed on its winding way to the snow-clad cemetery. They were followed by a large crowd. At the grave, one of the younger clergy took up the Pastoral Staff, to be delivered to the next Bishop.

Monument
Hopkins is buried under a monument of an elaborate marble Celtic Cross in the cemetery at Rock Point, which lies near the Vermont Institute. Contributions to the amount of nearly $3,000 poured in from every State in the Union and from nearly every parish in Vermont for the monument. The monument was planned by John Henry Hopkins, Jr.

== Slavery ==
In 1861, Hopkins wrote his "most controversial" pamphlet, The Bible View of Slavery, in which he criticized abolitionists and declared that no scriptural basis for ending slavery existed. The pamphlet was seen as Hopkins' attempt to justify slavery based on the Bible. He argued that slavery was not a sin per se. Rather, Hopkins argued that slavery was an institution that was objectionable and should be abrogated by agreement, not by war. His only object was "to enable the truth to reach the minds of men."

In response to Hopkins' position, a letter was written by John R. Bolles criticizing Hopkins' justification of slavery. Bolles' letter against Hopkins gave a strong voice of reasoning to the anti-slavery movement.

Although Hopkins came under fire for his views on slavery in the North during the Civil War, he had a key role in uniting the northern and southern Episcopalians after hostilities ended.

A major example of Hopkins coming under fire was the "bitter attack upon him during the War signed by Alonzo Potter, the then Bishop of Pennsylvania, and 163 other clergy of the Diocese of Pennsylvania." In the attack, Hopkins was called "wicked," and his views were called "unworthy of any servant of Jesus Christ." Hopkins wrote a lengthy response to this criticism in which he defended his position.

Hopkins' views on slavery increased his popularity in the South, but it made for him many influential enemies in his diocese, in Philadelphia and throughout the North. Hopkins defended his position on slavery in the book A Scriptural, Ecclesiastical and Historical View of Slavery, from the Days of the Patriarch Abraham to the Nineteenth Century. The book "went through several editions." Nothing else that Hopkins ever wrote brought upon him such abuse. However, it is likely that his influence in preventing the Southern schism after the American Civil War was due to his avowal of the views defended in these forty-eight "Letters" to the Bishop of Pennsylvania.

In 1856, he is listed as a member of the Vermont chapter of the American Colonization Society, an organization dedicated to the emigration of free black Americans to the nation of Liberia.

== Family ==
On May 8, 1816, John Henry Hopkins married Melusina Mueller, daughter of Casper Otto Mueller, of Harmony, Pennsylvania They had 13 children. Eleven survived to adulthood.

The names of their children in order of birth were as follows:
1. Charlotte Emily (Mrs. Rev. Dr. Charles Fay).
Charlotte Emily Hopkins was a woman of unusual abilities and accomplishments. Besides being a skilled performer on the piano, organ, guitar, violin, flute, and harp, she was an accomplished needlewoman and a natural artist with pencil, pen and ink, and brush. She married at sixteen and became the mother of nine children. She died in 1856 at age thirty-nine." Her daughters included pianist Amy Fay, writer Melusina Fay Peirce, and writer Rose Fay Thomas.

2. Matilda Theresa (Mrs. Rev. Dr. Norman W. Camp)
Matilda Theresa was born on May 16, 1817, in Derby, Vermont. She died on November 10, 1898, in Maryland. Her husband Norman attended the University of Vermont, Class of 1837 where he earned a Doctor of Divinity degree and was ordained as an Episcopal minister in 1839. He served five churches. He served in the Civil War as a military Chaplain.

3. John Henry, Jr.
John Henry Hopkins, Jr., D.D. was born on October 28, 1820, in Pittsburgh, Pennsylvania. He graduated from the University of Vermont in 1839 and from the General Theological Seminary in New York city, in 1850. In 1872, he was ordained an Episcopal priest. In February 1853, he founded the Church Journal and was its editor and proprietor until May 1868. He was noted as a hymn writer. In 1867, he accompanied his father Bishop John Henry Hopkins to the Lambeth Conference. He was ordained priest in 1872. In that year, he became rector of Trinity Church, Plattsburg, New York. In 1873, he published The Life of his Father. In 1876, he became rector of Christ Church, Williamsport, Pennsylvania. In 1885, he delivered the eulogy at the Funeral of President Ulysses S. Grant in 1885. John Henry Hopkins, Jr. died on August 14, 1891, in Hudson, New York, and is buried with his father at Bishop's House, Rock Point.

4. Edward Augustus
Edward Augustus was born in Pittsburgh, Pennsylvania, on November 29, 1822. After studying for one year in the University of Vermont, then for a few months in Kenyon College, Ohio, he entered the navy as a midshipman. After five years he resigned, and was appointed special commissioner to report whether the republic of Paraguay was entitled to the recognition of her independence by the United States. On his favorable report, that independence was recognized, and he was sent as the first United States consul at Asunción, Paraguay, in 1853. He was at the same time general agent of an American company for manufacturing and mercantile purposes.

5. Melusina Elizabeth
On December 1, 1834, Hopkins started on a visitation, leaving his whole family in their usual good health. Eight days later, he returned home to find that typhoid fever had invaded his household. The only one who died during that grievous season was his third daughter, Melusina, in her eleventh year.

6. Casper Thomas
Caspar Thomas Hopkins was born on May 18, 1826, in Pittsburgh, Pennsylvania. He was not inclined to the ministry, He tried many occupations. Shortly after his graduation from the University of Vermont in 1847, he started a periodical called The Vermont State Agriculturalist. In 1849, he moved to California to mine for gold. In 1853, he married Almira Burtnett (1828–1875), and they had four children. Caspar finally settled on a career in marine and fire insurance. In 1861, he established the first insurance company on the Pacific coast and served as its president for 35 years until 1884, when he retired on account of impaired health. In addition to numerous magazine articles and pamphlets, he published a civics textbook entitled A Manual of American Ideas. Caspar Thomas Hopkins died on October 4, 1893, of an overdose of morphine which he was taking for pain.

7. Theodore Austin
Theodore attended a private school for boys his father had established in Burlington, Vermont. He graduated from the University of Vermont in 1850. He began working in the Episcopal Church, serving at St. Luke's church in St. Louis, then as principal of the Yeates Institute for boys in Lancaster, Pennsylvania. The Yeates Institute was established on August 18, 1857. It was liberally endowed by Miss Catharine Yeates in memory of her father Judge Yeates. In the summer of 1860, Theodore and his wife, Alice Leavenworth Doolittle Hopkins, moved back to Burlington where he held the position of principal of the Vermont Episcopal Institute. He held that position for 21 years before retiring in 1881.

8. Alfred Dreneas

9. Clement Eusebius
Clement Eusebius was born on January 18, 1832, in Cambridge, Massachusetts. For a time, he served as City Editor of the New York Evening Express. From 1853 to 1854, Hopkins served as the United States consular officials in Paraguay He married Frances Louisa Adams. He died of tuberculosis on June 14, 1862.

10. William Cyprian
William Cyprian was born in Burlington, Vermont, on April 28, 1834. He was an Episcopal Clergyman. He married Julia Gibson Hopkins. He died on January 7, 1910, in Toledo, Ohio.

11. Charles Jerome
Charles Jerome Hopkins was known intimately as "Charlie" and professionally as "Jerome." He was born April 4, 1836, in Burlington, Vermont. He soon developed a talent for music. Except for one year at the University of Vermont, he was educated at home. Hopkins became a well-known organist, composer, and musical educator and essayist. He married Sarah Lucinda Lee in 1869, who died October 23, 1876. They had no children.

Jerome lived and worked most of his life in New York, City. For five years, he was a professor at Cooper Union in New York City. He was, also, organist at St. Ann's Church, Brooklyn. Jerome served as editor of several music publications.

Jerome traveled throughout the United States. He gave concerts and lecture-concerts in one hundred and twelve cities. In 1866, he founded and maintained his New York Free Orpheon Choral School for Children. In 1867, he originated piano lecture-concerts for lyceums. He was the first musician in America who trained children to sing Handel's "Hallelujah Chorus."

In 1874, Jerome's orchestral music was played at The Crystal Palace in London. This was a first for an American musician. In 1885, his chamber music was played at Liszt's house in Weimar, Germany. In addition to songs, secular and sacred, two symphonies, and three operas, he has published First Book of Church Music (1860); a class-book of notation study (1865); and Second Book of Church Music (1867).

Hopkins' compositions include:

1. Samuel, an opera for children in 1877.
2. Dumb Love, an operetta in 1878.
3. Taffy and Old Munch, a children's comic operetta.
4. Festival Vespers, an Orchestral Vespers Service for boy's choir.
5. In 1876–77, two chorus choirs, one echo choir, soli, two organs, and harp obligato.
6. Andante grazioso in G, Adagio cantabile in D, Allegro moderato in A Siciliano in G, and other pianoforte music.

Jerome Hopkins died on November 4, 1898.

12. Caroline Amelia (Mrs. Thomas H. Canfield)
Caroline Amelia Hopkins Canfield, 1838–1907, married Thomas H. Canfield in 1860. Shortly after her father, John Henry Hopkins, Sr. died, Caroline ("Carrie") became the mistress of the family home at Rock Point, where she raised her family and entertained relatives and church figures. She was very involved in St. Paul's Episcopal Church in Burlington, as well as in diocesan activities, and served as the organist at St. Paul's for some time. She moved to Burlington in 1892. Caroline and Thomas had five children: Emily Canfield, born May 13, 1863; John Henry Hopkins Canfield, born January 21, 1868; Marion Canfield (Hadlock), born September 8, 1870; Flora Canfield (Camp), born January 11, 1873; and Thomas Hawley Canfield, Jr., born November 17, 1874.

13. Frederick Vincent
Frederick Vincent was a physician. He was born in Burlington, Vermont, on May 23, 1839. He graduated from the University of Vermont in 1859. He studied medicine. He was surgeon and professor of geology in Louisiana State University. He was put in charge of the geological survey of Louisiana from 1868 until 1874. He was surgeon to the New Almaden and Sulphur Bank quicksilver mine in 1876–82. He practised medicine in San Francisco. He has originated a method of killing the bacilli of tuberculosis and leprosy by half-inch sparks from a Kuhmkorff coil. In addition to articles published in newspapers, Hopkins wrote four reports on the "Geology of Louisiana" in the Reports of the Louisiana State University (Baton Rouge, 1870), and a report, in conjunction with Prof. Eugene W. Hilgard, on borings made by the engineer department of the U. S. army between the Mississippi River and Lake Borgne.

John and Melusina's golden wedding anniversary
In 1866, most of their family gathered at the family home at Rock Point to celebrate their golden wedding anniversary, and their daughter-in-law, Alice Leavenworth Doolittle, published a book to commemorate the event.

== Legacy ==
As a bishop, Hopkins is remembered as giving himself fully to his work. He "labored earnestly and successfully in the formation of new parishes and in supplying them with clergy." A 1932 The Burlington Free Press newspaper remembered Hopkins as a man of "tremendous energy and great versatility."

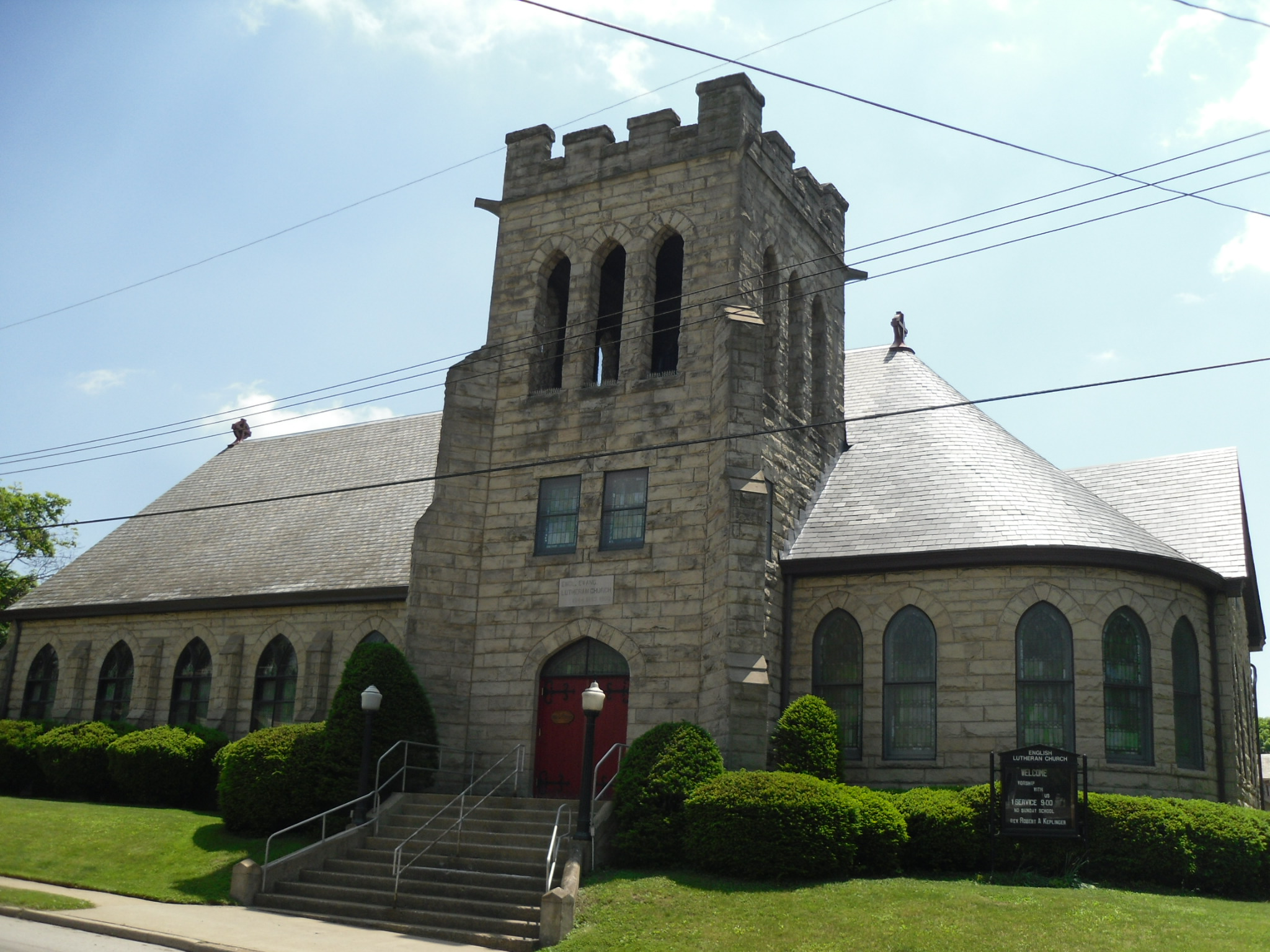
English Lutheran Church, Zelienople, PA

The University of Vermont and Harvard University hold many of the Hopkins' family papers. Hopkins introduced Gothic architecture to the Episcopal Church. Much of his architectural legacy has been lost, including his Gothic Saint Paul's Cathedral in Burlington. It was destroyed by fire in February 1972. However, Saint Paul's Lutheran Church in Zelienople, Pennsylvania, which was built in 1826, still survives.

== Works by and about Hopkins ==
During Hopkins' thirty-six years as Bishop of the Diocese of Vermont, he became "one of the nation's most noted (and controversial) clergy persons. He published more than fifty books and pamphlets. He composed tunes to 336 psalms and hymns and overtures for piano and orchestra. He also wrote poetry.

=== Books ===
- Christianity Vindicated in Seven Discourses on the External Evidences of the New Testament (Edward Smith, 1833).
- The Primitive Creed, Examined and Explained; In two Parts. The First Part Containing Sixteen Discourses on the Apostles' Creed; designed for popular use. The Second Part containing a Dissertation on the testimony of the Early Councils, and the Fathers, from the Apostolic Age to the end of the fourth Century, with Observations on certain Theological Errors of the present day. (Burlington: Edward Smith. 1834).
- The Primitive Church, compared with the Protestant Episcopal Church of the present day: Being an examination of the ordinary objections against the Church in Doctrine, Worship and Government, designed for Popular use; with a Dissertation on Sundry Points of Theology and Practice, connected with the subject of Episcopacy. (Burlington: Smith & Harrington. 1835).

The three above books were "widely circulated, and commanded such respect that Harper Brothers offered to publish any succeeding work from Hopkins' pen, without question.

- The Church of Rome in her Primitive Purity, Compared with the Church of Rome, at the Present Day; Being a Candid Examination of her Claims to Universal Dominion. Addressed in the Spirit of Christian Kindness, to the Roman Hierarchy. (Vernon Harrington. 1837). Reprinted in London in 1839. There it "received unstinted praise from the Anglican ministry."
- The Vermont Drawing Books in Six Lithograph Numbers, The Vermont Drawing Book of Flowers, and The Vermont Drawing Book of Figures (1838).
- Sixteen Lectures on the Causes, Principles, and Results of the British Reformation. (James M. Campbell & Co., 1844).
- History of the Confessional (Harper & Brothers, 1850).
- The History and Results of the Confessional. (Harper & Brothers, 1850.
- The End of Controversy Controverted: A Refutation of Milner's "End of Controversy," in a series of letters addressed to the Most Rev. Francis Patrick Kenrick, Roman Catholic Archbishop of Baltimore. In two volumes: Volume One. and Volume Two.
- Francis Patrick Kenrick, A Vindication of the Catholic Church: In a Series of Letters Addressed to the Rt. Rev. John Henry Hopkins, Protestant Episcopal Bishop of Vermont (J. Murphy, 1855).
- The American Citizen: His Rights and Duties (Pudney & Russell, 1857.
- A Scriptural, Ecclesiastical and Historical View of Slavery, from the Days of the Patriarch Abraham to the Nineteenth Century: Addressed to The Rt. Rev. Alonzo Potter, D.D., Bishop of the Protestant Episcopal Church, in the Diocese of Pennsylvania. (W. L. Pooley and Co. 1864). The book "went through several editions." Also, the book was Hopkins' "final blast in defense of his beliefs." In it, "each chapter was specifically addressed to The Right Rev. Alonzo Potter. Hopkins "vented his full invective" on Potter, and he said that he will withdraw from Potter's company. The book "elicited several replies" because of Hopkins'supposed "misuse of the Sacred Scriptures" exposed by a Clergyman of the Protestant Episcopal Church.
- A Letter to the Bishops and Delegates of the Protestant Episcopal Church now assembled at Montgomery (1861).
- This is a Letter to G. M. Wharton, etc., in reply to a requested Hopkin's Views on the Aspect of Slavery. Hopkins' Letter on Slavery elicited several replies. One claimed that Hopkins "ripped up" and "misused" the Sacred Scriptures exposed by a Clergyman of the Protestant Episcopal Church.
- "Review of a Letter from Hopkins on Bible View of Slavery by a Vermonter. (Free Press Print, 1861). The Bibliography of Vermont: or A List of Books and Pamphlets Relating in Any Way to the State. With Biographical and Other Notes.
- Autobiography in Verse,1866).
- The History of the Church in Verse (W. I. Pooley, 1867).
- A Candid Examination of the Question Whether the Pope of Rome is the Great Antichrist of Scripture (Hurd and Houghton, 1868). The book "was noted for its entire fairness and great dignity".
- Poems by the Wayside: Written during more than Forty Years (James Pott, 1883). 12mo, pp. vii, 324.
- Twelve Canzonets: Sacred Songs; Words and Music; for the use of Christian Families (London: and New York: 1889.

=== Letters ===
- A Letter to the Bishop and Delegates of The Church, now assembled at Montgomery. June, 1861. James M. Donald, Bishop Hopkins and the Reunification of the Church (Historical Magazine of the Protestant Episcopal Church Vol. 47, No. 1 (March,1978), pp. 73-91.
- A Letter to the Right Rev. Francis Patrick Kenrick, Roman Bishop of Arath, and Coadjutor of the Roman Bishop of Philadelphia, in answer to His Letter on Christian Union, Addressed to the Bishops of the Protestant Episcopal Church. (Chauncey Goodrich. 1842).
- A Second Letter to the Right Rev. Francis P Kenrick, Roman Catholic Bishop of Philadelphia,(1843.
- A Pastoral Letter addressed by the Bishop to the people of his Diocese on the subject of his correspondence with the Rev. William Henry Holt, (C. Goodrich. 1846.
- Letter to the Rev. Samuel Seabury, D. D., Editor of the Churchman. (1846).
- A Pastoral Letter, Addressed to the several Parishes at the request of The Convocation of The Clergy, September 16, 1852.
- The True Principles of Restoration to the Episcopal Office: A Letter Addressed to the Clergy and the Laity of the Protestant Episcopal Church in the United States,(1854).
- A Pastoral Letter, on the Support of the Clergy Addressed to the Wardens, Vestrymen and Parishioners in the Diocese of Vermont. (Stacy & Jameson, 1854).
- A Pastoral Letter to the Friends of Sound Doctrine, Piety and Education, in behalf of the Vermont Episcopal Institute. (October 1855).
- A Pastoral Letter, Addressed to the several Parishes at the request of The Convocation of The Clergy, September 16, 1852.

=== Writing about Hopkins ===
- Letters to John H. Hopkins, D.D., Bishop of the Protestant Episcopal Church for the Diocese of Vermont, Occasioned by his Lecture in Opposition to the Temperance Society by an Episcopalian (Chronicle Press, 1836).
- Bible View of Slavery by John H. Hopkins, D. D., Bishop of the Diocese of Vermont: Examined by Henry Drisler (1863).
- Fanny Kemble, The Views of Judge Woodward and Bishop Hopkins on Negro slavery at the South: illustrated from the Journal of a resident on a Georgia plantation. (1863).
- Protest of the Bishop and Clergy of the Diocese of Pennsylvania against Bishop Hopkins' Letter on African Slavery, September, 1863.
- "Review of a Letter from the Rt. Rev. John H. Hopkins, Bishop of Vermont, on the Bible View of Slavery by a Vermonter (Free Press, 1861).

=== Unpublished writings ===
The above listing of Hopkin's published does not include "Communications to the Daily or Weekly Press" of works left in Manuscript form, or of "incomplete or of unprinted Sermons of which the number left is very great."

== See also ==
- List of presiding bishops of the Episcopal Church in the United States of America
- List of Episcopal bishops of the United States
- Historical list of the Episcopal bishops of the United States

== Notes ==
Episcopal Church (USA) titles
Preceded by Thomas Church Brownell	8th Presiding Bishop; 1865–1868	Succeeded by Benjamin Bosworth Smith
Preceded by New Diocese	1st Bishop of Vermont; 1832-1868	Succeeded by William H. A. Bissell
