= Elisabeth Caland =

German woman pianist

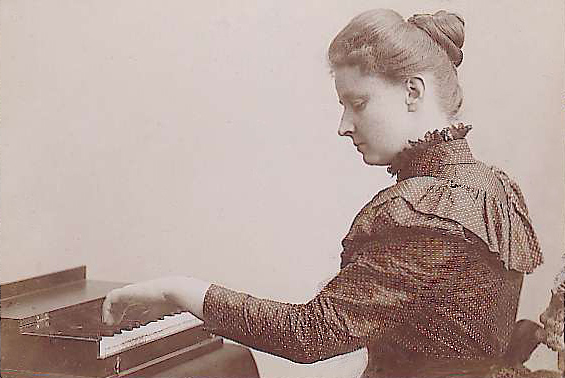
Elisabeth Caland

Elisabeth Johanna Amelia Caland (13 January 1862 in Rotterdam − 26 January 1929 in Berlin) was a German pianist, piano teacher and theorist of piano technique of Dutch origin.

== Life ==
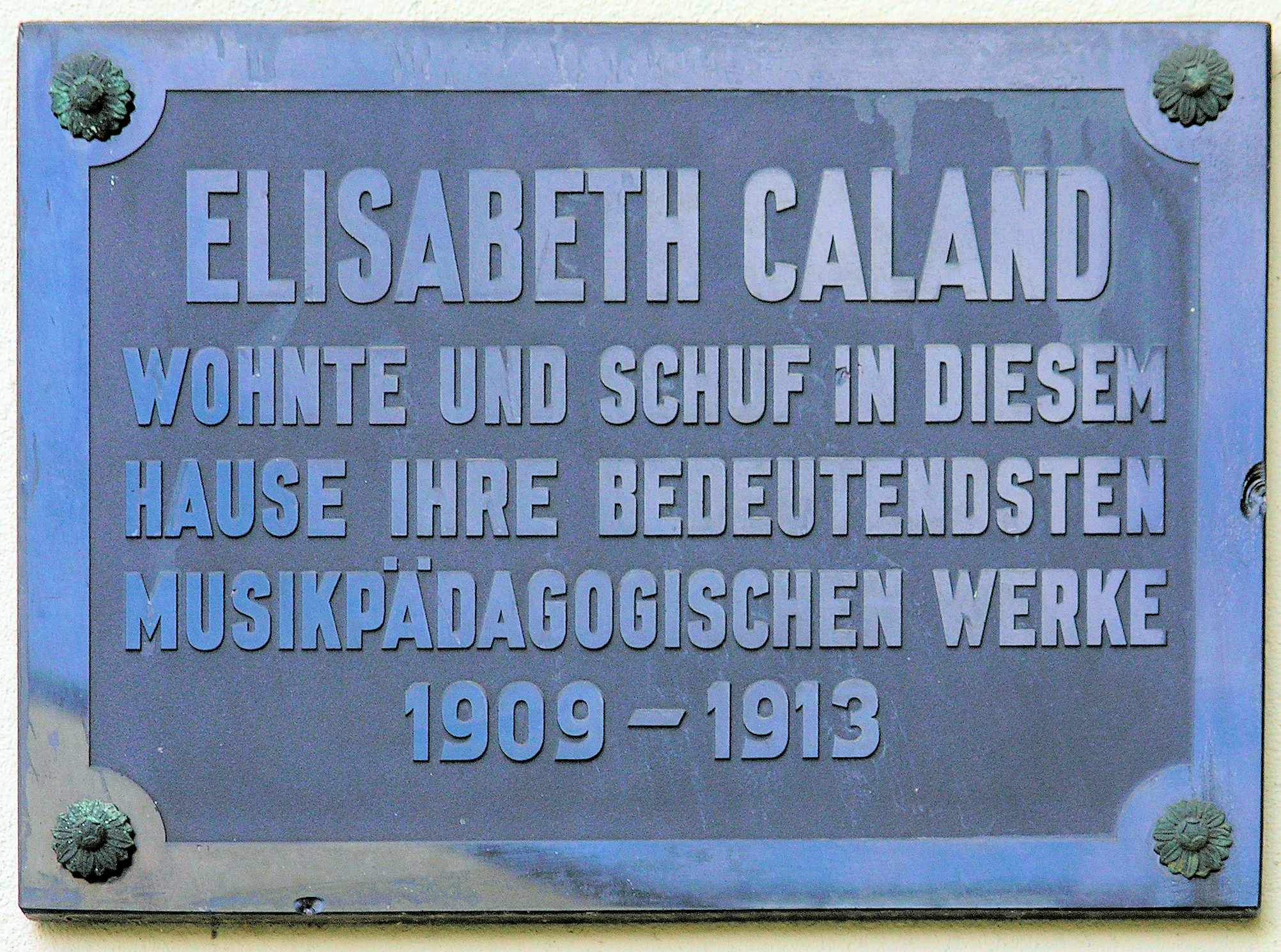
Commemorative plaque on her residential building in Berlin-Charlottenburg, Nithackstraße 22

Caland was born in Rotterdam. She received her first education in Rotterdam. Afterwards she studied piano with Marie Jaëll in Paris and 1884–86 with Ludwig Deppe in Berlin, after which she continued her education with Anna and Horace F. Clark-Steiniger (both were also students of Deppe), and 1895–96 with Josef Řebíček (music theory). She first taught piano in Wiesbaden, since 1898 in Berlin and since 1915 in Gehlsdorf and Rostock. She represented Deppe's conception of piano playing by means of coordinated movement of the whole arm instead of an isolated finger movement that emerged from harpsichord playing. She advocated this way of playing, which was in confrontation with the usual way of playing at the time. She was the first to establish the conscious lowering of the shoulder blade as an art movement to develop the back muscles as a source of strength when playing the piano, which she taught practically. She also introduced the shaking movement from the shoulder into the methodology as a systematic basis for the execution of tremolo figures and trills. She wrote several books on piano technique, in which she described the "Deppe's method", as well as articles in the journal Musikpädagogische Blätter.

Caland died in Berlin at the age of 67.

== Works ==
- Die Deppe'sche Lehre des Klavierspiels, Ebner, Stuttgart 1897. Repr. Wilhelmshaven, 2004). ISBN 3-7959-0854-X, trans. as Artistic Piano Playing as Taught by Ludwig Deppe (1901 Nashville, Reprint ISBN 9780344157028
- Ludwig Deppe's Fünffingerübungen und sein mit Fingersatz und Pedalbrauch bezeichnetes Übungsmaterial, Ebner'sche Hof-Musikalienhandlung, Stuttgart 1899.
- Das künstlerische Klavierspiel in seinen physiologischen und physikalischen Vorgängen, Magdeburg 1910. Repr. Wilhelmshaven, 2005). ISBN 3-7959-0860-4
- Technische Ratschläge für Klavierspieler, Ebner, Stuttgart 1902 (new edition together with Die Deppe'sche Lehre des Klavierspiel, idem, 1912).
- Die Ausnützung der Kraftquellen beim Klavierspiel. Stuttgart 1905. Repr. Wilhelmshaven, 2006). ISBN 3-7959-0872-8
- Anhaltspunkte zur Kontrolle zweckmässiger Armbewegungen beim künstlerischen Klavierspiel, Magdeburg, Heinrichshofen 1919. Repr. Wilhelmshaven, 2005). ISBN 3-7959-0868-X
- Praktische Lehrgänge für künstlerisches Klavierspiel, Stuttgart 1921.
- Vorübungen zum schnellen Oktavenspiel für Deppes Fünffingerübungen, 1923.

== Publications ==
- Réforme pianistique : (système Deppe). (1899)
- Das künstlerische Klavierspiel in seinen physiologisch-physikalischen Vorgängen : nebst Versuch einer praktischen Anleitung zur Ausnützung seiner Kraftquellen. (1919)
- Die Deppe'sche Lehre des Klavierspiels.
- Artistic piano playing, as taught by Ludwig Deppe : together with Practical advice on questions of technique.

== Literature ==
- Hugo Riemann: Caland, Elisabeth. In Musiklexikon, 11th edition, Max Hesses Verlag, Berlin 1929, p. 267. (Digitalisat.)

== Secondary literature ==
Fay, Amy: Music-Study in Germany (Chicago, 1880, Reprint New York 1991) ISBN 0548745412

Roth, Elgin: Die Wiederentdeckung der Einfachheit (Augsburg 2004) ISBN 3-89639-434-7

Wurm, Mary: Praktische Vorschule zur Caland-Lehre, Hannover 1914

Ydefeldt, Stefan, Die einfache runde Bewegung am Klavier: Bewegungsphilosophien um 1900 und ihre Auswirkungen auf die heutige Klaviermethodik, Augsburg 2018: Wissner Verlag orig. Schwedisch, ISBN 978-3-95786-136-8

Ydefeldt, Stefan: Musik und Bewegung beim Klavierspiel – 74 bedenkenswerte Übungen, Augsburg 2023, ISBN 978-3-95786-341-6
