= Charles Jerome Hopkins =

American composer (1836–1898)

Charles Jerome Hopkins (April 4, 1836 – November 4, 1898) was a 19th-century musician, Composer and Champion of the Arts. He is often confused, in historical texts, with his nephew, Edward Hopkins, who was also a musician and composer.

Charles Jerome Hopkins

== Early life and inspirations ==
Charles Jerome Hopkins was born April 4, 1836, in Burlington, Vermont. He was the 9th child of that state's first Episcopal Bishop, John Henry Hopkins, and Mellusina Muller Hopkins. Born prematurely, with a weak heart, it was uncertain that he would live beyond infancy. In a letter addressed to him from his aunt Amelia, many years later, it was observed that Charles labored at breathing when he was a child, suffered a lifelong heart murmur and was missing the "pinkie toe" on one of his feet – this latter physical feature responsible for keeping him out of the service during the Civil War. Charles did survive though he lived a protected and, some would say, a spoiled life due to his delicate health.

From the earliest ages right up through adolescence he was exempt from the work that was required of his older brothers who helped clear land, cut forest, plant an apple orchard and help build the family home and their father's school: the Vermont Episcopal Institute at Rock Point (Burlington, Vermont). Charles was under the care of his elder brother Theodore A. Hopkins who, for 21 years, was headmaster of The Institute school. Theodore was very much like a second father to the boy and encouraged "Charlie", as he was nicknamed by the family, to pursue milder passions.

Painting, music, and literature became Charlie's disciplines. Several small sketches from his childhood survive in Hopkins family files at the University of Vermont's Bailey Howe Library in the Special Collections room. One is a watercolor of Lake Champlain with sailboats. Another is a portrait of a small girl. Some sketches of horses and flowers are in the small collection of artworks as well.

Charlie's first musical compositions appear when he is nine years old. Hopkins was a self-taught musician and composer and from the beginning of his musical education and career, he spurned European music. Among the exceptions to that preference were Handel, Beethoven and Mendelssohn. Those composers he supported and he would later include their compositions among the pieces to be performed by either himself or his students. By and large, however, he believed that an American musical style, composed by American artists, would come to be respected and revered if only America would embrace and cultivate its own native artists.

At the time, America was still considered to be inhabited by crude immigrants and rebels with no culture. Classical music and opera were ruled by Europe and it was believed by many, worldwide, that only Europeans could become Masters of the Arts. Charles Jerome Hopkins was determined to prove them wrong.

From the age of ten, barely able to reach the stops, Charlie played pipe organ at St. Paul's Episcopal Cathedral (Burlington, Vermont). He traveled, as well, to churches in Rutland, Vermont and Rochester, New York to play organ and help Theodore write liturgical music for the church services. It was noted by Theodore, in letters of reference for Charles, that the lad could learn any composition by ear. Throughout his entire life, when giving his musical tours and performances, Hopkins never used sheet music or notes when performing or lecturing.

== Education and early formative experiences ==
At the age of fourteen, Charles attended the University of Vermont, studying chemistry. He loved the science and for much of his life, even when he dedicated himself to music, it was thought of him that he struggled to choose between two equal masters of his passions: Chemistry and Music. He did not graduate from UVM, rather he left Vermont, first for London to play at The Crystal Palace and then for New York City. He had decided once and for all that the cause of discovering the American Art through music was to be his life's purpose.

At the age of 16, Charles Jerome Hopkins arrived at Cooper Union and applied for a music teaching position, without credentials or experience. He was told to go gather up some experience and try again. Becoming an organist at several New York City churches (including the illustrious and historical Trinity Cathedral), he built up his experience but also set into place the pattern of animosity with those in authority that would plague him his entire life and ruin, in many instances, the successes he could have had.

== In New York: character and disposition ==
Letters written by "C. Jerome Hopkins", as he now referred to himself, from those first years in New York indicate ongoing feuds with musical directors at the churches where he played organ, unceasing conflicts with other musicians and endless complaints from Jerome about a lack of support and funding for the musical education of choirs. It would seem that there was no professional relationship in his life that did not sour due to Hopkins' general tendency to insist on his righteous and stubborn belief that he was correct in all matters musical and that his opinions must be recognized as valid or someone would suffer the consequences.

His emphatic and dramatic mannerisms early made Jerome enemies in the New York arts circles and it became common practice for the writers at The New York Times to comment upon his fiery temper and overly proud demeanor. Taking up a regular habit of writing frequent letters to the editor at the Times, Hopkins attempted to champion musical education and the cultivation of a uniquely American musical flavor. He spared no one, however, in his public letters and leading figures of the day were called out for their lack of support of the Arts. Some took serious offense, and one member of the Rockefeller family eventually threatened to sue Hopkins for defamation of character.

One of the more volatile and public events precipitated by Hopkins' tendency to offend came after he had given a young lady living in Vermont, with whom he was acquainted in his youth, with a book of poetry. The lady's fiance apparently took great offense at the gift of the book, as some passages had been noted and he felt that the passages were "...obscene and filthy". The young man confronted Jerome at his home and attacked him with a leather strap, leaving marks across his face and injuring one of his hands. Hopkins tried to press charges but only succeeded in bringing a civil suit against the man. During the case, Jerome stated that the book had been marked by someone else long before he came upon it and that "...in any case, only a filthy mind would consider such poetry filthy..." The work in question was a collection of poems written by Elizabeth Barrett Browning.

Having already become a figure of some public notice due to his outspoken nature and rather unusual methods of persuasion, much was written by Hopkins supporters and detractors alike about the case and about the farce he had made of the events. He won his case, receiving payment from the man for injuries and slander. That was not enough to satisfy Hopkins, though. Taking out a quarter page ad in The New York Times, he humiliated his attacker and called him an "... immature, undeveloped ape of a clerk, barely able to appreciate the spoken word... much less fine poetry..."

Among his contemporaries, Hopkins could count such a figure as Louis Morreau Gottschalk as his friend and colleague. Being an friend of Gottschalk's, Jerome sold his Chickering piano-forte to fund a tour with him.

== Career ==
In 1856, at the age of 20, Hopkins formed the American Music Association with other prominent Victorian American musicians – not all of whom were American born but who lived and composed and performed in New York and championed the cause of American Art. George Bristow was Jerome's sometime friend, sometime enemy and one of the founders of the Association. The Association's activities were hosted by Cooper Union for some time and at the campus Jerome began giving free vocal classes to children, young men and to women; regardless of race, age, marriage status or social class.

He began teaching by paying for materials and rents out of his own pocket, something he would continue to do for many years to come. Hopkins formed the Orpheon Free Music Schools. He would spend much time and energy trying to win subscriptions for the school so as to support it but for the most part, Hopkins paid the bills himself. Eventually, the American Music Association would vanish before the success of the New York Philharmonic and its wealthy benefactors but for a time it was the champion of musicians and performers struggling to be heard (and paid).

During the first few years of managing the Orpheon Schools, Hopkins clarified his position on music, the arts, and the American identity. His personal letters and published works declared that the study of music allowed the individual to become an intelligent, disciplined person capable of engaging in society with worthwhile intentions. Jerome firmly held the belief that crime, drunkenness, idleness and violence would lessen considerably should more citizens take up the demanding and satisfying study of music. More so than religion or law, Hopkins held forth with the opinion that music and the other arts could lift up humanity into morality. With this consideration, he pushed tirelessly for public support of the arts and the institutionalization of arts education in the newly forming public school systems.

Jerome Hopkins did eventually teach vocal music at Cooper Union, from 1863 until resigning in 1869, due to the demands of the Orpheon Free Music Schools and his blossoming personal life, which demanded that he move from Brooklyn to more genteel environs.

== Family life ==
On June 15, 1869, Charles Jerome Hopkins married Sarah Lucinda Lee (nicknamed "Cicily"), at St. Paul's Cathedral in Albany, New York. Records and family letters suggest that her father was a contemporary of Jerome's father, Bishop Hopkins, claiming him as an "... upstanding figure in the [Episcopal] Church..." and referring to Cicily as a "... good daughter of the [Episcopal] Church..." Her father or uncle may have been the Reverend Wm. E. Lee of Albany, NY. Cicily and Jerome lived in Athenia in Clifton, New Jersey, in a house Jerome had designed with his father's assistance. Naming it Clover Hill, Hopkins energetically created terraced gardens and Cicily planted white roses; the letters of this era in Hopkins' life are full of light-heartedness and joy. He felt that he had at last found "...the one soul who could bear his passions and peculiarities, to a fault..."

Articles in the New York Times mention Mrs. Hopkins as participating in veterans' affairs, possibly working as a volunteer nurse, caring for Civil War soldiers home from the war. As a young woman, Mrs. Sarah Lee Hopkins had attended The Albany Female Academy. In the 1877 Alumnae Edition of the Academy's yearbook, a lovely paragraph is written in memory of "... the dear and delightful Miss Lee", who had graduated in 1860. Cicily had been a deeply committed Officer of the St. John's Guild in NYC. She contracted the bronchial consumption that would eventually lead to her death while caring for desperately ill children in hospital, in her line of work with the Guild. Jerome and Cicily had no children. After convalescing in both New Jersey and at the Hopkins family home in Vermont, Sarah Lucinda Lee Hopkins died October 23, 1876, of tuberculosis. Hopkins mourned his Cicily all the rest of his days, carrying with him a deep anger at her loss, as evidenced by his personal journals.

== Works and correspondence ==
Following Cicily's death, Hopkins took up teaching and touring at a break-neck pace. He constantly performed all over the east coast, raising money for the Orpheon schools. He published musical compositions and tried to find someone who would organize his works into book form, also for publication. Having written and published "The Philharmonic Journal" for many years, as a forum for his musical critique, Hopkins hung up his quill pen in 1881, discontinuing the Journal after costs to print it increased. Many old copies of these journals survive in their original paper forms and as part of the online archives of The New York Times and the Brooklyn Eagle. It is well worth reading them to gather a sense of Jerome's biting wit and often hyper-critical observations of his musical peers, written under the names "Timothy Trill" and "Jonathan Swift."

The glimpse one gets, via the lens of Mr. C. Jerome Hopkins, of the Victorian era and the artists of the day is highly rewarding. Some works that had been published and have survived to the present day include a textbook on musical education edited by Hopkins; sheet music of hymns in support of the Union composed by Hopkins during the American Civil War, one of which was titled "God Save Our Fatherland"; a sacred opera, "Samuel"; modern recordings of his works such as the piano rhapsody "The Wind Demon"; the children's opera, "Taffy and Old Munch"; a holy mass, "Te Deum"; and a book of church choral music for children compiled and edited by Jerome. Many unpublished works were preserved by family members and/or donated to various universities as a part of related collections.

Supporting the Orpheon Free Music Schools almost single-handedly took its toll upon Hopkins. Coming close to filing for bankruptcy and losing his home, Jerome reluctantly called upon his family. Theodore and the eldest brother, John, came to his rescue, paying his debts so that he would not have to sell or have seized the lovely property of Clover Hill. The American Music Association had folded, the Orpheon Free Music Schools were struggling, and he had just narrowly avoided complete financial disaster. Following these upheavals, Jerome Hopkins ironically left for Europe to reinvigorate his career.

== Europe ==
In England, Hopkins performed and lectured. Among other topics included in his piano-lectures, during which he would speak and then perform pieces that would illustrate his speaking points, were "Music and The Senses." This lecture focused upon how the "...other four senses and the organic machine of the brain..." could become refined and improved via musical education and the performance of music. It is unknown how much of this kind of cognitive and creative theory originated with Hopkins himself and how much of it came from readings or professional associations with scientists or theorists of the day. In any event, the lectures were unprecedented in their scope and presentation. Newspaper articles covered them with intense interest and vast support, the leading opinion being that Hopkins should do more of his "...theoretical work as regards music and engage less in harassing the public with his endless crusades..."

The connection between the lectures and Jerome's ongoing battle with society and various personal rivals was apparently lost on those who commented thus. However, aside from managing to get himself sued for some aggravation caused to his host in England, Hopkins experienced success there and came home a little bit wealthier and somewhat restored of his inspiration. He did come home to a vandalized house, though. While he was abroad, his house was burgled and several items were missing: a hand-carved violin, some jewelry and some sheet music. The thief was never caught.

While in Europe, Hopkins visited Franz Liszt, with whom he had had an ongoing correspondence ever since age sixteen, when he had sent the great maestro a musical score for examination. Liszt seemed to look favorably upon Jerome's career and creativity, from the letter written in reply to the young composer. Hopkins credited that letter with cementing his decision to devote himself to music and music alone. The visit to Liszt later in Hopkins' life initiated a new relationship between the famous composer and Jerome's niece, Amy Fay. Fay traveled to Europe to study with the Master, eventually writing a comprehensive biographical sketch of the artist that can still be read today, as a part of the memoirs of her travels and studies in Germany.

== Final years ==
The last few years of Jerome Hopkins' life were spent reviving the musical mission of the Orpheon Schools via the newly formed Children's Musical Congress. Several concerts were given a year to much success. Hopkins lived to see the first seeds planted for the public support of Arts Education when the New York City Municipal fund was modified early in 1898 to allow schools to set monies aside for musical instruments and teaching staff. Charles Jerome Hopkins died on November 4, 1898, of a brain hemorrhage, at Clover Hill. At the time of his death, Hopkins had composed over 1200 musical pieces.

His deathbed was attended by his niece, Amy Fay, who took possession of his many letters, manuscripts and musical compositions. Upon her death and that of Fay's daughter, those documents were donated to Harvard University's Houghton Library as a part of the Sylvia Mitarachi Wright Collection, where they can still be accessed. Many more documents are stored at the Cooper Union Archives in New York City, The Episcopal Diocese Office of Burlington Vermont at Rock Point, and at the University of Vermont. This unsung and widely unknown composer was, to his last day, a tireless champion of art and the American identity.
