= Rudolf Maria Breithaupt =

German pianist, composer, musicologist and music educator

Rudolf Maria Breithaupt (11 August 1873 – 2 April 1945) was a German composer and music educator (piano).

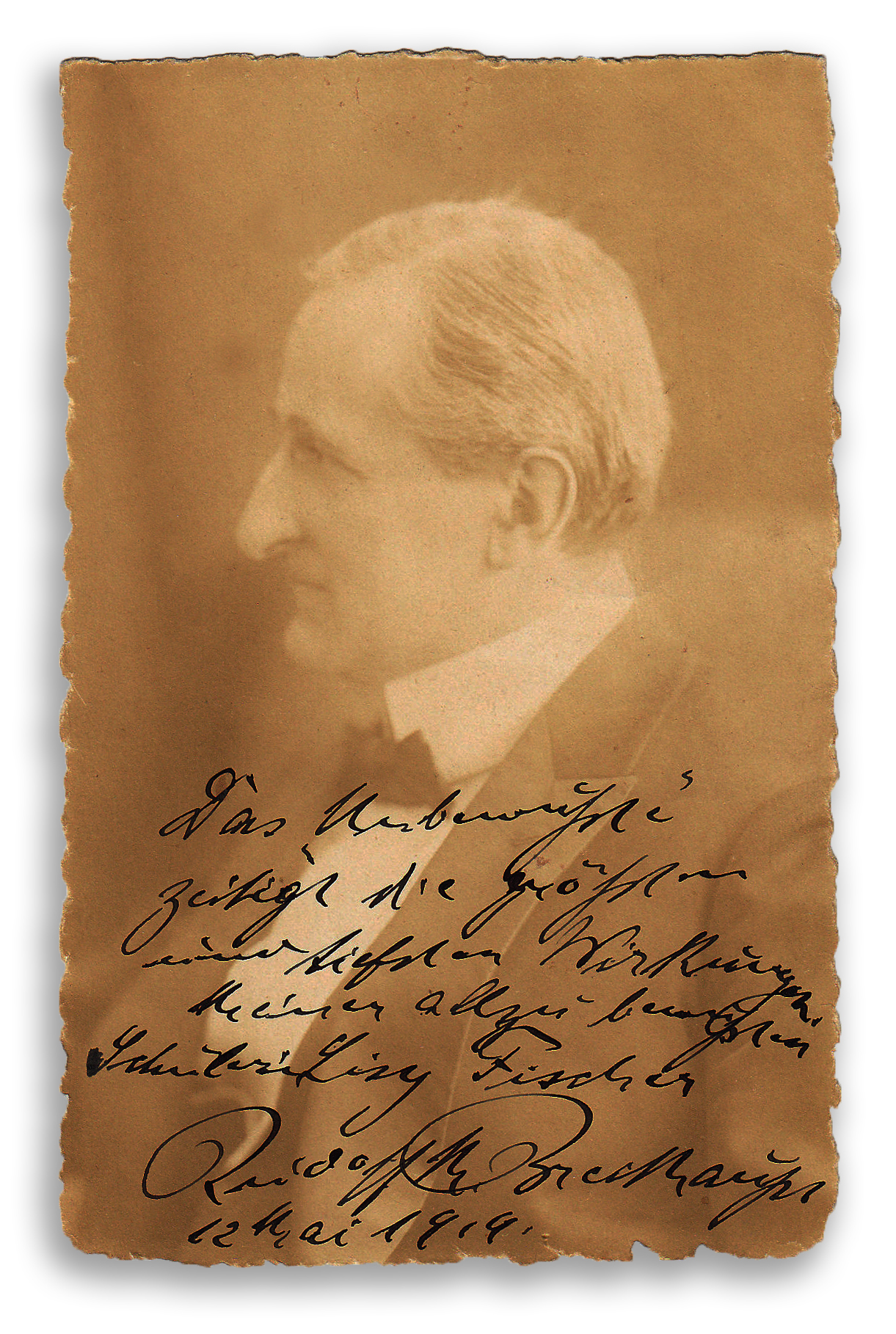
Rudolf Maria Breithaupt

== Life ==
Born in Braunschweig, Breithaupt attended the grammar school in Braunschweig. He studied jurisprudence, then philosophy, psychology and art and musicology at the universities of Jena, Leipzig and Berlin. His teachers were the musicologists Hugo Riemann and Hermann Kretzschmar. At the University of Music and Theatre Leipzig, Breithaupt was a student of Robert Teichmüller, Salomon Jadassohn and Oscar Paul since 1897. Between 1904 and 1911 Breithaupt worked at the Humboldt University of Berlin and later, at least from 1919 to 1929, as piano teacher at the Stern Conservatory in Berlin.

Breithaupt died in Ballenstedt at age 71.

== The "natural piano technique" ==
In its physiological foundations, Breithaupt's "natural piano technique" depends, in its explicit recognition, on the almost contemporary work of the physician and physiologist Friedrich Adolf Steinhausen. Breithaupt's formula "don't think about your fingers, don't want to play with your fingers" effectively summarizes the fundamental principle of the weight technique in antithesis to the digital technique. The latter prescribes the unnatural articulation of the fingers with the motionless hand and the exclusion of any arm input, from which, in addition to an unnecessary expenditure of muscle energy, stiffening, contractions and false finger extensions result. The "new" natural technique - new only as a theoretical formulation, because the great pianists have always played in this way - supports instead the need to adequately exploit the inertial weight of the whole arm from the shoulder down to the hand. The starting point is "a state of rest and complete muscular relaxation of the arm, just as we can observe it in a sleeping child or get it ourselves by letting the arm rest on the back of a chair;

== The "digital game" ==
Despite the tendency to identify any independent movement of the fingers with stiffening and contraction of the hand and arm, Breithaupt believes that "digital play" still plays a role in piano technique and is the superior and conclusive degree of the study. This is the least convincing part of Breithaupt's treatise which appears to be divided into two parts which are difficult to reconcile: on the one hand the free play of the weight in relaxation (lower and middle degree: fundamental technique), on the other hand the digital play (upper degree: "artistic technique") which always involves a certain degree of "fixation" or muscular tension. He drew criticism of the opposite kind: that, moved by Tobias Matthay, of having considered the weight of the arm as an exclusive element of the technique and that, by Steinhahausen, of having reintroduced the old digital technique.

Actually Breithaupt realized, with musical sensitivity and on the basis of his piano experience, the necessity of finger technique for a complete and artistic piano technique, but he was not able to justify it in a coherent way within the new approach. Steinhausen's criticism, corrected on a physiological level, did not grasp the specific piano problem intuited and not solved by Breithaupt: how to understand the digital game avoiding stiffenings and contractions of the hand and arm, i.e. the typical drawbacks of the traditional finger technique.

== Work ==
- Die natürliche Klaviertechnik. Vol. 1: Handbuch der modernen Methodik und Spielpraxis für Künstler und Lehrer, Konservatorien und Institute, Seminare und Schulen, 1912.
- Die natürliche Klaviertechnik. Vol. 2: Die Grundlagen des Gewichtsspieles, 1909.
- Praktische Studien zur natürlichen Klaviertechnik. 5th issue, 1916–1921.
- Moderne Klavieristen. Teresa Carreño. In Die Musik., vol. 3, 1903.
- Frédéric Chopin. In Die Musik. Vol. 8, 1st issue, 1908/09, pp. 3–14.
- Die natürliche Klaviertechnik, [I:] Die freie, rhytmisch-natürliche Bewegung (Automatik) des gesamten Spielorganismus Spielorganismus (Schulter, Arme, Hände, Finger) als Grundlage der "klavieristischen" Technik (The free, rhythmic-natural (automatic) movement of all the organs involved in playing (shoulder, arm, hands, fingers) as the foundation of the "piano" technique), Leipzig, 1905, C. F. Kahnt Nachfolger.
- Die natürliche Klaviertechnik, I: Handbuch der modernen Metodik und Spielpraxis (Manual of modern method and instrumental practice) (III ed. completely revised), id. 1912; IV ed. (with bibliographical appendix), id., 1922.
- Die natürliche Klaviertechnik, II: Die Grundlagen des Gewichtspiels (The Basics of Weight Technique), id., 1906; III ed. revised, id., 1913; IV ed. 1922.
- The Idea of Weight Playing. Its Value and Practical Application, in The Musician, January 1911.
- Die natürliche Klaviertechnik, [III]: Praktische Studien (5 notebooks), id., 1913; 1919-1922 (German, English and French trilingual text).

=== Translations ===
- Natural Piano-Technic vol. II The Fundamentals of Weight-Playing, Leipzig, 1908, C. F. Kahnt Nachfolger.
- Natural Piano-Technic vol. II School of Weight-Touch, Leipzig, 1909, C. F. Kahnt Nachfolger.
- Technique Naturelle du Piano vol. Les Fondements du Jeu des Pesanteurs, 1908, C. F. Kahnt Nachfolger.
- Technique Naturelle du Piano vol. II La technique de la pesanteur (tr. by E. Closson), 1909, C. F. Kahnt Nachfolger.

=== Secondary Literature ===
- Luca Chiantore, Tone Moves: A History of Piano Technique. Barcelona: Musikeon Books, 2019.
- Gerig, Reginald: Famous Pianists and Their Technique (Washington 1976) ISBN 0-88331-066-X
- Polo Spagnolo - Giovanni Stelli, Pianosophia. Tecnica e arte, Naples, 2008, Guide.
- Ydefeldt, Stefan, Die einfache runde Bewegung am Klavier: Bewegungsphilosophien um 1900 und ihre Auswirkungen auf die heutige Klaviermethodik, Augsburg 2018: Wissner Verlag orig. Schwedisch, ISBN 978-3-95786-136-8
