= Melusina Fay Peirce =

American feminist author and activist (1836–1923)

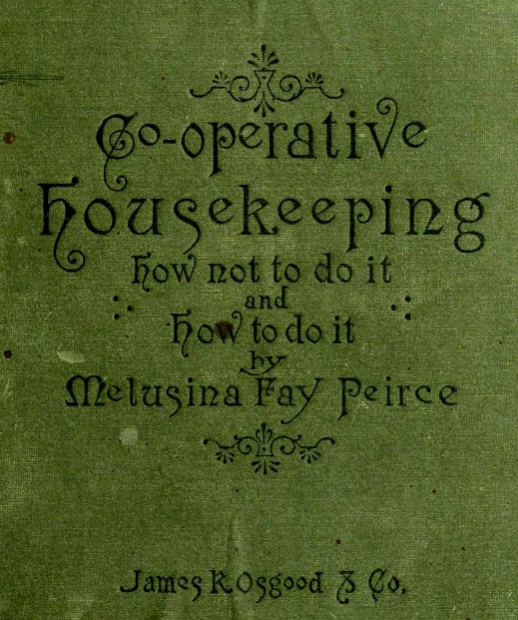
- Born: Harriet Melusina Fay; February 24, 1836; Burlington, Vermont, U.S.
- Died: April 28, 1923 (aged 87); Watertown, Massachusetts, U.S.
- Resting place: Mount Auburn Cemetery
- Occupations: Author; teacher; music critic; organizer; activist
- Spouse: Charles Sanders Peirce

Melusina Fay "Zina" Peirce (/pɜːrs/; February 24, 1836 – April 28, 1923), born Harriet Melusina Fay, was an American feminist, author, teacher, music critic, organizer and activist best known for spearheading the 19th-century "cooperative housekeeping" movement. Peirce believed that gender equality would only come with women's economic independence and "identified the cause of women's economic and intellectual oppression as unpaid, unspecialized domestic work." Her proposed solution to this oppression was "cooperative housekeeping," a system where women would do domestic chores together and profit by requesting payment from their husbands. An important component of her plan was the spatial reorganization of neighborhoods and homes to accommodate domestic cooperation between women.

In 1869, Peirce created the Cambridge Cooperative Housekeeping Association. In addition, she was active in the Boston Woman's Education Association and the Cambridge Woman's Union and promoted the founding of Radcliffe College. Peirce was also the president of the Women's Parliament's first convention, which met in New York in 1869.

She championed causes besides feminism, such as street cleaning and historic preservation, leading initiatives to address these issues. In 1887–1888, she organized the street cleaning committee of the Ladies' Health Protective Association of New York, and in 1900–1901, she organized the Women's Auxiliary to the American Scenic and Historic Preservation Society. Peirce also spearheaded "the New York Women's World Fair committee [in] 1876; the New York women's movement for cheap summer-night concerts [in] 1895; [and] the New York movement to save the Poe cottage [in] 1896; and Fraunces Tavern [in] 1897". In 1898–1899, she organized the Women's Philharmonic Society of New York.

As a nativist, Peirce was a vocal opponent of increased immigration to the United States and expressed animosity against Irish-Americans.

Her writings appear in the Atlantic Monthly, the Boston Post, and the Chicago Evening Journal. She wrote Cooperative Housekeeping: How not to do it, and How to do it: A Study in Sociology (1884), Cooperative Housekeeping (1889), and New York, A Symphonic Study. She also edited Music-Study in Germany (1881), written by her sister Amy Fay.

== Family, ancestry and early life ==
On February 24, 1836, Peirce was born in Burlington, Vermont, in her grandfather, Right Reverend John Henry Hopkins's house. She was of English, French, German, and Irish background

Peirce began learning to sew at age four, but openly expressed her distaste for it. However, Peirce was an obedient, "dutiful and conscientious," Christian child by age eight. According to her mother, young Peirce was "above the common grade of children of her age [and] mature in Christian principle and self-government." Young Peirce was also a writer. When she was eight years old, Peirce wrote "On Temptation" and "On Carelessness," two personal documents decorated with ornate calligraphy that showcased her religious upbringing:

On Temptation

"Temptation is the voice of the devil speaking in our hearts to persuade us to do wrong. It is the worst thing in the world when people are tempted. If they do not pray to God to help them resist it, they will yield at last and sin; but sometimes, they do not yield directly but hesitate a little while. If they pray to God earnestly in their hearts, while they are hesitating, they will be enabled to resist the devil, and he will flee from them, [and] the hour of temptation will pass away from them without their doing wrong. When our Saviour was tempted in the wilderness forty days and forty nights, Satan asked Him to fall and worship him, he replied, "Get thee behind me, Satan, for it is written thou shalt worship thy Lord they God, and Him only shall thou serve." He did this as an example to us, that we should strive against temptation."

— H. M. Fay; October 17, 1844

On Carelessness

"Carelessness means that sometimes when people are employed in any way, they do not care how they do their work or take pains with what they are about. When people are careless, their trunks will be in confusion, and they will leave their clothes, and their shoes, and their soiled linen, about their bedrooms; and if they sleep with any companions who are careless too, then their rooms would be in disorder, and their soiled clothes will get mingled up together, and thus great disorder will be produced. Sometimes, when one of them looks over her clothes, she will find some collars or aprons missing. She will ask the other one to look into her trunk or bureau and see if any of her lost clothes are in her trunk, and perhaps the other one will say, Oh! I am doing something else now, and I will do it some other time, "and perhaps she will forget it, [and] thus the lost things never be found and this is the consequence of carelessness."

— H. M. Fay; October 28, 1844

According to her sister Amy Fay, Peirce played the melodeon and hymn tunes in her father's church, starting at age nine. At 19, Fay wrote to Ralph Waldo Emerson, strongly criticizing his Unitarianism.

Peirce's father was Dr. Reverend Charles Hopkins Fay (1808–1888), an Episcopal bishop from Cambridge, Massachusetts. The Reverend married twice in his lifetime: to Sophronia Adams White and Emily Hopkins Fay. His parents were Judge Samuel Phillips Prescott and Harriet (Howard) Fay.

Peirce's mother was Emily Hopkins Fay (May 4, 1817 – September 23, 1856), whose maiden name was Charlotte C. Hopkins. Emily was born in Ligonier, Pennsylvania, but also had significant ties to Pittsburgh, Pennsylvania. One of thirteen children, she was forced by her clergyman father to quit school at fourteen. Emily would go on to become a severely overworked housewife. She died at age 39 in St. Albans, Vermont. The toil that plagued her life instilled in Peirce an ardent desire to improve the lives of housewives. Emily's parents were the Right Reverend John Henry Hopkins and Melusina (Muller) Hopkins. Right Reverend John Henry Hopkins was the first bishop of Vermont.

One of nine children, Peirce had six sisters, including Amelia Muller "Amy" Fay (a pianist), Rose Emily Fay, Laura Matilda Fay, Katherine Maria Fay, and Lily Valeria Fay. Her brothers were Alfred St. John Fay, Herman Theophilus Fay, and Charles Norman Fay. Peirce's predecessors included John Fay, Anne Hutchinson and Caroline Howard Gilman.

== Education ==
As a child, Peirce studied in schools run by her parents in the various towns she lived in, including Montpelier, Georgia; Bayou Goula and New Orleans, Louisiana; and St. Albans, Vermont. "As well as the usual reading, writing, and arithmetic, her studies included Latin, French, drawing, and a great deal of music. She played the piano, the organ, trained choirs, and sang alto". She also taught in these schools.

Two weeks after her mother's death in September 1856, Peirce was in contact with Ralph Waldo Emerson, who recommended that she attend the Young Ladies' School of Professor Louis Agassiz, a renowned natural scientist and proponent of human polygenism in Cambridge. In November 1859, she started school there, where she studied "science, philosophy, literature, history, and other subjects usually well outside of the educational limits for young women, even of her class". She also developed a liking for scientific thinking and was an exemplary student. Peirce graduated in the summer of 1861, when she gave the graduation speech.

Peirce would go on to consider herself a sociologist.

== Later years ==
Melusina Fay married Charles Sanders Peirce in the early 1860s, but separated from him in 1876 and divorced him in the early 1880s.

Following the failure of her cooperative housing experiment, Peirce continued to advocate the "cooperative housekeeping" cause, traveling to London and Berlin to meet with European champions of cooperation. Peirce was also involved in several talks, in which she spoke about new insights gathered during her trip abroad and views on "womanhood" suffrage.

On October 4, 1876, Peirce spoke at the Fourth Woman's Congress in Philadelphia about what she had learned about cooperation in Europe. In 1880, Peirce spoke at the Illinois Social Science Association, where she advocated the creation of a "Woman's House" as an alternative to the United States Senate.

== Death ==
On April 28, 1923, Peirce died of chronic arthritis and valvular heart disease in her home in Watertown, Massachusetts. She was buried at Mount Auburn Cemetery in Watertown two days later.
