= Amy Fay =

American concert pianist (1844–1928)

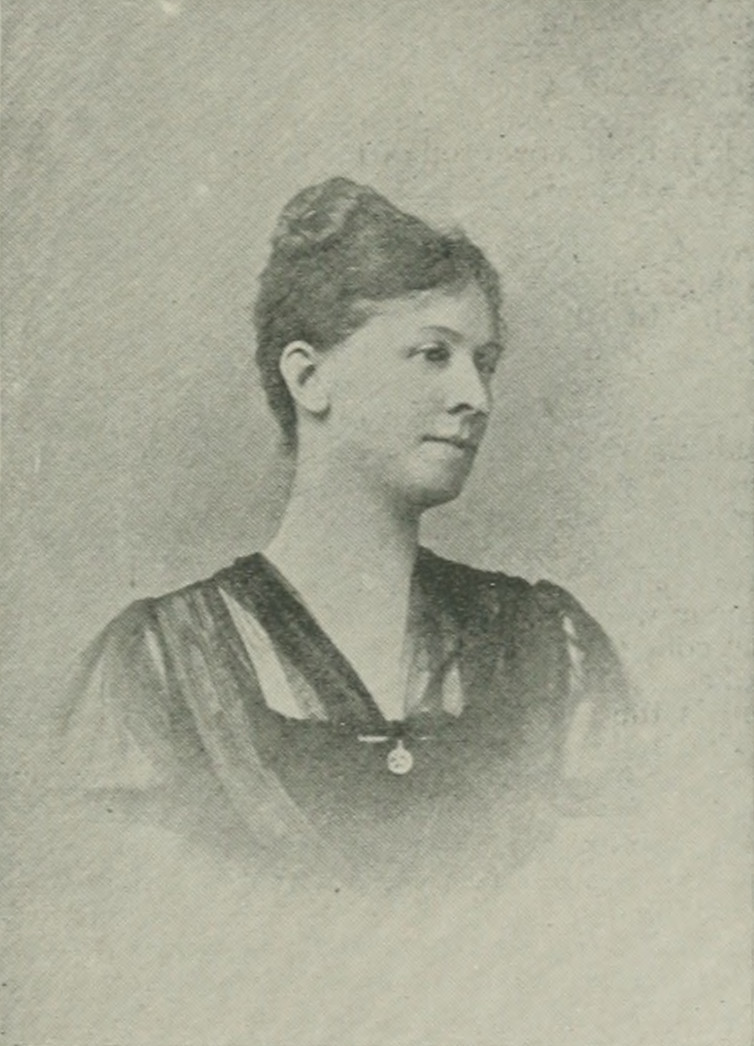
- Amy Fay, circa 1897

Background information
- Born: May 21, 1844; Bayou Goula, Louisiana, United States
- Died: November 9, 1928 (aged 84)
- Occupation: Pianist

Amelia Muller Fay (May 21, 1844 – November 9, 1928) was an American concert pianist, manager of the New York Women's Philharmonic Society, and chronicler best known for her memoirs of the European classical music scene. A pupil of Theodor Kullak, Fay traveled to Europe to study with Franz Liszt. Her letters home from Germany, including descriptions of her training and the concerts she attended, were published in 1880 as Music Study in Germany. These memoirs include a comprehensive biographical sketch of Liszt.

Fay was born in 1844 in Bayou Goula, Louisiana. She was the third of six daughters and the fifth of nine children of the Rev. Charles Fay and Emily (Hopkins) Fay of Louisiana and St. Albans, Vermont. She was Charles Jerome Hopkins's niece. Her sister Rose Emily Fay married the conductor Theodore Thomas, and her sister Melusina Fay Peirce was the wife of the American philosopher Charles Sanders Peirce.

Amy Fay studied piano under Professor John Knowles Paine of Harvard and at the New England Conservatory of Music.

From 1869 to 1875, she continued her lessons in Germany. She had made it her goal to become a pupil of Carl Tausig who had just opened a piano class in Berlin. She was allowed to join the class, where she met Vera Timanov, a fellow student who would become a famous pianist in Russia. She also received lessons from Theodor Kullak whose instructions were not to her satisfaction. A few months later she managed to gain access to Franz Liszt's piano lessons in Weimar. Liszt was impressed by her playing and liked to talk to her. He regaled her with a little anecdote about himself and Chopin, in which Chopin dressed up as Liszt to play a trick on a friend of Liszt's. Stories like these she happily related back home to America via a stream of letters, which got published in Dwight's Journal, as publication from Boston dedicated to musical matters. These letters were later on the foundation of her book "Music Study in Germany" that is to this day one of the best sources on German music teaching and the music scene around 1870. In it she describes how German troops were celebrated after their victory in the German-French war of 1870-1, what Germans ate, how they lived and what they thought about women's role in society. The central parts are reserved to her observations on how she met and what she thought about Clara Schumann, Marie Wieck, Friedrich Wieck, Carl Tausig, Hans von Bülow, Joseph Joachim, August Wilhelmj, Anna Mehlig and most of all - Franz Liszt.

Her last German piano teacher was Ludwig Deppe, about whom she had heard a lot and whose technique intrigued her. She got a chance to meet him at a dinner party given in honor of Anna Mehlig by an American businessman in Berlin. Deppe's technique for piano revolutionized her playing and served as the method she herself was to use for her students in the years to come. See: List of music students by teacher: C to F#Amy Fay. On returning to Boston, Fay became well known for her "piano conversations": recitals preceded by short lectures. She moved to Chicago and New York, where she was associated with the Women's Philharmonic Society of New York. She died on November 9, 1928.

== Bibliography ==
- Music Study in Germany by Amy Fay, 1880; originally published by Jansen, McClurg & Company; reprinted by Watson Press, 2007. Edited by her sister Melusina Fay Peirce.
- The Deppe Finger Exercises for Rapidly Developing an Artistic Touch in Piano Forte Playing (carefully arranged, classified and explained by Amy Fay), Chicago, 1890, Straub & Co.

== Secondary literature ==
Caland Elisabeth: Artistic Piano Playing as Taught by Ludwig Deppe (1901 Nashville, Reprint ISBN 9780344157028

Gerig, Reginald: Famous Pianists and Their Technique (Washington 1976) ISBN 0-88331-066-X

Ydefeldt, Stefan, Die einfache runde Bewegung am Klavier: Bewegungsphilosophien um 1900 und ihre Auswirkungen auf die heutige Klaviermethodik, (2018) Augsburg: Wissner Verlag orig. Schwedisch, ISBN 978-3-95786-136-8
