= Ludwig Deppe =

German violinist, composer and conductor (1828–1890)

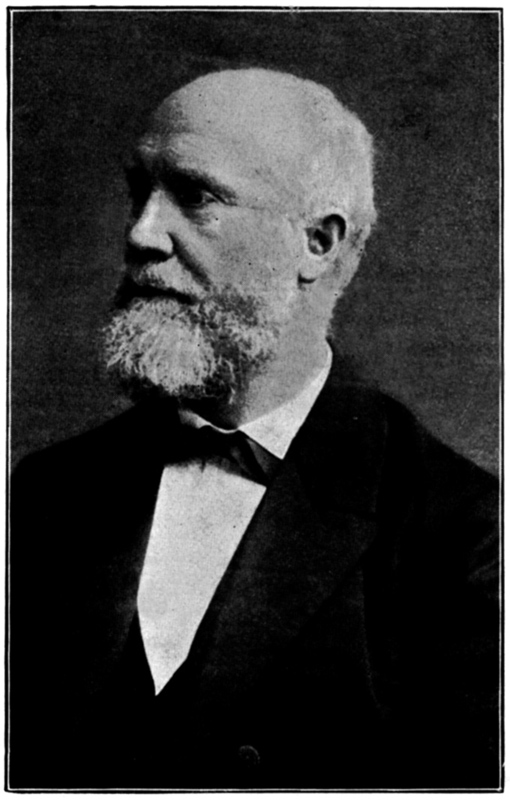

Background information
- Born: 7 November 1828; Alverdissen, Kingdom of Prussia
- Died: 5 September 1890 (aged 61)
- Occupations: Composer; conductor
- Instrument: Violin

Ludwig Deppe (7 November 1828 – 5 September 1890) was a German violinist, composer and conductor, known particularly as a piano teacher.

Deppe was born at Alverdissen, Lippe. He studied with Eduard Marxsen in Hamburg and Johann Christian Lobe in Leipzig. In 1857 he founded a singing society in Hamburg, which he conducted until 1868. In 1874 Deppe went to Berlin, where from 1886 to 1888 he was court conductor. He also conducted the Silesian Musical Festivals from 1876. Deppe died at Bad Pyrmont.

American pianist Amy Fay studied with Deppe from 1873 to 1875 and described his piano pedagogy in vivid terms in her 1880 memoir Music-Study in Germany. Elisabeth Caland detailed his method in her 1903 volume, Artistic Piano Playing as Taught by Ludwig Deppe. Grove's Dictionary summarized Deppe's approach as “the acquirement of an absolutely even touch by the adoption of a very soft tone and a slow pace in practicing, a seat much lower than most teachers recommend, and minute attention to the details of muscular movement.”

In Johannes Brahms: Life and Letters, Styra Avins notes that Deppe was a close friend of Johannes Brahms and a student of Brahms’s piano teacher, Marxsen.

Donald Tovey and Emil von Sauer studied with students of Ludwig Deppe.

== Secondary Literature ==
Caland, Elisabeth Die Deppe’sche Lehre des Klavierspiels (1897; Repr. Wilhelmshaven, 2004). ISBN 3-7959-0854-X

Fay, Amy: Music-Study in Germany (Chicago, 1880, Reprint New York 1991) ISBN 0548745412

Ydefeldt, Stefan, Die einfache runde Bewegung am Klavier: Bewegungsphilosophien um 1900 und ihre Auswirkungen auf die heutige Klaviermethodik, (2018) Augsburg: Wissner Verlag orig. Schwedisch, ISBN 978-3-95786-136-8
