= List of radio operas =

This is a list of operas specifically written for radio performance.

Broadcast premiere	Composed	Composer	Opera title	Librettist and/or source(s)	Radio station
24 March 1925		Geoffrey Toye	The Red Pen	A. P. Herbert	British Broadcasting Company
24 December 1929		Gustav Kneip	Christkinds Erdenreise (The Christ-child's journey on Earth)	Franz Peter Kürten	WERAG
May 1931		Walter Goehr	Malpopita		Berlin
July 1931		Mark Lubbock	The King Can Do No Wrong	C Denis Freeman	British Broadcasting Corporation
25 October 1931		Riccardo Pick-Mangiagalli	L'ospite inatteso	Carlo Veneziani	Ente Italiano per le Audizioni Radiofoniche
26 April 1932		Charles Wakefield Cadman	The Willow Tree	Nelle Richmond Eberhart	NBC
13 July 1933	1932	Werner Egk	Columbus, Bericht und Bildnis (Columbus, report and portrait)		Bayerischer Rundfunk
6 October 1935		Bohuslav Martinů	Hlas lesa (The Voice of the Forest)	Vítězslav Nezval	Czech Radio
15 October 1936		Heinrich Sutermeister	Die schwarze Spinne (The Black Spider)	Albert Rösler, after Jeremias Gotthelf's Die schwarze Spinne	Radio Bern
1937		Vittorio Giannini	Flora		CBS Radio
18 March 1937		Bohuslav Martinů	Veselohra na mostě (Comedy on the Bridge)	Martinů, after Václav Kliment Klicpera	Czech Radio
17 October 1937		Louis Gruenberg	Green Mansions	after the novel Green Mansions by William Henry Hudson	Columbia Broadcasting Company
1938		Vittorio Giannini	Beauty and the Beast	R. Simon	CBS Radio
3 April 1939	1928	Marcel Mihalovici	L'intransigeant Pluton	Jean-François Regnard	RTF
22 April 1939		Gian Carlo Menotti	The Old Maid and the Thief	Gian Carlo Menotti	NBC
2 November 1939		Vittorio Giannini	Blennerhassett	Norman Corwin, Phillip Roll	CBS Radio
29 March 1942		Randall Thompson	Solomon and Balkis	after The Butterfly that Stamped by Rudyard Kipling	CBS
15 September 1942		Mark Lubbock	The Rose and the Violet	Barbara Cartland	British Broadcasting Corporation
10 October 1943		Jacques Ibert	Barbe-bleu	W. Aguet	Radio Lausanne
1949		Tibor Harsányi	Illusions, ou l'histoire d'un miracle	P. Brive, after E. T. A. Hoffmann	RTF
1 December 1949	1944–48	Luigi Dallapiccola	Il prigioniero (The Prisoner)	after stories by Auguste Villiers de l'Isle-Adam and Charles De Coster.	RAI
18 April 1950		Marcel Mihalovici	Phèdre	Yvan Goll, after Jean Racine	RTF
21 July 1950		Raymond Chevreuille	D'un diable de briquet	Chevreuille, after Hans Christian Andersen	Belgian radio
3 October 1950		Ildebrando Pizzetti	Ifigenia	Pizzetti and A. Perrini	RAI
15 November 1950		Nino Rota	I due timidi (The Two Timid Ones)	Suso Cecchi d'Amico	RAI
21 August 1951		Rezső Kókai	Lészen ágyú (There shall be guns)	Péter Halász and József Romhányi	Magyar Rádió
11 October 1951	1950	Renzo Bossi	Il principe felice (The Happy Prince)	Bossi, after Oscar Wilde	RAI
19 November 1951		Hans Werner Henze	Ein Landarzt	after Franz Kafka	Nordwestdeutscher Rundfunk
5 March 1952		Franz Reizenstein	Anna Kraus	Christopher Hassall	BBC Third Programme
5 May 1952		Raymond Chevreuille	L'elixir du révérend père Gaucher	Chevreuille, after Alphonse Daudet	Belgian radio
12 June 1952		Bernd Alois Zimmermann	Des Menschen Unterhaltsprozeß gegen Gott (The People's Maintenance Suit Against God)	Pedro Calderón de la Barca, adapted by Matthias Bungart	WDR
5 November 1952		Ildebrando Pizzetti	Cagliostro	Pizzetti	RAI
1953		Hans Vogt	Die Stadt hinter dem Strom (The City Beyond the River)	Hermann Kasack	Nordwestdeutscher Rundfunk, BBC
4 December 1953		Hans Werner Henze	Das Ende einer Welt (The End of a World)	Wolfgang Hildesheimer	Nordwestdeutscher Rundfunk
10 January 1954		Raymond Chevreuille	Atta Troll	Chevreuille, after Heinrich Heine Atta Troll, ein Sommernachtstraum	Belgian radio
24 September 1954		Henk Badings	Orestes		Florence
9 November 1954		Marcel Mihalovici	Die Heimkehr (The Homecoming)	K. H. Ruppel, after Guy de Maupassant	Hessischer Rundfunk
15 November 1954		Donald Swann, channelling Dame Hilda Tablet	Emily Butter	Henry Reed	BBC Third Programme
9 August 1955		William Alwyn	Farewell Companions	H. A. L. Craig	BBC
28 December 1955		Germaine Tailleferre	Monsieur Petit Pois achète un château	Denise Centore	Radio France
28 December 1955		Germaine Tailleferre	Le bel ambitieux	Denise Centore	Radio France
28 December 1955		Germaine Tailleferre	La pauvre Eugénie	Denise Centore	Radio France
28 December 1955		Germaine Tailleferre	La Fille d'opéra	Denise Centore	Radio France
1957		Henk Badings	Asterion		Johannesburg
28 February 1957	1956	Sven-Erik Bäck	Tranfjädrarna (The Crane Feathers)	Bertil Malmberg, after Junji Kinoshita	Swedish Radio
1957	1956	Winfried Zillig	Die Verlobung in St. Domingo (The engagement in St. Domingo)	After Heinrich von Kleist	Nordwestdeutscher Rundfunk
30 July 1959		Kurt Schwaen	Fetzers Flucht (Fetzer's Escape)		Deutscher Fernsehfunk (DDR 1)
10 November 1959		Grażyna Bacewicz	Przygoda Króla Artura (The Adventure of King Arthur)		Polish Radio
19 November 1959		Nino Rota	La notte di un nevrastenico	R. Bacchelli	RAI
12 July 1960	1959	Germaine Tailleferre	Le Maître	Eugène Ionesco	Radio France
30 September 1960	1957	Germaine Tailleferre	La petite sirène	Ph. Soupault after H. C. Andersen' "The Little Mermaid"	Radio France
1961		Niccolò Castiglioni	Attraverso lo specchio (Through the Looking-Glass)	after Lewis Carroll and also his Alice in Wonderland	RAI
1961		Piotr Perkowski	Girlandy (Garlands)		
14 February 1961		Sven-Erik Bäck	Fågeln (The Bird)	P. Verner-Carlson, after A. Obrenovic	Swedish Radio
27 August 1961		Emil Petrovics	C'est la guerre	Miklos Hubay	Hungarian Broadcasting Corporation
12 August 1962		Bruno Maderna	Don Perlimplin	Bruno Maderna, after Federico García Lorca	RAI
8 March 1964		Humphrey Searle	The Photo of the Colonel	Searle, after Eugène Ionesco	BBC
1968		Hans Ulrich Engelmann	Der Fall van Damm (The Case van Damm)	Markus Kuttner	Westdeutscher Rundfunk
16 December 1969		Bent Lorentzen	Euridice	Bent Lorentzen	DR (broadcaster)
17 May 1971		Hans Werner Henze	Der langwierige Weg in die Wohnung der Natascha Ungeheuer (The Tedious Way to Natascha Ungeheuer's Apartment)	Gaston Salvatore	RAI
1972	1970–71	Bernadetta Matuszczak	Humanae voces	after Genesis, Saint John, Mahatma Gandhi, Anne Frank, etc.	Polish Radio
1973		Tomasz Sikorski	Sinbad the Sailor	after a poem by Bolesław Leśmian	Polish Radio
1975		Otomar Kvěch	Jaro je tu (Spring Is Here) (1975)		
14 January 1977		Anthony Gilbert	The Chakravaka-Bird	after poems by Mahadevi Varma, translated by A. K. Ramanujan, Daniel H. H. Ingalls Sr. and Anthony Gilbert	BBC
1978		Otomar Kvěch	Před vánocemi (Before Christmas) (1978)		
3 July 1979	1976–77	Bernadetta Matuszczak	Apocalypsis	after Revelation	Polish Radio
1980		Otomar Kvěch	Jak přišel podzim (When Autumn Came)		
2 September 1982		Karl Aage Rasmussen	Historien om Jonas (The story of Jonah)	Poul Borum	DR
14 September 1982	1982	Thea Musgrave	An Occurrence at Owl Creek Bridge	Musgrave	BBC Radio 3
4 January 1989	1986	Nicola LeFanu	The Story of Mary O'Neill	S. McInerney	BBC
1991		Giulio Castagnoli	Al Museo in volo & a zompi (To the Museum)	Ugo Nespolo	Rai Radio 3
1996		Giulio Castagnoli	Lontananze vicino a noi	Dario Voltolini	RAI
14 April 2004		Jüri Reinvere	The Opposite Shore	Tamu Tohver, Jüri Reinvere	Eesti Raadio
8 July 2005		Amy Kohn	1, Plum Square	Amy Kohn	WNYC
9 July 2010		Robert Saxton	The Wandering Jew	Robert Saxton	BBC Radio 3

== See also ==
- Radio opera
- List of television operas
