= Barbara Cartland bibliography =

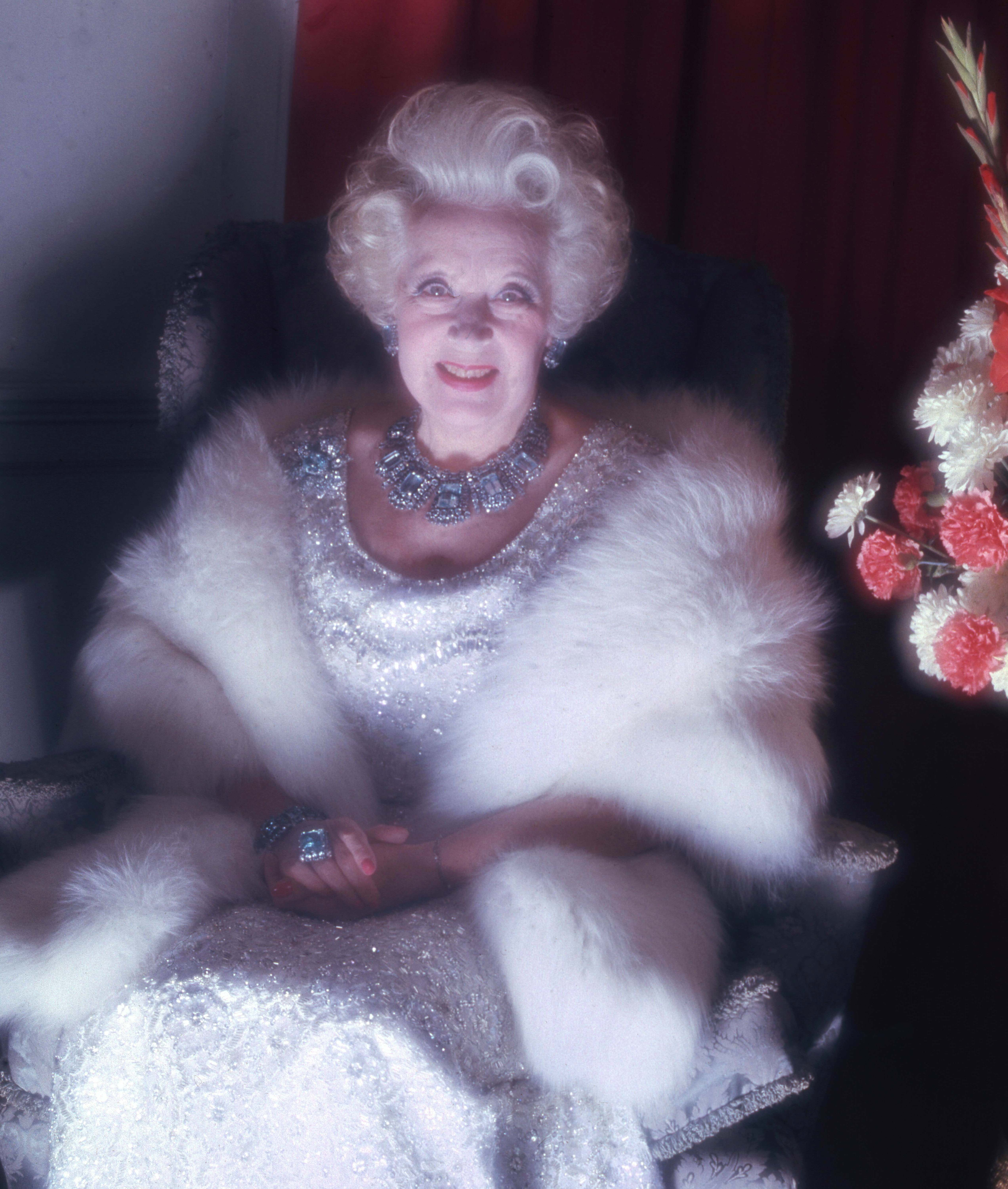
- Novels↙: 503
- Non-fiction↙: 47
- As Barbara McCorquodale↙: 18
- As Marcus Belfrey↙: 1

Dame Barbara Cartland (1901–2000) was a prolific English contemporary and historical romance novelist who published some 723 books over 72 years.

Cartland published under several pen names, including her married name Barbara McCorquodale. She also briefly published under the pen name Marcus Belfry, the pseudonym of Polish film and television actor Olek Krupa.

After her death in 2000, 160 unpublished archival manuscripts were published as the Barbara Cartland Pink Collection.

For the 2012 Diamond Jubilee of Queen Elizabeth II Cartland's publishers announced the beginning of The Eternal Collection, which re-releases works monthly. Some of Cartland's novels are re-released under different titles, and novels published under Barbara McCorquodale are re-released as Barbara Cartland.

Cartland was a columnist for the newspaper Daily Mirror before writing her publishing first novel Jig-Saw in 1925. Her last novel was published in 1997.

== As Barbara Cartland ==
=== Novels ===
Contemporary romance
Title	Date of first publication	Alternative title	Notes
Jig-Saw	1925		Written in 1920
Sawdust	1926		
If the Tree Is Saved	1929		
For What?	1930		
Sweet Punishment	1931		
A Virgin in Mayfair	1932	An Innocent in Mayfair	
Just Off Piccadilly	1933	Dance on My Heart	
Not Love Alone	1933		
A Beggar Wished	1934	A Rainbow to Heaven	
First Class, Lady?	1935	Love and Linda	
Passionate Attainment	1935		
Dangerous Experiment	1936	Search for Love	
Desperate Defiance	1936		
The Forgotten City	1936		
But Never Free	1937	The Adventurer	
Saga at Forty	1937	Love at Forty	
Broken Barriers	1938		
The Bitter Winds of Love	1938		
The Black Panther	1939	Lost Love	
The Gods Forget	1939	Love in Pity	
Stolen Halo	1940		
Now Rough-Now Smooth	1940		
Open Wings	1942		
The Leaping Flame	1943		
After the Night	1944	Towards the Stars	
The Dark Stream	1944	This Time It's Love	
Yet She Follows	1944	A Heart Is Broken	
Armour Against Love	1945		
Escape from Passion	1945		
Out of Reach	1945		
Against the Stream	1946		
Again This Rapture	1947		
If We Will	1947	Where Is Love?	
The Dream Within	1947		
No Heart is Free	1948		
The Enchanted Moment	1949		
Bewitching Women	1955		

Historical romance
Title	Date of first publication	Alternative title	Notes
The Hidden Heart	1946		
The Kiss of the Devil	1949		
The Knave of Hearts	1950	The Innocent Heiress	
The Little Pretender	1950		
A Ghost in Monte Carlo	1951		Adapted into the 1991 John Hough film A Ghost in Monte Carlo
Love is an Eagle	1951		
Cupid Rides Pillion	1952	The Secret Heart	Adapted into the 1989 film The Lady and the Highwayman
Love is the Enemy	1952		
Elizabethan Lover	1953		
Love Me for Ever	1953	Love Me Forever	
Desire of the Heart	1954		
The Enchanted Waltz	1955		
The Coin of Love	1956		
The Captive Heart	1956	The Royal Pledge	
Stars in My Heart	1957		
Sweet Adventure	1957		
The Golden Gondola	1958		
Love in Hiding	1959		
The Smuggled Heart	1959	Debt of Honor	
Love Under Fire	1960		
Messenger of Love	1961		
The Wings of Love	1962		
The Hidden Evil	1963		
The Fire of Love	1964		
The Unpredictable Bride	1964		
Love Holds the Cards	1965		
A Virgin in Paris	1966	An Innocent In Paris	
Love to the Rescue	1967		
The Enchanting Evil	1968		
Love is Contraband	1968		
The Unknown Heart	1969		
The Reluctant Bride	1970		
The Secret Fear	1970		
The Audacious Adventuress	1971		
The Pretty Horse-Breakers	1971		
The Complacent Wife	1972		
The Irresistible Buck	1972		
Lost Enchantment	1972		
The Daring Deception	1973		Bantam publisher series 1/183
The Little Adventure	1973		
The Shadow of Sin	1973		
The Wicked Marquis	1973		
The Devil in Love	1974		
A Halo for the Devil	1974		
The Cruel Count	1974		
Lessons in Love	1974		
The Dangerous Dandy	1974		
The Odious Duke	1974		
The Ruthless Rake	1974		
The Bored Bridegroom	1974		
The Penniless Peer	1974		
The Castle of Fear	1974		
No Darkness for Love	1974		
Journey to Paradise	1974		
The Magnificent Marriage	1974		
The Karma of Love	1974		
Fire on the Snow	1975		
The Flame is Love	1975		Adapted into the 1979 Michael O'Herlihy film The Flame Is Love
The Frightened Bride	1975		
The Mask of Love	1975		
A Sword to the Heart	1975		
Bewitched	1975		
The Impetuous Duchess	1975		
The Glittering Lights	1975		
Call of the Heart	1975		
A Very Naughty Angel	1975		
As Eagles Fly	1975		
Love is Innocent	1975		
The Tears of Love	1975		
Say Yes, Samantha	1975		
An Arrow of Love	1975		
A Gamble with Hearts	1975		
A Frame of Dreams	1975		
A Kiss for the King	1975		
The Elusive Earl	1976		
Fragrant Flower	1976		
Moon Over Eden	1976		
The Golden Illusion	1976		
The Husband Hunters	1976		
The Slaves of Love	1976		
No Time for Love	1976		
A Dream from the Night	1976		
Never Laugh at Love	1976		
An Angel in Hell	1976		
The Blue-eyed Witch	1976		
The Incredible Honeymoon	1976		
Passions in the Sand	1976		
The Proud Princess	1976		
The Secret of the Glen	1976		
The Wild Cry of Love	1976		
The Heart Triumphant	1976		
Hungry for Love	1976		
The Disgraceful Duke	1976		
Conquered by Love	1977		
The Dream and the Glory	1977		
The Mysterious Maid-Servant	1977		
The Magic of Love	1977		
Vote for Love	1977		
The Taming of Lady Lorinda	1977		
A Rhapsody of Love	1977	The Rhapsody of Love	
Kiss the Moonlight	1977		
Look, Listen and Love	1977		
Love Locked In	1977		
The Marquis Who Hated Women	1977		
The Castle Made for Love	1977		
The Curse of the Clan	1977		
The Dragon and the Pearl	1977		
A Touch of Love	1977		
The Outrageous Lady	1977		
Punishment of a Vixen	1977		
The Hell-Cat and the King	1977		
Love and the Loathsome Leopard	1977		
The Love Pirate	1977		
The Temptation of Torilla	1977		
The Naked Battle	1977		
The Wild, Unwilling Wife	1977		
No Escape from Love	1977		
The Sign of Love	1977		
A Duel with Destiny	1977		
A Fugitive from Love	1978		
Love, Lords and Lady-Birds	1978		
The Passion and the Flower	1978		
The Saint and the Sinner	1978		
The Twists and Turns of Love	1978		
Magic or Mirage?	1978		
Lord Ravenscar's Revenge	1978		
The Ghost Who Fell in Love	1978		
A Runaway Star	1978		
The Irresistible Force	1978		
The Judgement of Love	1978		
The Race for Love	1978		
Lovers in Paradise	1978		
A Princess in Distress	1978		
The Chieftain Without a Heart	1978		
Flowers for the God of Love	1978		
Alone in Paris	1978		
The Problems of Love	1978		
The Drums of Love	1979		
The Duke and the Preacher's Daughter	1979		
Love in the Clouds	1979		
The Prince and the Pekingese	1979		
A Serpent of Satan	1979		
Imperial Splendour	1979		
Light of the Moon	1979		
Love Climbs In	1979		
A Nightingale Sang	1979		
The Prisoner of Love	1979		
Who Can Deny Love?	1979		
The Duchess Disappeared	1979		
Love in the Dark	1979		
Terror in the Sun	1979		
Bride to the King	1979		
The Dawn of Love	1979		
A Gentleman in Love	1979		
Love Has His Way	1979		
Women Have Hearts	1979		
The Explosion of Love	1979		
Only Love	1979		
The Treasure is Love	1979		
Free from Fear	1980		
The Power and the Prince	1980		
A Heart Is Stolen	1980		
Little White Doves of Love	1980		
A Song of Love	1980		
Love for Sale	1980		
Lost Laughter	1980		
Punished with Love	1980		
Love at the Helm	1980		
The Goddess and the Gaiety Girl	1980		
The Prude and the Prodigal	1980		
Ola and the Sea Wolf	1980		
Signpost to Love	1980		
Love in the Moon	1980		
The Waltz of Hearts	1980		
From Hell to Heaven	1980		
The Horizons of Love	1980		
Pride and the Poor Princess	1980		
Lucifer and the Angel	1980		
Dreams Do Come True	1981		
A Night of Gaiety	1981		
Money, Magic and Marriage	1981		
Afraid	1981		
The Heart of the Clan	1981		
The Kiss of Life	1981		
The Lioness and the Lily	1981		
Dollars for the Duke	1981		
Gift of the Gods	1981		
The Wings of Ecstasy	1981		
Count the Stars	1981		
Enchanted	1981		
In the Arms of Love	1981		
An Innocent in Russia	1981		
A Portrait of Love	1981		
Winged Magic	1981		
Love Wins	1981		
For All Eternity	1981		
Pure and Untouched	1981		
A Shaft of Sunlight	1981		
Touch a Star	1981		
A Marriage Made in Heaven	1982		
The Poor Governess	1982		Camfield Romance series 1/150
Secret Harbour	1982		
Looking for Love	1982		
Lies for Love	1982		
Love Rules	1982		
Lucky in Love	1982		
Moments of Love	1982		
Winged Victory	1982		
A King in Love	1982		
The Call of the Highlands	1982		
Music from the Heart	1982		
Kneel for Mercy	1982		
Tempted to Love	1982		
Caught by Love	1982		
Love and the Marquis	1982		
Mission to Monte Carlo	1982		
A Miracle in Music	1982		
Riding to the Moon	1982		
From Hate to Love	1982		
Love on the Wind	1982		
Light of the Gods	1982		
The Duke Comes Home	1982		
The Vibrations of Love	1982		
Journey to a Star	1983		
Love and Lucia	1983		
The Unwanted Wedding	1983		
A Duke in Danger	1983		
Gypsy Magic	1983		
Help from the Heart	1983		
Tempted to Love	1983		
Wish for Love	1983		
Diona and Dalmatian	1983		
Fire in the Blood	1983		
Lights, Laughter and a Lady	1983		
The Unbreakable Spell	1983		
Moonlight on the Sphinx	1984		
Bride to a Brigand	1984		
A Rebel Princess	1984		Bantam publisher series 183/183
The Island of Love	1984		
Love Comes West	1984		
White Lilac	1984		
A Witch's Spell	1984		
Revenge of the Heart	1984		
Secrets	1984		
Miracle for a Madonna	1984		
The Storms of Love	1984		
Theresa and a Tiger	1984		
Love Is Heaven	1984		
A Very Unusual Wife	1984		
The Peril and the Prince	1984		
Royal Punishment	1984		
The Scots Never Forget	1984		
Alone and Afraid	1985		
Temptation of a Teacher	1985		
Look With Love	1985		
A Victory for Love	1985		
The Devilish Deception	1985		
Love Is a Gamble	1985		
Safe at Last	1985		
Paradise Found	1985		
Escape	1985		
Crowned With Love	1985		
The Devil Defeated	1985		
Listening to Love	1986	Listen to Love	
Helga in Hiding	1986		
Haunted	1986		
The Secret of the Mosque	1986		
Never Forget Love	1986		
A Dream in Spain	1986		
The Love Trap	1986		
An Angel Runs Away	1986		
Love Casts Out Fear	1986		
Love Joins the Clans	1986		
The Golden Cage	1986		
A World of Love	1986		
Dancing on a Rainbow	1986		
Forced to Marry	1986		
Bewildered in Berlin	1986		
Wanted: A Wedding Ring	1986		
The Earl Escapes	1986		
Love and Kisses	1986		
The Love Puzzle	1986		
Starlight Over Tunis	1986		
Secrets of the Heart	1986		
A Caretaker of Love	1986		
Riding to the Sky	1986	Riding in the Sky	
Lovers in Lisbon	1987		
Sapphires in Siam	1987		
A Herb for Happiness	1987	The Herb for Happiness	
Saved by Love	1987		
A Circus for Love	1987		
The Goddess of Love	1987		
The Perfume of the Gods	1987		
An Adventure of Love	1987		
Only a Dream	1987		
A Revolution of Love	1988		
The Temple of Love	1988		
A Chieftain Finds Love	1988		
The Lovely Liar	1988		
The Passionate Princess	1988		
Revenge is Sweet	1988		
Little Tongues of Fire	1988		
The Perfect Pearl	1989		
A Knight in Paris	1989		
Solita and the Spies	1989		
Love is a Maze	1989		
Love at First Sight	1989		
Paradise in Penang	1989		
The Necklace of Love	1989		
The Taming of a Tigress	1989		
The Bargain Bride	1989		
The Spirit of Love	1990		
Real Love or Fake	1990		
Kiss from a Stranger	1990		
A Game of Love	1990		
A Very Special Love	1990		
The Hunted Heart	1990	The Haunted Heart	
The Marquis Wins	1990		
Beauty or Brains?	1990		
Love Is the Key	1990		
A Miracle in Mexico	1990		
Heaven in Hong Kong	1990		
The Earl Rings a Belle	1990		
The Queen Saves a King	1991	The Queen Saves the King	
Love Lifts the Curse	1991		
Safe in Paradise	1990		
Magic from the Heart	1991		
No Disguise for Love	1991		
A Theatre of Love	1991		
Too Precious to Lose	1991		
Two Hearts in Hungary	1991		
The Magic of Paris	1991		
Hiding	1991		
The Scent of Roses	1991		
Stand and Deliver Your Heart	1991		
A Tangled Web	1991		
Just Fate	1991		
The Sleeping Princess	1991		
A Wish Comes True	1991		
Seek the Stars	1991		
A Dynasty of Love	1991		
Warned by a Ghost	1991		
Love Strikes Satan	1991	Love Strikes a Devil	
The Windmill of Love	1992		
Love and War	1992		
Drena and the Duke	1992		
A Kiss in Rome	1992		
Loved for Himself	1992		
A Coronation of Love	1992		
Hidden by Love	1992		
Walking to Wonderland	1992		
The Wicked Widow	1992		
Born of Love	1992		
Love at the Ritz	1992		
Love, Lies and Marriage	1992		
The Queen of Hearts	1992		
Fascination in France	1993		
Look with the Heart	1993		
Love in the Ruins	1993		
Terror from the Throne	1993		
This is Love	1993		
The Cave of Love	1993		
The Peaks of Ecstasy	1993		
Lucky Logan Finds Love	1993		
The Angel and the Rake	1993		
A Duel of Jewels	1993		
The Wonderful Dream	1993		
To Scotland and Love	1993		
Good or Bad?	1993		
Love and a Cheetah	1994		
Running Away to Love	1994		
The Duke's Dilemma	1994		
The Duke Finds Love	1994		
The Dare-Devil Duke	1994		
The Eyes of Love	1994		
Never Lose Love	1994		
Saved by a Saint	1994		
The Incomparable	1995		
The Innocent Imposter	1995		
The Loveless Marriage	1995		
The Patient Bridegroom	1995		
The Protection of Love	1995		
Running from Russia	1995		
Beyond the Stars	1995		
Someone to Love	1995		
Passage to Love	1995		
An Icicle in India	1995		
Three Days to Love	1996		Camfield Romance series 150/150
A Heart of Stone	1998		
The Cross of Love	2000		
Love in the Highlands	2000		
Love Finds the Way	2000		
The Castle of Love	2000		
Love is Triumphant	2000		
Stars in the Sky	2000		
The Ship of Love	2000		
A Dangerous Disguise	2000		
Love Became Theirs	2000		
Love Drives In	2000		
Sailing to Love	2000		
The Star of Love	2000		
Music is the Soul of Love	2000		
Love in the East	2000		
Theirs to Eternity	2000		
A Paradise on Earth	2000		
Love Wins in Berlin	2000		
In Search of Love	2000		
A Heart in Heaven	2000		
The House of Happiness	2000		
Royalty Defeated by Love	2000		
The White Witch	2000		
They Sought Love	2000		
Love Is The Reason For Living	2000		
They Found Their Way to Heaven	2000		
Learning to Love	2000		
Journey to Happiness	2000		
A Kiss in the Desert	2000		
The Heart of Love	2000		
Danger in the Desert	2004		
The Richness of Love	2007		
For Ever and Ever	2007		
An Unexpected Love	2007		
Saved by an Angel	2007		
Touching the Stars	2007		
Seeking Love	2007		
Journey to Love	2007		
Love by the Lake	2007		
A Dream Come True	2008		
The King without a Heart	2008		
The Waters of Love	2008		
Danger to the Duke	2008		
A Perfect Way to Heaven	2008		
Follow Your Heart	2008		
Rivals for Love	2008		
A Kiss from the Heart	2008		
Lovers in London	2008		
This Way to Heaven	2008		
A Princess Prays	2008		
Mine For Ever	2009		
The Earl's Revenge	2009		
Love at the Tower	2009		
Ruled by Love	2009		
Love came from Heaven	2009		
Love and Apollo	2009		
The Key of Love	2009		
A Castle of Dreams	2009		
A Battle of Brains	2009		
A Change of Hearts	2009		
It is Love	2009		
Wanted - A Royal Wife	2010		
A Kiss of Love	2010		
To Heaven with Love	2010		
Pray For Love	2010		
The Marquis is Trapped	2010		
Hide and Seek for Love	2010		
Hiding from Love	2010		
A Teacher of Love	2010		
Money or Love	2010		
The Revelation is Love	2010		
The Tree of Love	2010		
The Magnificent Marquis	2010		
The Castle	2011		
The Gates of Paradise	2011		
A Lucky Star	2011		

A Saga of Hearts
Title	Date of first publication	Notes
A Hazard of Hearts	1949	Adapted into the 1987 film A Hazard of Hearts
A Duel of Hearts	1949	Adapted into the 1991 film Duel of Hearts

=== Non-fiction ===
Title	Date of first publication	Alternative title	Notes
Touch the Stars: A Clue to Happiness	1935		
Etiquette Handbook	1950	Book of Etiquette, Etiquette for Love and Romance	
Love, Life and Sex	1957		
Look Lovely, Be Lovely	1958		
Husbands and Wives	1961	Love and Marriage	
The Many Facets of Love	1963		
Sex and the Teenager	1964		
Woman the Enigma	1965		
Book of Charm	1965		
The Youth Secret	1968		
Book of Beauty and Health	1972		
Lines on Life and Love	1972		Poetry
Recipes for Lovers	1977		
Book of Useless Information	1977		
Book of Love and Lovers	1978		
The Light of Love	1979		
Scrapbook	1980		
Romantic Royal Marriages	1981		
Keep Young & Beautiful	1982		Collaboration with Elinor Glyn
Written with Love	1982		
Book of Celebrities	1982		
Getting Older, Growing Younger	1984		
Book of Health	1985		
Year of Royal Days	1989		
Guide to Romance Writing	2000		
Barbara Cartland On Romance Writing	2002		

Biographies
Title	Date of first publication	Alternative titles	Notes
Ronald Cartland	1942	My Brother Ronald	Biography of Ronald Cartland
The Fascinating Forties	1954		
Polly, My Wonderful Mother	1956		Biography of Cartland's mother Mary "Polly" Hamilton Scobell Cartland
The Outrageous Queen: A Biography of Christina of Sweden	1956		Biography of Christina of Sweden
The Scandalous Life of King Carol	1957	Royal Eccentrics	Biography of Carol II of Romania
The Private Life of Charles II: The Women He Loved	1958		Biography of Charles II of England
The Private Life of Elizabeth Empress of Austria	1959	Royal Jewels	Biography of Elisabeth of Bavaria
Josephine, Empress of France	1961		Biography of Josephine Tascher de La Pagerie
Diane De Poitiers	1962	Royal Lovers	Biography of Diane de Poitiers
Metternich: The Passionate Diplomat	1964		Biography of Klemens von Metternich
I Search for Rainbows	1967		Autobiography
We Danced All Night	1971		Autobiography
I Seek the Miraculous	1978		Autobiography
I Reach for the Stars	1994		Autobiography

The Years of War Study
Title	Date of first publication
The Isthmus Years: 1919-1939	1943
The Years of Opportunity: 1939-1949	1947

Food
Title	Date of first publication
Vitamins for Vitality	1959
The Magic of Honey	1970
Health Food Cookery Book	1971
Food for Love	1975
The Romance of Food	1984

== As Barbara McCorquodale ==
Novels
Title	Date of first publication	Notes
Sleeping Swords	1942	Political novel
Love is Mine	1952	
The Passionate Pilgrim	1952	
Blue Heather	1953	
Wings on My Heart	1954	
The Kiss of Paris	1956	
Love Forbidden	1957	
The Thief of Love	1957	
Lights of Love	1958	
Sweet Enchantress	1958	
A Kiss of Silk	1959	
The Price is Love	1960	
The Runaway Heart	1961	
A Light to the Heart	1962	
Love Is Dangerous	1963	
Danger by the Nile	1964	
Love on the Run	1965	
Theft of a Heart	1966	

== As Marcus Belfrey ==
Novels
Title	Date of first publication
Apocalypse of the Heart	1995
