= The City beyond the River =

Novel by German writer Hermann Kasack, published in 1947

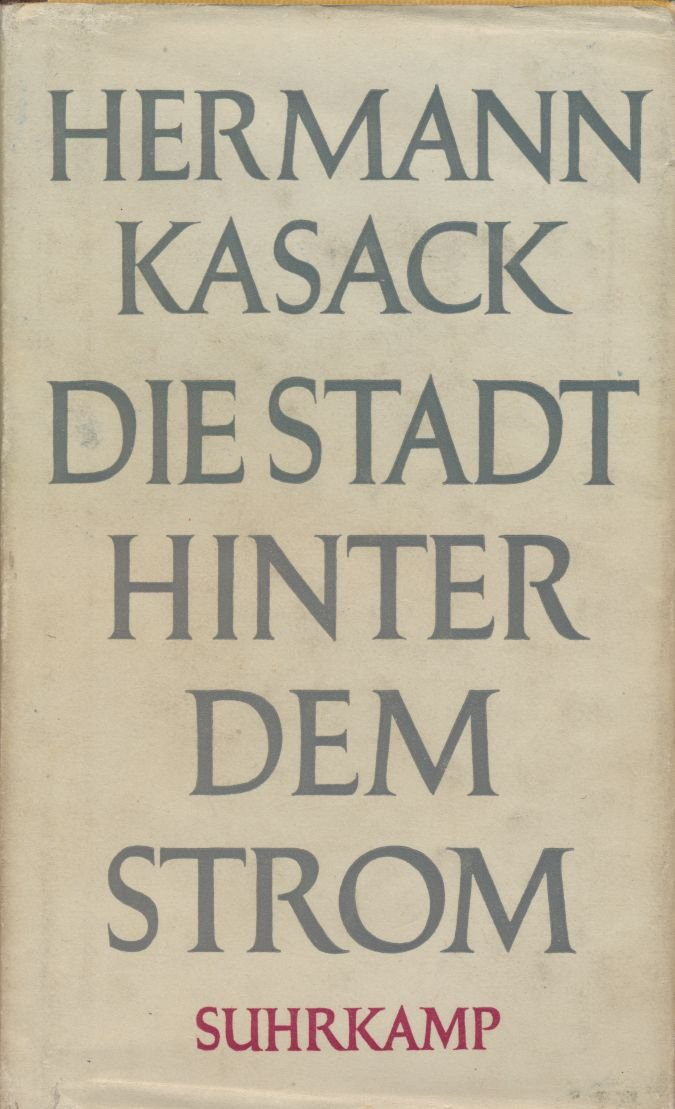
- Author: Hermann Kasack
- Original title: Die Stadt hinter dem Strom
- Translator: Peter de Mendelssohn
- Language: German
- Genre: Novel
- Publisher: Der Tagesspiegel, Suhrkamp Verlag
- Publication date: 1946
- Publication place: Germany (US zone)
- English publication date: 1953
- Pages: 599

The City beyond the River (German: Die Stadt hinter dem Strom) is a novel by the German Hermann Kasack, published in Der Tagesspiegel in 1946 and in a longer book version by Suhrkamp Verlag in Berlin in 1947.

== History ==
Hermann Kasack described a "Schreckensvision" (horror vision) initiating the writing of the novel: "'Ich sah die Flächen einer gespenstischen Ruinenstadt, die sich ins Unendliche verlor und in der sich die Menschen wie Scharen von gefangenen Puppen bewegten." (I saw a vast ruined city, extending endlessly, in which people moved about like imprisoned puppets). Kasack wrote the novel in two periods, first during the war from 1942 to 1944, then after the war in 1946. Kasack had not left Nazi Germany, but remained in what was later described as "Innere Emigration" (inner emigration). He shows the individual, helpless in an incomprehensible society, questioning existence.

Kasack's fictional vision of a city shows similarities to Ernst Jünger's Heliopolis.

== Plot ==
The protagonist is the orientalist Dr. Robert Lindhoff, introduced to the reader just as Robert. He travels by railroad on a mission which is unclear to him to a foreign city, which appears as strange and incomprehensible. He meets people whom he believes to be dead, such as his father and his beloved Anna.

Robert receives the order from an invisible authority of the city to write a "Chronik" (chronicle) of the city. Robert is called the Chronicler, and he explores the city, partly on his own, partly guided. The city is a megalopolis under a cloudless sky, full of catacombs, without music. Its people appear more and more strange and incomprehensible to him. The people resemble shadows and perform senseless, repetitive and destructive tasks. Two factories employ many of them, one producing building blocks from dust, one destroying building blocks to dust. Robert feels unable to write the chronicle. The authority who ordered it thanks him anyway for his work full of insight.

Back in his home country, Robert travels restlessly, lecturing on the sense of life. In the end he travels to the city, as in the beginning.

== Publication ==
A shortened version of the novel was published in the Berlin newspaper Der Tagesspiegel in 1946 before the complete novel was published in 1947. The first translation to English by Peter de Mendelssohn was published in 1953 by Longman in London and New York. A revised version of 1956 was published in 1960.

Editions in German

- Berlin 1946, shortened version in Der Tagesspiegel
- Berlin 1947
- Frankfurt am Main 1960, Suhrkamp, revised version of 1956
- München/Zürich 1964, Knaur paperback
- Frankfurt am Main 1983, Suhrkamp, Weiße Reihe
- Frankfurt am Main 1988, Suhrkamp, volume 296 of Bibliothek Suhrkamp
- Leipzig 1989

Translations

- Staden bortom floden, Stockholm 1950
- La ville au delà du fleuve, Paris 1951
- La città oltre il fiume, Milano 1952
- Kaupunki virran takana, Helsinki 1952
- The city beyond the river, London, New York, Toronto 1953
- Byen og elven, Oslo 1954
- La ciudad detras del rio, Buenos Aires
- Город за рекой, Moscow 1992
- 大河背后的城市 Chinese translation of the book, Chongqing 2023
- 강물 뒤의 도시 Korean translation of the book, Seoul 1984
- 流れの背後の市 Japanese translation of the book, 1954

== Reception ==
The novel was well received and soon translated to several languages.

It is considered one of the most important novels written in Germany after World War II, dealing with the horrors of Nazi Germany, along with works such as Thomas Mann's Doctor Faustus and Günter Grass' The Tin Drum.

In 1949 Kasack was awarded the Fontane Prize of the city of Berlin for this work. He was the first recipient of this prize.

== Adaptation ==
Kasack himself used the novel as the base for an opera libretto. The work Die Stadt hinter dem Strom, termed an "Oratorische Oper" (Oratorio Opera), by Hans Vogt was premiered at the Hessisches Staatstheater Wiesbaden in 1955.

== Literature ==
- Hermann Kasack: Die Stadt hinter dem Strom. Eine Selbstkritik, Die Welt, No. 142, 29 November 1947, p. 2 (in German)
- Wolfgang Kasack: Hermann Kasack. "Die Stadt hinter dem Strom" in der Kritik. Eine Bibliographie der wichtigsten Aufsätze und Besprechungen., Württembergische Landesbibliothek Stuttgart, 1952 (in German)
- Lothar Fietz: Strukturelemente der hermetischen Romane Thomas Manns, Hermann Hesses, Hermann Brochs und Hermann Kasacks, Deutsche Vierteljahresschrift für Literaturwissenschaft und Geistesgeschichte 40, 1966, p. 161-183 (in German)
- Ehrhard Bahr: Metaphysische Zeitdiagnose: Hermann Kasack, Elisabeth Langgässer und Thomas Mann, in: Gegenwartsliteratur und Drittes Reich, H. Wagner, Stuttgart 1977, p. 133-162 (in German)
- Gene O. Stimpson: Zwischen Mystik und Naturwissenschaften. Hermann Kasacks "Die Stadt hinter dem Strom" im Lichte des neuen Paradigmas, Europäische Hochschulschriften, Reihe 1 - 1503, Frankfurt am Main 1995 (in German)
- Mathias Bertram: Literarische Epochendiagnosen der Nachkriegszeit, in: Deutsche Erinnerung. Berliner Beiträge zur Prosa der Nachkriegsjahre (1945-1960), Ursula Heukenkamp, Berlin 2000, p. 11-100 (in German)
- Hermann Kasack: Die Stadt hinter dem Strom. Essay in German: www.Signaturen-Magazin.de
