= Blennerhassett (opera) =

Radio opera by Vittorio Giannini

Blennerhassett is a brief radio opera in one act by American composer Vittorio Giannini with a libretto by Phillip Roll and Norman Corwin. It was commissioned by CBS Radio as part of the Columbia Composers Commission, following the success of Giannini's earlier radio opera Beauty and the Beast. It received its premiere in a radio broadcast on 2 November 1939. Blennerhassett was subsequently performed in several staged and concert productions, including a 1991 semi-staged concert performance in New York City by American Chamber Opera. A performance of the opera generally lasts less than thirty minutes, although the 1991 production added a 10-minute prelude set in a radio studio which reenacted the pre-broadcast preparation for the original premiere.

== Roles ==
- Stephen – tenor
- Madeleine – soprano
- General Wilkinson – baritone
- Anne – mezzo-soprano
- Mrs. Field – contralto
- A messenger – tenor

== Synopsis ==
The opera is set on Blennerhassett Island, named for Harman Blennerhassett, a figure in the Aaron Burr conspiracy. The plot centers on Stephen, a young follower of Aaron Burr, and his fiancée, Madeleine. Stephen gathers a band of men on the island and plans to join Burr's forces. When Madeleine unwittingly reveals the secret plan to General Wilkinson, he sets the militia on Stephen and his men. In the ensuing battle, Stephen is mortally wounded. He survives long enough to return to Madeleine and then dies in her arms.

== See also ==
- List of radio operas
