= Die Stadt hinter dem Strom (opera) =

1955 opera by Hans Vogt

- Oratorio-opera by Hans Vogt
- Translation: The City Beyond the River
- Librettist: Hermann Kasack
- Language: German
- Based on: Die Stadt hinter dem Strom by Kasack
- Premiere: 3 May 1955; Hessisches Staatstheater Wiesbaden

Die Stadt hinter dem Strom (The City Beyond the River) is a German-language oratorio-opera in three acts composed by Hans Vogt to a libretto by Hermann Kasack based on his 1947 dystopian novel Die Stadt hinter dem Strom.

== Background and performance history ==
Die Stadt hinter dem Strom was Vogt's first opera, originally conceived as a radio opera. The librettist was Hermann Kasack, the author of the novel on which the opera is based. Kasack had written Die Stadt hinter dem Strom in 1942, 1943 and 1946, dealing with the horrors of the world wars. He imagined a ruined city with characters who resemble humans but act like puppets.

The "Oratorische Oper" (oratorio opera) premiered on Nordwestdeutscher Rundfunk and BBC Radio in 1952. Vogt later revised the work for the stage. It was first performed as a live theatre piece at the Hessisches Staatstheater Wiesbaden on 3 May 1955 as part of the Internationale Maifestspiele Wiesbaden.

Vogt had collaborated with the librettist Hermann Kasack and also with the publisher and musicologist Fritz Oeser. In an obituary for Oeser authored by Vogt, he recalled that Oeser had requested him to come to Wiesbaden to change the Chorprolog (choral prologue) and address a missing climax in one of the act 3 scenes and promised to pay for the change.

The libretto was published by Suhrkamp Verlag in 1955. A recording of the work by the Hamburg State Radio was broadcast on BBC Radio 3 on April 28, 1957.
