= Mark Lubbock =

British composer (1898–1986)

Mark Hugh Lubbock (17 November 1898 – 10 November 1986) was a British conductor and composer, especially of operetta and light music.

== Life ==
Lubbock was born in Downe, Kent, the son of Hugh Nevile Lubbock and Margaret Tiarks. His grandfather was the Kent county cricketer Sir Nevile Lubbock, and his cousin was the politician Eric Lubbock, 4th Baron Avebury. He was educated at Eton College, and later in Dresden. He also served in World War I with the Royal Artillery and the Labour Corps.

He began his career as a singer in the choruses of several musical comedies, making his conducting debut with theatrical touring companies in 1920, initially with the Shaftesbury Theatre. The earnings from this funded his study period in Dresden, where he also became a répétiteur and assistant conductor to Kurt Striegler. In 1933, he and Harry S. Pepper were recruited by the BBC, both being noted as "established composers of light music". Lubbock was the BBC's Light Music Conductor from 1933 to 1944, replacing Stanford Robinson.

On 15 January 1930 he married the writer Bea Howe, author of the group biography A Galaxy of Governesses (1954), regular contributor to Country Life and a close friend of Sylvia Townsend Warner. They lived in Kensington, London and at The Old Forge, Althorne in Essex. Lubbock also had a relationship with the actress Barbara Shotter (sister of Winifred Shotter), with whom he had a daughter.

Lubbock appeared as a castaway on the BBC Radio programme Desert Island Discs on 15 June 1974.

== Works ==
His 1931 operetta The King Can Do No Wrong was one of the first to be commissioned and broadcast by the BBC specifically for radio broadcast. It was one of at least 12 musical comedies he wrote in collaboration with the playwright and BBC producer C. Denis Freeman, including Seat in Hyde Park (1931), His Majesty Proclaims, Fame in a Night, Uplift, Wonderful Weekend (1932) and The Castle on the Hill (1933). A later radio operetta was The Rose and the Violet (1942), with book and lyrics by Barbara Cartland, set against the Edwardian background of Rotten Row.

His other compositions include light orchestral pieces such as Fiesta, Polka Dots, and Saltarello. One such piece, Moon Lullaby, was featured in "Arrival", the first episode of cult classic television series The Prisoner. In addition, Lubbock wrote songs such as A Smuggler's Song, Blackbird in the Apple Tree, Dance Again, Lullaby River, The Whispering Poplar, and Winter Rose. He also wrote the incidental music for the 1952 London production of An Italian Straw Hat at the Old Vic.

In 1962 Lubbock published a reference work, The Complete Book of Light Opera, a book of synopses conceived as a companion to Kobbé with an American section by David Ewen.
