= Matuszczak =

Matuszczak is a surname. Notable people with the surname include:

- Bernadetta Matuszczak (1937–2021), Polish composer
- Walter Matuszczak (1918–2001), American football player

== See also ==
- Matuszczyk
