= The Mikado (1939 film) =

1939 film by Victor Schertzinger

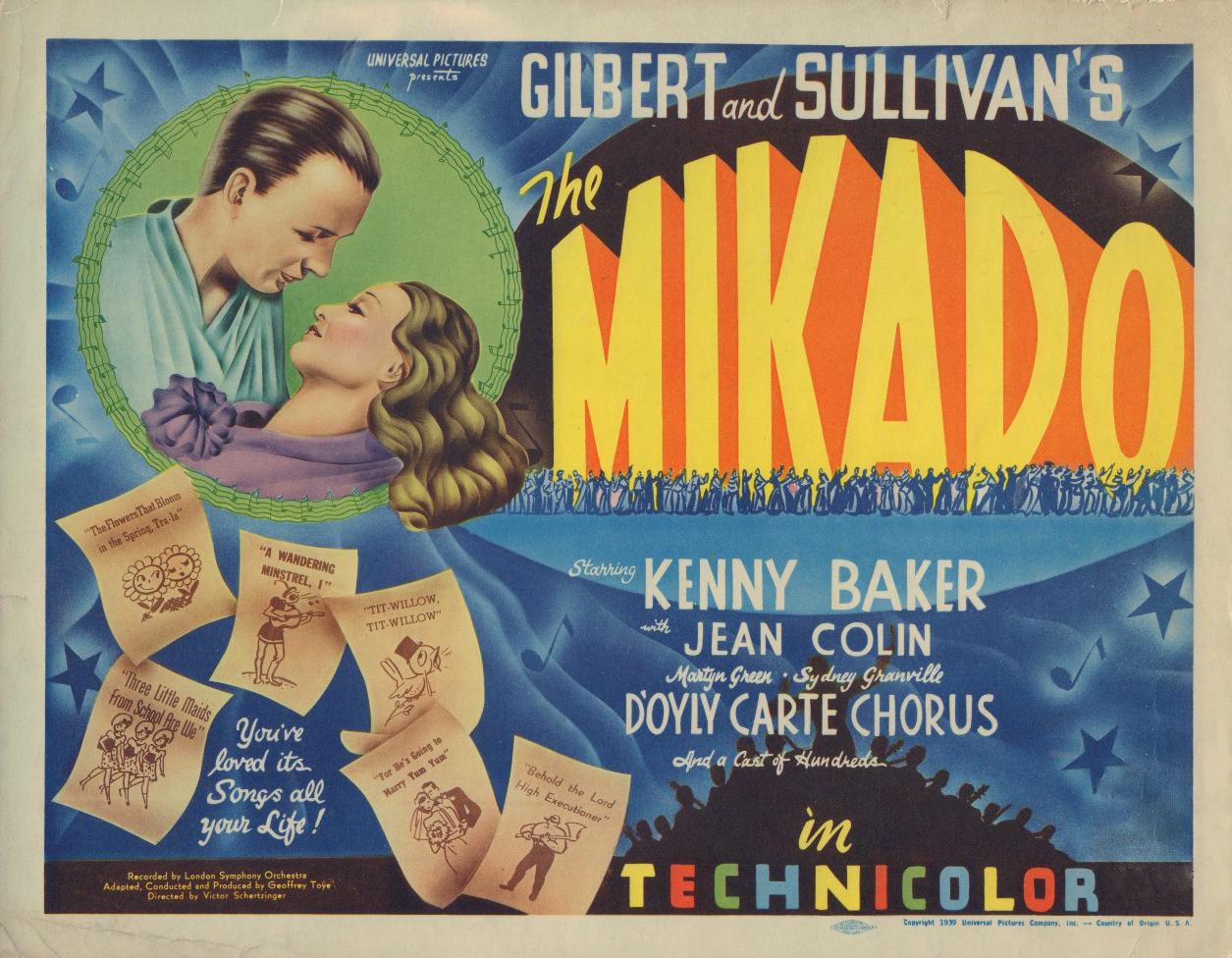
- Lobby card for the film
- Directed by: Victor Schertzinger
- Written by: Geoffrey Toye (adaptation)
- Based on: The Mikado by: W.S. Gilbert; Arthur Sullivan
- Produced by: Geoffrey Toye
- Starring: Kenny Baker; Martyn Green; Sydney Granville; John Barclay
- Cinematography: Bernard Knowles, William V. Skall
- Edited by: Philip Charlot; Gene Milford
- Music by: Arthur Sullivan
- Production companies: G and S Films (uncredited)
- Distributed by: General Film Distributors Ltd (UK); Universal Pictures (US)
- Release dates: 12 January 1939 (UK); 1 May 1939 (US)
- Running time: 90 minutes
- Country: United Kingdom
- Language: English
- Budget: £158,319

The Mikado is a 1939 British musical comedy film based on Gilbert and Sullivan's 1885 comic opera The Mikado. Directed by Victor Schertzinger and shot in Technicolor, the film stars Martyn Green as Ko-Ko, Sydney Granville as Pooh-Bah, the American singer Kenny Baker as Nanki-Poo and Jean Colin as Yum-Yum. In addition to Green and Granville, many of the other leads and choristers, as well as the film's conductor and adapter, Geoffrey Toye, were or had been members of the D'Oyly Carte Opera Company.

== Plot ==
At the court of the Mikado, the emperor orders his son, Nanki-Poo, to marry Katisha, an elderly courtier, or perish on the scaffold. Nanki-Poo flees and disguises himself as a poor minstrel. Later, in the town of Titipu, he inquires about his beloved, a schoolgirl called Yum-Yum, who is a ward of Ko-Ko (formerly a cheap tailor). A gentleman, Pish-Tush, explains that when the Mikado decreed that flirting was a capital crime, the Titipu authorities frustrated the decree by appointing Ko-Ko, a prisoner condemned to death for flirting, to the post of Lord High Executioner. Since Ko-Ko was next to be decapitated, the town authorities reasoned that he could "not cut off another's head until he cut his own off", and since Ko-Ko was not likely to execute himself, no executions could take place. All of the town's officials except the haughty nobleman, Pooh-Bah, proved too proud to serve under an ex-tailor, and they resigned, so Pooh-Bah now holds all their posts. Pooh-Bah informs Nanki-Poo that Yum-Yum is scheduled to marry Ko-Ko later that very day.

Nanki-Poo informs Ko-Ko of his love for Yum-Yum. Ko-Ko sends him away, but Nanki-Poo manages to meet with his beloved and reveals to her that he is the son and heir of the Mikado, in disguise to avoid the amorous advances of Katisha. Pish-Tush arrives with news that the Mikado has decreed that unless an execution is carried out in Titipu within a month, the town will be reduced to the rank of a village, which would bring "irretrievable ruin". Pooh-Bah and Pish-Tush point to Ko-Ko as the obvious choice for beheading, since he was already under sentence of death. Ko-Ko discovers that Nanki-Poo, in despair over losing Yum-Yum, is preparing to commit suicide. They make a bargain: Nanki-Poo will marry Yum-Yum for one month and will then be executed. Ko-Ko will then marry the young widow.

Everyone arrives to celebrate Nanki-Poo and Yum-Yum's union, but the festivities are interrupted by the arrival of Katisha, who has come to claim Nanki-Poo as her husband. However, the townspeople drown out Katisha's attempts to reveal Nanki-Poo's secret. Katisha declares that she intends to be avenged.

As Yum-Yum prepares for her wedding, Ko-Ko and Pooh-Bah discover a twist in the law that states that when a married man is beheaded for flirting, his wife must be buried alive. Yum-Yum is unwilling to marry under these circumstances, and so Nanki-Poo invites Ko-Ko to behead him on the spot. The soft-hearted Ko-Ko cannot execute Nanki-Poo. Ko-Ko instead sends Nanki-Poo and Yum-Yum away to be wed.

The Mikado and Katisha arrive in Titipu accompanied by a large procession. The Mikado describes his system of justice. Ko-Ko assumes that the ruler has come to see whether an execution has been carried out. Aided by Pooh-Bah and his ward Pitti-Sing, he graphically describes the supposed execution and hands the Mikado the certificate of death. The Mikado notes that he is searching for his son, Nanki-Poo. Hearing the name, the three panic. Katisha reads the death certificate with horror: the person executed was Nanki-Poo. The Mikado discusses with Katisha the statutory punishment "for compassing the death of the heir apparent" to the Imperial throne. With the three conspirators facing painful execution, Ko-Ko pleads with Nanki-Poo to reveal himself to his father. Nanki-Poo fears that Katisha will demand his execution if she finds he is alive; he suggests that if Katisha could be persuaded to marry Ko-Ko, then Nanki-Poo could safely "come to life again", as Katisha would have no claim on him.

Ko-Ko finds Katisha mourning her loss and throws himself on her mercy. He begs for her hand in marriage, saying that he has long harboured a passion for her. Katisha is soon moved by his story of a bird who died of heartbreak. They quickly marry, and she begs for the Mikado's mercy for Ko-Ko and his accomplices. Nanki-Poo and Yum-Yum then reappear, sparking Katisha's fury. The Mikado is astonished that Nanki-Poo is alive. Ko-Ko explains that when a royal command for an execution is given, the victim is, legally speaking, "as good as dead ... and if he is dead, why not say so?" The Mikado declares that "Nothing could possibly be more satisfactory", and everyone in Titipu celebrates.

== Cast ==
- Kenny Baker as Nanki-Poo
- Martyn Green as Ko-Ko
- Sydney Granville as Pooh-Bah
- John Barclay as the Mikado
- Gregory Stroud as Pish-Tush
- Jean Colin as Yum-Yum
- Constance Willis as Katisha
- Elizabeth Nickell-Lean (credited as Elizabeth Paynter) as Pitti-Sing
- Kathleen Naylor as Peep-Bo
- Chorus of the D'Oyly Carte Opera Company

== Production ==
The music was conducted by Geoffrey Toye, a former D'Oyly Carte music director, who was also the producer and was credited with the adaptation, which involved a number of cuts, additions and re-ordered scenes. Victor Schertzinger directed. Art direction and costume designs were by Marcel Vertès. The orchestra (and the musicians depicted in the film) consisted of 40 members of the London Symphony Orchestra.

== Release ==
The film premiered in London on 12 January 1939 before its release in the United States on 1 May. A decade later, on 23 July 1949, it was re-released in New York City.

== See also ==
- The Mikado (1967 film)
