= Mr. Dodd Takes the Air =

1937 film by Alfred E. Green

- Directed by: Alfred E. Green
- Written by: William Wister Haines; Elaine Ryan
- Based on: The Great Crooner; 1933 novel by Clarence Budington Kelland
- Produced by: Mervyn LeRoy
- Starring: Kenny Baker; Frank McHugh; Alice Brady
- Cinematography: Arthur Edeson
- Edited by: Thomas Richards
- Music by: Harry Warren; Adolph Deutsch (uncredited)
- Production company: Warner Bros. Pictures
- Distributed by: Warner Bros. Pictures
- Release date: August 21, 1937
- Running time: 87 minutes
- Country: United States
- Language: English

Mr. Dodd Takes the Air is a 1937 American musical comedy film directed by Alfred E. Green. Composer Harry Warren and lyricist Al Dubin were nominated at the 10th Academy Awards in the category of Best Song for "Remember Me".

== Plot summary ==
A small town electrician becomes a hit singer in New York after being asked to sing for a local radio program. There he gets involved with a gold digger, a thief, an opera singer and a woman he falls in love with. After suffering from bronchitis, he sings in another voice to stay on the air, but then is called a fake.

== Cast ==
- Kenny Baker as Claude L. Dodd
- Frank McHugh as 'Sniffer' Sears
- Alice Brady as Mme. Sonia Moro
- Gertrude Michael as Jessica Stafford
- Jane Wyman as Marjorie Day
- John Eldredge as Jim Lidin
- Henry O'Neill as D.M. Gateway
- Harry Davenport as Doc Jeremiah George Quinn
- Ferris Taylor as Hiram P. Doremus
- Linda Perry as Information Desk Girl
- Florence Gill As Miss Carrie Bowers (Uncredited)

== Production ==
This was the starring debut for Kenny Baker, a popular radio singer at the time.

== Reception ==
=== Critical ===
Motion Picture Herald gave the film a strong review and wrote that it was "A lively show with the kind of love interest most persons like to see, containing music that is well worked in and melodrama with a hokum tinge, it has a lot of entertainment and showmanship material." Kenny Baker, in his film debut, was well received with the comment that he was "A boy to be watched, [and] on the strength of this picture, it can be expected that he will be entrusted with greater responsibilities."

=== Accolades ===
Although nominated for the at the 10th Academy Awards in the category of Best Original Song, the film was retrospectively judged a "minor musical comedy".m
