= The Lady and the Highwayman =

1988 British TV movie

- Based on: Cupid Rides Pillion by Barbara Cartland
- Screenplay by: Terence Feely
- Directed by: John Hough
- Starring: Hugh Grant; Lysette Anthony
- Music by: Laurie Johnson
- Country of origin: United Kingdom
- Original language: English

Production
- Executive producer: Sir Lew Grade
- Producers: Albert Fennell; John Hough; Peter Manley
- Cinematography: Terry Cole
- Running time: 90 minutes

Original release
- Release: 1988

The Lady and the Highwayman is a 1988 United Kingdom romantic adventure television film based on Barbara Cartland's 1952 romance novel Cupid Rides Pillion. The working title of the film was Dangerous Love.

The film stars Hugh Grant (in one of his earliest appearances) as highwayman Silver Blade and Lysette Anthony as Lady Panthea Vyne. The film is a swashbuckling tale of romance, jealousy, and betrayal set in England during the Restoration of Charles II, with Michael York as King Charles II of England. Emma Samms as Lady Castlemaine and Oliver Reed are supported by guest appearances by Robert Morley and John Mills. The Lady Castlemaine of the film, whose vendetta against Lady Panthea Vyne forms part of the plot of the film, is based on the life of Barbara Palmer, 1st Duchess of Cleveland, one of King Charles II's mistresses and mother of several of his children.

In 2023 Grant told James Corden that The Lady and The Highwayman was the film he would erase from his Internet Movie Database (IMDb) page if given the chance. "I'm meant to be sexy" he recalled, but was undone by the "bad wig, bad hat. I look like Deputy Dawg."

== Plot ==
The film begins with a narrator telling the viewer that Cromwell's tyranny is coming to an end, as several men approach on horseback. King Charles II and several of his Cavaliers have been on an exploratory tour in England, checking to see if the populace is ready to back his return, and the king is being hounded by a troop of Roundheads. King Charles stops to bid one of his supporters, a Royalist Lord Lucius Vyne (Hugh Grant), who he gives one of his favorite rings, telling Lucius to send it if he ever needs his help. Taking the ring, Lucius borrows the King's distinctive plumed hat and leads the King's pursuers away, allowing Charles and Lucius' cousin, Lord Richard Vyne, to reach a waiting boat bound for France. Lucius manages to lose the Roundheads in a cavernous entrance of a quarried chalk cliff face.

In the next scene Lady Panthea Vyne (Lysette Anthony) is tricked into marriage by a lecherous older tax collector Drysdale (Ian Bannen) who had been seeking her hand in marriage. He promises to intercede and save her brother Lord Richard who, he tells her, is about to be executed. Drysdale tells her he can save her brother if she agrees to marry him. Leaving the church she and her new husband, no sooner reach their waiting coach that he attempts to unbutton her dress. Her small Cavalier King Charles Spaniel barks at Drysdale, who throws it to the floor of the coach and stomps it to death. Just then a gun ball blows a chunk of wood from the coach beside Drysdale's head. The mysterious masked highwayman known as "Silver Blade" (secretly her cousin Lucius) puts a stop to Drysdale's advances and helps our heroine to bury her dog. She tells Silver Blade of her plight; he whispers that Drysdale has lied, telling her that her brother is already dead.

"Silver Blade" then duels with Drysdale, who Panthea warns Silver Blade is the best swordsman in England. Silver Blade soon runs him through and returns to the carriage where Panthea waits. Silver Blade finds gold in the carriage that Drysdale had unfairly collected during his role as a tax collector. He threatens the coachmen on pain of death to keep silent about the whole affair with Drysdale then takes Panthea home. He leaves her with two of the four bags of gold before riding off to return the rest of the money from whom it was stolen. The event will come back to haunt them both.

Next her aunt, Lady Emma Darlington (Claire Bloom) talks her into coming to live with her as Panthea is all alone now that her father and brother are dead, nevermind her dead husband. At a royal reception we learn that Aunt Emma was the King's 'second' mother. The King invites Panthea to be a lady of the queen's bed chamber. With Panthea attracting all of the males' admiring glances plus her now becoming part of the new queen's court, the King's mistress Lady Castlemaine (Emma Samms) is livid. About then Panthea asks her Aunt who is 'that' lady, pointing to Lady Castlemaine. Her aunt tells her to look away.

Next Lady Castlemaine's guest Rudolph introduces himself, reminding Panthea and her aunt that he is Panthea's cousin on her distaff side. He then introduces Lady Castlemaine, when suddenly Lady Darlington grabs Panthea and abruptly turns her back and walks away. Lady Castlemaine is fit to be tied, and swears to take revenge for the slight.

Cousin Rudolph plots to inherit the title as Duke of Manston Hall, which is Panthea's home and also Lucius' hiding place. Lucius, instead of claiming his royal title, in true Robin Hood fashion is working against the King's secret enemies. Panthea, who has been in love with Silver Blade since the day he saved her, learns he is in grave danger and is about to be captured in a trap set for that night. She rides to warn him and saves the day after declaring her love for him. However, soon after the King leaves for France, she falls victim to the schemes of Lady Castlemaine who is after her head. Meanwhile, Lady Castlemaine learns of the coach incident and pays the coachman, now a sergeant in the King's Guards, to accuse Panthea of murder. She sets her trap and soon Panthea is fighting for her life in court.

After she is condemned to death Lucius attempts her rescue and ends up arrested as well. He passes the King's ring to Panthea's maid, telling her to take it to the King, but Rudolph sees the sparkling ring and takes it from Lucius. On the morning of his execution Lucius tricks his jailer, and he and his men fight their way out of their jail and ride to the Tower of London to Panthea's rescue. As the hulking Axeman is in mid swing, an arrow from Lucius strikes his shoulder, causing his blow to miss Panthea's head, but Lucius and Panthea are surrounded; escape is seemingly impossible, but meanwhile in an amazing Deus Ex Machina, the plodding Rudolph, who can't wait till he is sure Lucius is dead, barges in before the King and demands to be declared the Duke of Manston Hall. The King, who has seemingly forgotten his friend, spies the ring and soon shows up at the tower, just in time to save the day.

Lucius and Panthea are married and all ends well.

== Cast ==
- Oliver Reed - Sir Philip Gage
- Claire Bloom - Lady Emma Darlington
- Christopher Cazenove - Rudolph Vyne
- Lysette Anthony - Lady Panthea Vyne
- Hugh Grant - Lucius Vyne/Silver Blade
- Michael York - King Charles II of England
- Emma Samms - Barbara Castlemaine
- John Mills - Sir Lawrence Dobson
- Ian Bannen - Lord Christian Drysdale
- Robert Morley - Lord Chancellor
- Lamya Derval - The Queen
- Bernard Miles - Judge
- Gareth Hunt - Stangret/Sergeant Potter
- Steffanie Pitt - Martha
- Floyd Bevan - Jack
- James Booth - Robbery victim
- Liz Fraser - Flossie
- Terence Plummer - Axeman in the Tower of London

== Filming locations ==
- Dorney Court, Dorney, Buckinghamshire
- Dover Castle, Dover, Kent UK
- Haddon Hall, Bakewell, Derbyshire
- Harlaxton Manor, Harlaxton, Lincolnshire
