= Barbara Cartland =

English writer and media personality (1901–2000)

Dame Barbara Cartland DBE DStJ
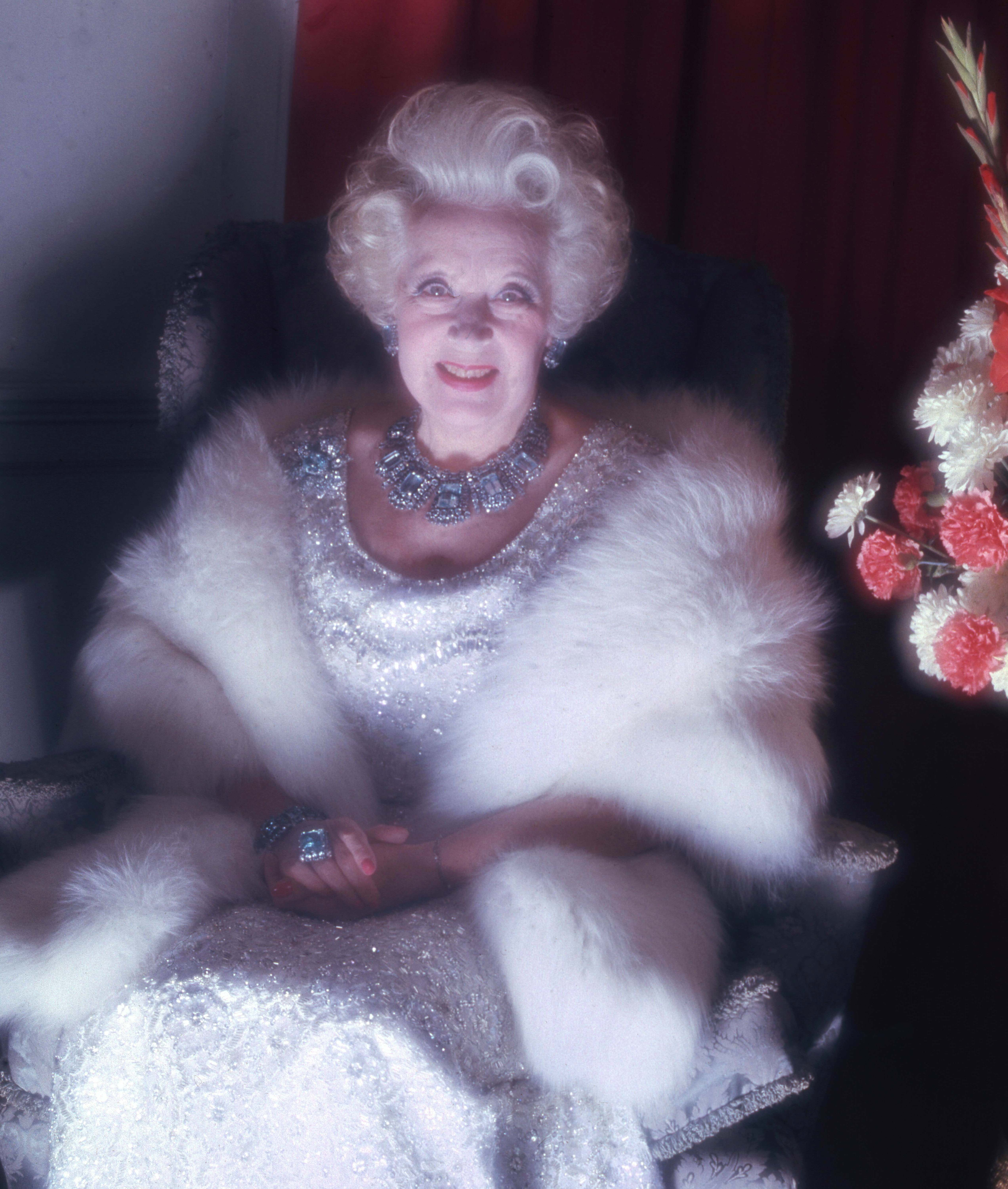
- Barbara Cartland in 1987
- Born: Mary Barbara Hamilton Cartland; 9 July 1901; Edgbaston, Birmingham, England
- Died: 21 May 2000 (aged 98); Hatfield, Hertfordshire, England
- Resting place: Hatfield, Hertfordshire, England
- Occupation: Novelist
- Spouses: Alexander McCorquodale (m. 1927; div. 1933) Hugh McCorquodale (m. 1936; died 1963)
- Children: Raine Spencer, Countess Spencer; Ian Hamilton McCorquodale (1937–2023); Glen McCorquodale (b. 1939)
- Relatives: Diana, Princess of Wales (step-granddaughter)
- Writing career
- Period: 1925–2000
- Genres: Historical Romance, contemporary romance

Dame Mary Barbara Hamilton Cartland (9 July 1901 – 21 May 2000) was an English writer and socialite who published both contemporary and historical romance novels, the latter set primarily during the Victorian or Edwardian period. Cartland is one of the best-selling authors worldwide of the 20th century.

Many of her novels have been adapted into films for television, including: The Lady and the Highwayman, A Hazard of Hearts, A Ghost in Monte Carlo and Duel of Hearts.

Her novels have been translated from English into numerous languages, making Cartland the fifth most translated author worldwide, excluding biblical works. Her prolific output totals some 723 novels.

Although best known for her romantic novels, she also wrote non-fiction titles including biographies, plays, music, verse, drama, operettas, and several health and cook books. She also contributed advice to TV audiences and newspaper magazine articles.

She sold more than 750 million copies of her books, though other sources estimate her total sales at more than two billion. The covers of her novels featured portrait-style artwork, usually designed by Francis Marshall (1901–1980).

Cartland was also head of Cartland Promotions. She was a London society figure, often dressed in a pink chiffon gown and a plumed hat and wearing blonde wig and heavy make-up.

== Biography ==
=== Early life and education ===
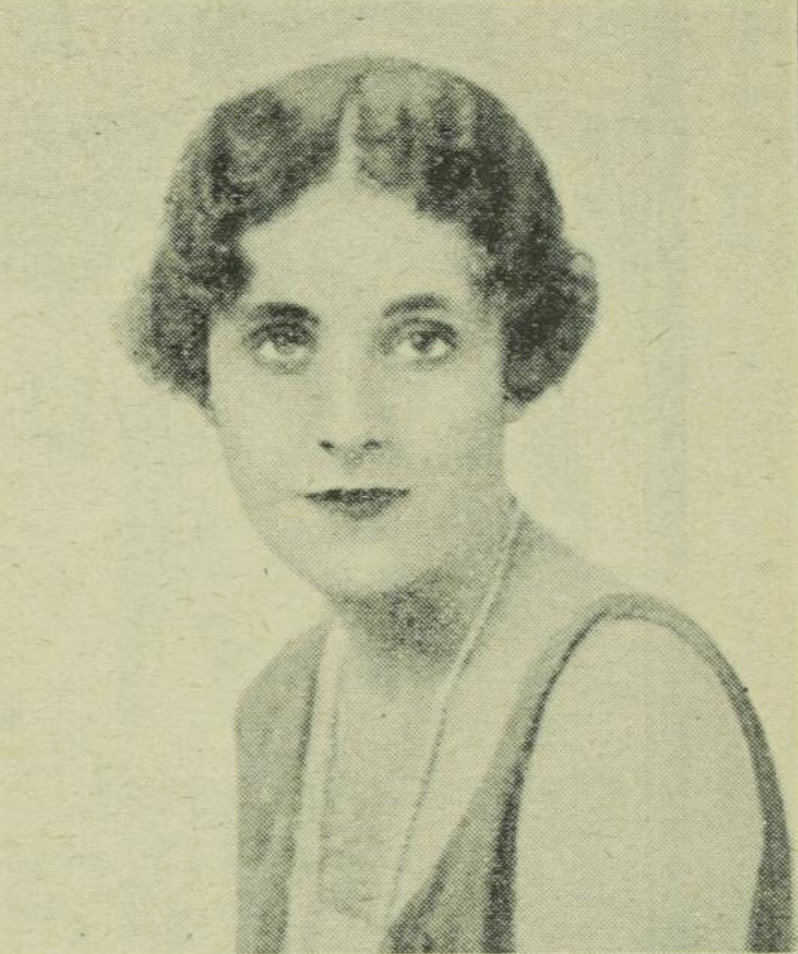
Barbara Cartland in 1925

Born at 31 Augustus Road, Edgbaston, Birmingham, Cartland was the only daughter and eldest child of an officer of the British Army, Major James Bertram "Bertie" Falkner Cartland (1876–1918), and his wife, Mary Hamilton Scobell, known as Polly (1877–1976). Cartland had two brothers: Ronald, a Member of Parliament (MP) who served as an army major in World War II (1907–1940), and James Anthony "Tony" Hamilton Cartland (1912–1940). Both were killed in action in the Battle of Dunkirk.

Though she was born into upper middle-class comfort, the Cartland family's finances rapidly deteriorated shortly after her birth. Cartland would later attribute this downturn to the suicide of her paternal grandfather, James Cartland, who, she stated, was a financier who shot himself in the wake of bankruptcy. However, according to the entry in the probate registry, James Cartland, the proprietor of the brass foundry firm James Cartland & Son Ltd, left an estate of £92,000. This was followed soon afterwards by her father's death in Berry-au-Bac in World War I. Cartland's mother opened a London grocery store to make ends meet and to raise Cartland and her two brothers.

Cartland was educated at private girls' schools: The Alice Ottley School, Malvern Girls' College, and Abbey House, an educational institution in Hampshire. She became a successful society reporter after 1922 and a writer of romantic fiction; she stated she was inspired in her early work by the novels of the Edwardian author Elinor Glyn, whom she idolised and eventually befriended.

=== Marriage and relationships ===
According to an obituary published in The Daily Telegraph, Cartland broke off her first engagement, to a Guards officer, when she learned about sexual intercourse. She claimed to have declined 49 marriage proposals before marrying Captain Alexander "Sachie" George McCorquodale, on 23 April 1927, a British Army officer from Scotland and heir to a printing fortune. They divorced in 1933 and he died from heart failure in 1964.

Their daughter, Raine McCorquodale (9 September 1929 – 21 October 2016), who Cartland later alleged was the daughter of George Sutherland-Leveson-Gower, 5th Duke of Sutherland, or Prince George, Duke of Kent, became Debutante of the Year in 1947. After the McCorquodales' divorce in 1933, which involved charges and counter charges of infidelity, Cartland married her ex-husband's cousin, Hugh McCorquodale, on 28 December 1936. Cartland and her second husband, who died in 1963, had two sons: Ian Hamilton McCorquodale (11 October 1937 – 10 February 2023), a Debrett's publisher, and Glen McCorquodale (born 1939), a stockbroker.

Cartland maintained a long friendship with Lord Mountbatten of Burma, whose death in 1979 she said was the "greatest sadness of my life". Mountbatten supported Cartland in her charitable works, particularly for United World Colleges, and even helped her write her book Love at the Helm, providing background naval and historical information. The Mountbatten Memorial Trust, established by Mountbatten's great-nephew Charles, Prince of Wales, after Mountbatten was assassinated in Ireland, was the recipient of the proceeds of this book on its release in 1980.

When Cartland learned that young Diana Spencer loved reading her novels, Cartland began to send early copies. However, as an adult, Diana, her step-granddaughter, did not invite Cartland to her wedding to Prince Charles. Cartland was later openly critical of Diana's divorce, though the rift between them was mended shortly before Diana's fatal car crash in Paris, in 1997. According to Susanna de Vries in her book Royal Marriages, Cartland once remarked, "The only books Diana ever read were mine, and they weren't awfully good for her."

== Writing career ==
=== Novels ===
After a year as a gossip columnist for the Daily Express, Cartland published her first novel, Jigsaw (1923), a risqué society thriller that became a bestseller. She also began writing and producing somewhat racy plays, one of which, Blood Money (1926), was banned by the Lord Chamberlain's Office. In the 1920s and 1930s Cartland was a prominent young hostess in London society, noted for her beauty, energetic charm and daring parties. Her fashion sense also had a part, and she was one of the first clients of designer Norman Hartnell; she remained a client until he died in 1979. He made her presentation and wedding dresses; the latter was made to her own design against Hartnell's wishes and she admitted it was a failure.

In 1950 Cartland was accused of plagiarism by author Georgette Heyer, after a reader drew attention to the apparent borrowing of Heyer's character names, character traits, dialogue and plot points in Cartland's early historical romances. In particular A Hazard of Hearts (1949) replicated characters (including names) from Heyer's Friday's Child (1944) and The Knave of Hearts (1950): Heyer alleged that "the conception ... , the principal characters, and many of the incidents, derive directly from an early book of my own, entitled These Old Shades, first published in 1926. ... For minor situations and other characters she has drawn upon four of my other novels." Heyer completed a detailed analysis of the alleged plagiarisms for her solicitors but the case never came to court.

As well as writing novels, Cartland wrote a guide to married life in the 1950s, which was banned in Ireland.

Despite their tame story lines, Cartland's later novels were highly successful. By 1983 she rated the longest entry in Who's Who (though most of that article was a list of her books), and she was named the top-selling author in the world by the Guinness Book of Records. In addition, in 1976 Cartland wrote 23 novels, earning her the Guinness World Record for the most novels written in a single year. The 1970s and 1980s were her most prolific period. She also regularly appeared on television in that era. She had firm opinions on the romance genre, stating that it was both "physical and spiritual" and stressed its emphasis on beauty rather than sexuality. One example of a novel that Cartland did not believe was part of the canon was Harriet by Jilly Cooper.

In 2000 her publishers estimated that since the beginning of her writing career in 1923 Cartland had produced a total of 723 titles.

In the mid-1990s, by which time she had sold more than a billion books, Vogue called Cartland "the true Queen of Romance".

=== Non-fiction books ===
Cartland wrote several biographies of major figures, including Metternich: The Passionate Diplomat in 1964, The Outrageous Queen: A Biography of Christina of Sweden in 1956, The Private Life of Charles II: The Women He Loved in 1958, and Josephine, Empress of France in 1961. Her biography of Klemens von Metternich focused on his many love affairs and contained passages such as: "He was a virile, experienced and satisfying lover.... Even the most sophisticated women felt as if in his arms they learnt something they had never known before. Every woman rose with him to heights of emotional ecstasy beyond the power of expression."

== Political influence ==
After the death of her brother Ronald Cartland during World War II, a Conservative Member of Parliament (MP), Cartland published a biography of him with a preface by the Prime Minister, Winston Churchill.

The war marked the beginning of a lifelong interest in civic welfare and politics for Cartland, who served the War Office in various charitable capacities as well as the St John Ambulance Brigade. In 1953 she was invested at Buckingham Palace as a Commander of the Order of St John of Jerusalem for her services.

In 1955 Cartland was elected a councillor on Hertfordshire County Council as a Conservative and served for nine years. During this time she campaigned successfully for nursing home reform, improvement in the salaries of midwives and the legalisation of education for the children of Romani.

== Music ==
A radio operetta, The Rose and the Violet, broadcast by the BBC in 1942, was composed by Mark Lubbock with book and lyrics by Cartland. It was set against the Edwardian background of Rotten Row.

Jan Kerrison, cellist, pianist and composer (and the second wife of bassoonist Archie Camden), was a neighbour and friend of Cartland. During World War II she made patriotic settings of Cartland's 'Wings on the Sunrise' and ‘The Knights of St John' for the St John's Ambulance Brigade.

Cartland recorded an EP vinyl in conjunction with the Royal Philharmonic Orchestra in 1978, titled An Album of Love Songs released through State Records, and produced by Norman Newell. The album featured Cartland performing covers of a series of popular standards including "I'll Follow My Secret Heart" and "A Nightingale Sang in Berkeley Square".

== Contribution to aviation ==
Privately, Cartland took an interest in the early gliding movement and in 1931, with two RAF officers, "designed the first aircraft-towed airmail delivery glider"; she also arranged the first long-distance (200-mile [360 km]) tow. In 1984 she was awarded the Bishop Wright Air Industry Award for this contribution.

== Honours ==
In January 1988, Cartland received the Médaille de Vermeil de la Ville de Paris, the highest honour of the city of Paris, for publishing 25 million books in France.

In 1991, Cartland was invested by Queen Elizabeth II as a Dame Commander of the Order of the British Empire (DBE) in honour of the author's almost 70 years of literary, political, and social contributions.

A waxwork of Cartland was on display at Madame Tussauds, though according to her son Ian, Cartland was displeased because it was not "pretty enough".

She was the subject of This Is Your Life on two occasions, in March 1958 when she was surprised by Eamonn Andrews at the BBC Television Theatre, and in December 1989, when Michael Aspel surprised her at Elstree Studios.

In 1996, Cartland surpassed the record for the most entries in the wider format of the biographic reference book Who's Who, with an allocated 223 lines, surpassing that of former British PM Winston Churchill.

The former residence of Cartland, River Cottage, in Great Barford, Bedfordshire, where she lived from 1941 until 1949, will be honoured with a heritage Blue Plaque which is also a monument honouring her literary career.

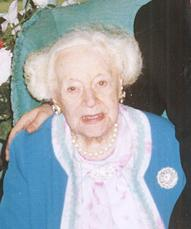
Barbara Cartland (last picture) taken at age 98

== Death and legacy ==
Cartland died in her sleep on 21 May 2000, at her residence, Camfield Place, near Hatfield, Hertfordshire at the age of 98. She had been suffering from ill health and dementia for six months beforehand, and was subsequently bedridden and sequestered. Both of her sons, Ian and Glen McCorquodale, were present at her bedside when she died. Shortly afterwards, Cartland's daughter from her first marriage, Raine, travelled to the family home.

Cartland had originally wanted to be buried in her local parish church, featuring a coffin of marble construction, covered in angels, but this was later changed; she was buried in a cardboard coffin because of her concerns for the environment. She was interred on her estate in Hatfield, Hertfordshire, under an oak that had been planted by Queen Elizabeth I. Cartland left a gross estate of £1,139,123 but following debts and liabilities the net sum was nil. She had once admitted: "I have no idea what I make....Occasionally I ask, 'Are we in debt?' We always are."

== Posthumous publications ==
Cartland left behind a series of 160 unpublished novels, known as the Barbara Cartland Pink Collection. These were published in ebook format by her son, Ian McCorquodale; each month, a new novel was published from that collection until, in 2018, all 160 novels had been published.

In 2010, to mark the 10th anniversary of her death, Cartland's first novel, Jig-Saw (first published in 1925), was reprinted.

"As a tribute to Her Majesty the Queen on her Diamond Jubilee and to Barbara's enduring appeal to romantics everywhere, her publishers have re-released her catalogue collection, entitled – "The Eternal Collection". This collection, released beginning in November 2013, includes some novels published at the time Queen Elizabeth II ascended to the throne in 1952.

In addition, her collections of ebooks are available in Spanish, Italian, German and Dutch.

In May 2026 it was announced that Bolinda, in partnership with Cartland's estate, would be publishing The Eternal Collection in audiobook format using a "bespoke AI-cloned" voice of the author.

== Feature films ==
BBC Four broadcast a biographical film entitled In Love with Barbara (26 October 2008), starring Anne Reid as Cartland and David Warner as Lord Mountbatten. The film was written by Jacquetta May.

Her last project was to be filmed and interviewed for her life story (directed by Steven Glen for Blue Melon Films). The documentary, Virgins and Heroes, includes early home ciné footage and Cartland launching her website with pink computers, in early 2000.

== Archives ==
- Some papers of Barbara Cartland are held at The Women's Library at the Library of the London School of Economics, ref 7BCA
