= Matuszczyk =

Matuszczyk is a Polish surname. Notable people with the surname include:

- Adam Matuszczyk (born 1989), Polish footballer
- Sylwia Matuszczyk (born 1992), Polish handball player

== See also ==
- Matuszczak
- Matyszczuk
