= Paula Jacobs =

British actress (1932–2021)

Paula Elsa Jacobs (1932 – 26 June 2021) was a British actress whose television and film career spanned four decades.

== Early life ==
Born in Liverpool in 1932 into a Jewish family, her father was J.P. Jacobs, whose company supplied all the elastic to Marks & Spencer.

== Career ==
Jacobs made her first television appearance in Z-Cars in 1962, going on to play roles in Softly, Softly: Task Force (1972–1975), Shoestring (1979), Hammer House of Horror (1980), Mapp & Lucia (1985), Peggy Sagar in Albion Market (1985), Mrs Biggs in Porterhouse Blue (1987), The New Statesman (1989), Bergerac (1990), Maud Wilberforce in Jeeves and Wooster (1990), Brookside (1992), French and Saunders (1993), Coronation Street (1994), Casualty (1989–1995), Drop the Dead Donkey (1994–1998), Dalziel and Pascoe (2000), Midsomer Murders (2002), Agatha Christie's Poirot (2004) and Doctors (2008).

Her film appearances include Birth of the Beatles (1979), An American Werewolf in London (1981), She'll Be Wearing Pink Pyjamas (1985), We Think the World of You (1988), Duel of Hearts (1991), The Remains of the Day (1993) and Tea with Mussolini (1999).

== Personal life ==
In 1953 she married the actor David Swift who on graduating from Cambridge worked for her father's company. She and her late husband were trustees of the J P Jacobs Charitable Trust, set up in memory of her father.

== Death ==
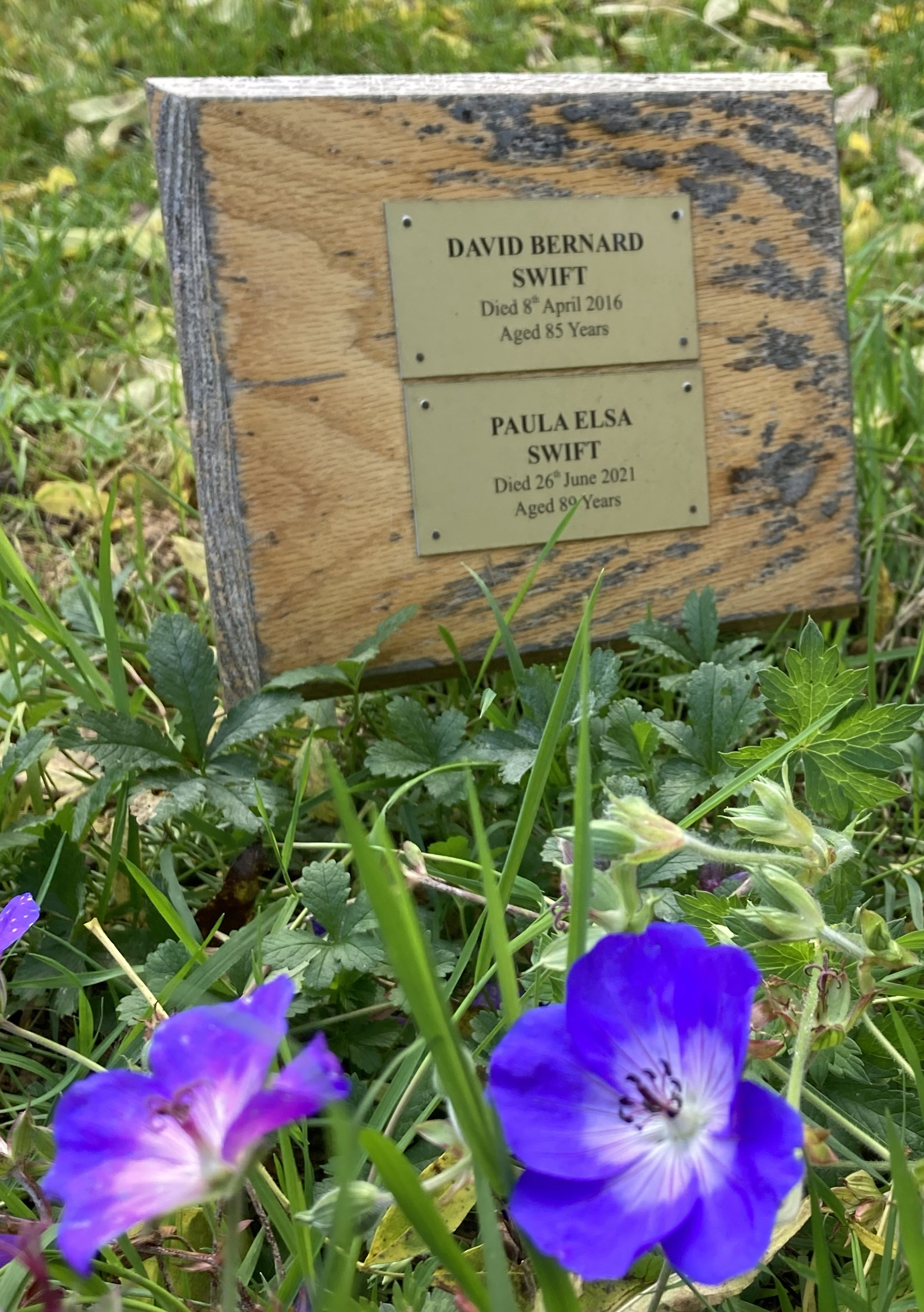
Grave of David Swift and Paula Jacobs in Highgate Cemetery

Jacobs died on 26 June 2021 and she is buried with her husband David on the eastern side of Highgate Cemetery.

== Filmography ==
Year	Title	Role	Notes
1979	Birth of the Beatles	Mrs. Flemming	
1981	An American Werewolf in London	Mrs. Kessler	
1985	The Assam Garden	Carol	
1985	She'll Be Wearing Pink Pyjamas	Doreen	
1988	We Think the World of You	Deidre	
1991	Duel of Hearts	Landlady	TV film
1993	The Remains of the Day	Mrs. Mortimer, the Cook	
1999	Tea with Mussolini	Molly	
