= The Haunted Ballroom =

Ballet by Geoffrey Toye

The Haunted Ballroom is a one-act ballet, in three scenes and an interlude, with music and libretto by Geoffrey Toye and choreography by Ninette de Valois. It was first produced in London in 1934, and was revived several times, but much of the choreography is now lost. The ballet is a Gothic melodrama about a fatal family curse.

== Production ==
The ballet was first staged by the Vic-Wells Ballet at Sadler's Wells Theatre on 3 April 1934. Geoffrey Toye, who wrote the libretto and the music, based the plot on a story by Edgar Allan Poe. The costumes and sets were by Motley. The principals in the first production were Alicia Markova as the leader of the ghosts, Robert Helpmann as the Master of Tregennis, William Chappell as the Stranger Player, and the teenaged Margot Fonteyn as the young Tregennis heir.

The work remained in the company's repertoire until 1957, but much of the choreography has since been lost.

== Plot ==
Set in a haunted ballroom, the ballet tells how the heads of the family of Treginnis are under a curse that leads to their deaths, dancing with ghostly partners.

Three guests at a ball in another part of the Tregennis house persuade the heir of Treginnis to show them the haunted ballroom. Fascinated, they want to dance, but are stopped by the master of the house. They leave and he is left alone, realising that the ghosts will come for him. Shapes appear, led by a thinly cloaked figure. Three of the ghosts resemble the young women who had strayed into the room. Treginnis seeks to dance with them, but Death intervenes. and the ballet closes with Tregennis's young son realising that he too will meet the same death.

== Sources ==
- Sorley Walker, Kathrine (1998). "Robert Helpmann, Dancer and Choreographer: Part One". Dance Chronicle. 21 (1): 1–72. doi:10.1080/01472529808569296. JSTOR 1567998. (subscription required)
