= Geoffrey Toye =

English conductor, composer and opera producer (1889–1942)

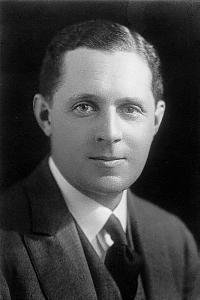

Edward Geoffrey Toye (17 February 1889 – 11 June 1942), known as Geoffrey Toye, was an English conductor, composer and opera producer. He is best remembered as a musical director of the D'Oyly Carte Opera Company and for his association with Sadler's Wells Theatre. One of his ballets, The Haunted Ballroom (1934), became popular and was revived several times, and the new overture that he prepared for Gilbert and Sullivan's Ruddigore in 1919 became the standard version.

He began his career as the piano accompaniest Luisa Tetrazzini. By 1906 he conducted performances of André Messager's opera Mirette. His early compositions included incidental music for a play and ballet music. By 1913 Toye was conducting in major London theatres. In 1914, he conducted premières of Ralph Vaughan Williams's London Symphony and George Butterworth's A Shropshire Lad. After Army service he was engaged as assistant conductor of the Beecham Opera Company and also conducted concerts for the Royal Philharmonic Society in 1918 and 1919. He served as musical director for three London seasons of the D'Oyly Carte Opera Company, earning warm notices. In 1925 and again in 1927 the BBC broadcast The Red Pen, an operatic piece with words by A. P. Herbert and music by Toye.

Toye was made a governor of the Old Vic and then Sadler's Wells Theatre, in 1931, where, as co-director with Lilian Baylis, he managed the opera and ballet until 1934. For the Sadler's Wells Ballet company, he composed two ballets, including The Haunted Ballroom, in which Margot Fonteyn had her first principal role; Ninette de Valois choreographed. It was revived several times and remained popular for many years as an orchestral piece. From 1934 to 1936, Toye became Managing Director of the Royal Opera House, Covent Garden. In 1938, he adapted, produced and conducted The Mikado for film and composed and arranged the music for two other British films in 1936: Men Are Not Gods and Rembrandt. In 1940, Toye joined the staff of the BBC. His lungs were damaged during the Blitz, and he died at the age of 53.

== Life and career ==
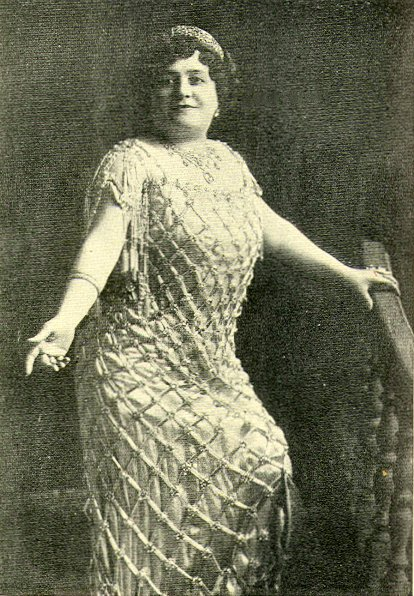
Early in his career, Toye accompanied the celebrated Luisa Tetrazzini on the piano.

Born in Winchester, Hampshire, Toye was the younger son of Arlingham James Toye and his wife Alice Fayrer née Coates. Toye's father was a housemaster at Winchester College, who for many years ran a music society for the boys. His elder brother Francis Toye was also a composer and musician.

=== Early years ===
Toye studied at the Royal College of Music, concentrating on composition and conducting. He also displayed such skill as a pianist that he was engaged "when little more than a boy" to accompany the celebrated soprano Luisa Tetrazzini. As early as 1906 he deputised for André Messager as conductor at performances of Messager's opera Mirette at Cambridge. Together with his brother Francis he composed incidental music for The Well in the Wood, a "pastoral masque" by C. M. A. Peake; and was sole creator of the scenario and music for a short ballet, The Fairy Cap, first given at His Majesty's Theatre in 1911, revived for charity performance the following year.

By 1913 Toye was conducting in major London theatres – for Maurice Maeterlinck's Blue Bird at the Haymarket Theatre, Marie Brema's opera season at the Savoy Theatre, and for the première of Bernard Shaw's Androcles and the Lion. In 1914, he was entrusted by Ralph Vaughan Williams with conducting the première of his London Symphony at the Queen's Hall. When the manuscript was lost (having been sent to Fritz Busch in Germany just before the outbreak of the First World War) Toye, together with George Butterworth and the critic Edward J. Dent, helped Vaughan Williams reconstruct the work. Also in 1914, Toye introduced Butterworth's rhapsodies A Shropshire Lad and The Banks of Green Willow to London audiences. The night before the première of The Planets, Toye dined with its composer, Gustav Holst, and the conductor Adrian Boult. Boult later recalled that Toye took exception to one bar in "Neptune", where the brass play chords of E minor and G♯ minor together: "I'm sorry, Gustav, but I can't help thinking that's going to sound frightful." Holst agreed, and said it had made him shudder when he wrote it down, but he insisted that it must be that way: "What are you to do when they come like that?"

Souvenir programme cover for the D'Oyly Carte 1919–20 season, conducted by Toye

Toye joined the Army in 1914, first as a private in the Duke of Cornwall's Light Infantry, and later in the Royal Flying Corps, in which he served in France as a photographic specialist. He retired with the rank of major. For a time after the war he was a member of the insurers Lloyd's of London, where he organised many amateur musical activities and founded the Lloyd's Choir. He was engaged as assistant conductor of the Beecham Opera Company and also conducted concerts for the Royal Philharmonic Society in 1918 and 1919.

Rupert D'Oyly Carte, a fellow Wykehamist, appointed Toye as musical director for three D'Oyly Carte Opera Company seasons at the Prince's Theatre in London: 1919–20, 1921–22, and 1924. In his first season there, Toye revised the score of Gilbert and Sullivan's Ruddigore, cutting some music and writing a new and more dramatic overture that did not use themes from numbers that Toye had cut. Thereafter, Toye's overture was always used by the D'Oyly Carte Opera Company, even when the cut numbers were restored in the 1970s, and it became the standard performance version. He also arranged a new overture for The Pirates of Penzance, but that did not remain in use, and no copy of the score is known to have survived. As D'Oyly Carte's musical director, Toye impressed the critics; The Musical Times wrote, "Mr. Geoffrey Toye is doing his work as conductor conspicuously well. He has made many of us realise afresh how beautifully the operas are scored. He has never-failing vivacity and the right sense of musical humour." In 1925 and again in 1927 the BBC broadcast The Red Pen, "a sort of opera", with words by A. P. Herbert and music by Toye. In 1927 Toye was joint musical director of a benefit performance for the old D'Oyly Carte leading man, Courtice Pounds, in which Toye was joined by stars from many branches of theatre, including Seymour Hicks, Evelyn Laye, Walter Passmore, Gertrude Lawrence and Derek Oldham.

=== Later years ===
Scene from the 1921 production of Ruddigore, for which Toye had composed a new overture

Toye, who had already been made a governor of the Old Vic, became a governor of Sadler's Wells Theatre in 1931, where, as co-director with Lilian Baylis, he managed the opera and ballet until 1934. For the Sadler's Wells Ballet company, he composed two ballets to his own scenarios: Douanes, in October 1932, a comedy set in a customs post described by The Times as "delightful and amusing", and, in 1934, The Haunted Ballroom, which portrays the Masters of Treginnis who are cursed to dance themselves to death in a gloomy ancestral ballroom by the ghosts of the women whom they had loved. As in Ruddigore, the curse is passed to the heir of the accursed. The piece makes "imaginative... use of an eerie... chorus commentary". The Haunted Ballroom was Margot Fonteyn's first principal role and also starred Robert Helpmann. Ninette de Valois choreographed both works and revived The Haunted Ballroom several times after Toye's death. Its last performance in Sadler's Wells's repertoire was on BBC television on 24 February 1957. The original choreography of the piece now survives only in fragments. The Waltz from the score is probably Toye's best-known composition and has been recorded several times. It remained popular for many years as an orchestral piece.

From 1934 to 1936, Toye became Managing Director of the Royal Opera House, Covent Garden, working alongside the Artistic Director, Sir Thomas Beecham. Despite early successes, Toye and Beecham eventually fell out over Toye's insistence on bringing in a popular film star, Grace Moore, to sing Mimi in La bohème. The production was a box-office success, but an artistic failure. Beecham manoeuvred Toye out of the managing directorship in what Sir Adrian Boult described as an 'absolutely beastly' manner.

Toye obtained the film rights to the Gilbert and Sullivan operas. In 1938, he adapted, produced and conducted The Mikado, starring Martyn Green, Sydney Granville and the American singers Kenny Baker and Jean Colin, but the onset of war prevented further screen adaptations. Toye composed and arranged the music for two other British films of the 1930s: Men Are Not Gods and Rembrandt, both for Alexander Korda in 1936.

In 1940, Toye joined the staff of the BBC, in the American Liaison and Censorship Department. He was twice married, first in 1915 to the actress Doris Lytton, and later to Dorothy Fleitman, with whom he had one son, John, who was an actor and then a long-time news anchor for Scottish Television; he took his own life in 1992. Toye's elder brother, Francis, was a well-known critic and Verdi scholar. Their sister Eleanor's daughter became a principal soprano with D'Oyly Carte under the name Jennifer Toye.

Toye died in 1942 in London at the age of 53, a victim of the Blitz, during which a blast damaged his lungs.

== Compositions and recordings ==
In addition to his ballets, Toye's compositions included several books of songs (including some sea chanties), a symphony, a masque, Day and Night, a radio opera: The Red Pen (1925, with A. P. Herbert), an opera: The Fairy Cup, and two short choral items: Henrichye's Death, with orchestra, and The Keeper, with brass accompaniment.

Toye made very few gramophone records. For HMV, in 1928, he conducted the London Symphony Orchestra in recordings of Delius's Brigg Fair, On Hearing the First Cuckoo in Spring, and In a Summer Garden. The composer wrote, "All three... are excellent and I shall be glad to have them sold as authorised by me." Toye also recorded The Walk to the Paradise Garden in 1929.

Toye's overture to Ruddigore has been recorded numerous times, conducted by Harry Norris, Isidore Godfrey, and Sir Malcolm Sargent (who each recorded the complete opera) and Sir Charles Mackerras, among others. Norris, Godfrey and Sargent all observe some or all of Toye's cuts and other minor alterations in the score. Toye's only recording conducting a Gilbert and Sullivan work is the 1938 film of The Mikado referred to above. Of Toye's original music, the waltz from The Haunted Ballroom has been recorded several times, including one in the 1990s by the Marco Polo record label. A complete recording of the ballet was made in 2001 by the Royal Ballet Sinfonia.
