= Kenny Baker (American performer) =

Singer and actor (1912–1985)

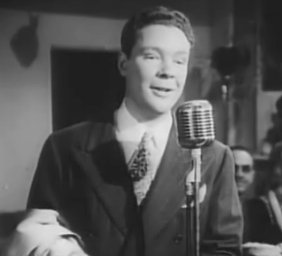
- in the trailer for Stage Door Canteen (1943)
- Born: Kenneth Laurence Baker; September 30, 1912; Monrovia, California, U.S.
- Died: August 10, 1985 (aged 72); Solvang, California, U.S.
- Occupations: Actor, singer
- Years active: 1933–1951
- Spouse(s): Geraldyne Louise Churchill (1933-1968) (divorced, 3 children)
- Children: 3

Kenneth Laurence Baker (September 30, 1912 – August 10, 1985) was an American singer and actor who first gained notice as the featured singer on radio's The Jack Benny Program during the 1930s.

== Film ==
Before he became a star, Baker sang as a member of the Vitaphone chorus at Warner Bros.

At the height of his radio fame, and after leaving the Benny show in 1939 (succeeded by Dennis Day, whose tenor voice was very similar to Baker's), he appeared in 17 film musicals, including Mr. Dodd Takes the Air (1937), At the Circus (1939), and The Harvey Girls (1946). He also starred in the 1939 movie version of Gilbert and Sullivan's The Mikado. He later co-starred with Mary Martin in the original Broadway production of Kurt Weill and Ogden Nash's One Touch of Venus (1943).

== Radio ==
Baker first appeared on Jack Benny's weekly radio program on November 3, 1935, having been hired to replace singer Frank Parker. Parker had been very popular on the Benny program, and with his departure, it was widely believed that Benny would lose a large part of his audience; however, Kenny Baker is said to have won audiences over almost instantly, even surpassing Parker in popularity. Baker portrayed a high-voiced, innocent young man on the show, who would frequently cause the Jack Benny character frustration with his "silly" remarks.

Baker's final regular appearance on Benny's radio show aired on June 25, 1939, leaving the $3,000 per week job because he no longer wanted to play the character. He was subsequently replaced by singer Dennis Day. After his four-year stint on the Benny program, Baker returned to radio as a regular performer on Fred Allen's Texaco Star Theater program (1940–1942). He was also heard on Blue Ribbon Town (1943–1944) and Glamour Manor (1945–1947). He had his own programs, the Kenny Baker Show (1954) and Sincerely – Kenny Baker (1946). The latter was syndicated by the Frederick W. Ziv Company via electrical transcription.

== Later years ==
After retiring from performing in the early 1950s, Baker became a Christian Science practitioner and motivational speaker and recorded a number of record albums of hymns for his church.

== Death ==
Baker died of a heart attack in Solvang, California, August 10, 1985, aged 72.

== Partial filmography ==
- King of Burlesque (1936)
- Mr. Dodd Takes the Air (1937)
- The King and the Chorus Girl (1937)
- Turn Off the Moon (1937)
- 52nd Street (1937)
- The Goldwyn Follies (1938)
- At the Circus (1939) as Jeff Wilson
- The Mikado (1939)
- Hit Parade of 1941 (1940)
- Doughboys in Ireland (1943)
- Stage Door Canteen (1943)
- The Harvey Girls (1946)
- Calendar Girl (1947)
