= Bernadetta Matuszczak =

Polish composer (1937–2021)

Bernadetta Matuszczak (10 March 1937 – 3 September 2021) was a Polish composer. She was born in Toruń, Poland, and studied with Zygmunt Sitowski for music theory and with Irena Kurpisz-Stefanowa for piano at the State Higher School of Music in Poznań. Later she studied with Tadeusz Szeligowski and Kazimierz Sikorski for composition at the State Higher School of Music in Warsaw (now the F. Chopin Academy of Music). She continued her education in composition with Nadia Boulanger in Paris in 1968. After completing her studies, she worked as a composer. Her works have been performed internationally.

== Honors and awards ==
- Prize from the Young Polish Composers' Competition, Association of Polish Composers (1965)
- Prizes from the Grzegorz Fitelberg Competition for Composers (1966)
- Jeunesses Musicales Competition (1967)
- Prix Italia for radio opera-oratoria (1973, 1979)

== Works ==
Selected works include:

- Septem Tubae, 1969
- Juliet and Romeo, chamber opera, 1972
- Diary of a Fool, opera monodrama, 1976
- Musica da camera per 3 flauti, 4 timpani e 5 tom-toms (1967)
- Humanae voces, (1970–71)
- Apocalypsis according to St. John, (1976–77)
- Ballet Miniatures for orchestra (1985)
- Notturno - Karol Szymanowski in memoriam in tres partes per cello solo (1987)
- Canticum polonum per archi (1987)
- By Night at the Old Town, pantomime based on Isaac Leib Peretz for solo voices, choir and symphony orchestra (1988)
