= The Red Pen =

The Red Pen is a two-act operetta and early radio opera composed by Geoffrey Toye to a libretto by A. P. Herbert. The piece, described by its creators as "a sort of opera" was written for the BBC, following Herbert's successful Riverside Nights, and had a running time of about 90 minutes. It was first broadcast on the radio on 24 March 1925. It was broadcast again in 1927.

== Roles ==
Role	Voice type	Premiere Cast, 24 March 1925 (Conductor: I. Stanton Jefferies )
Sir Robert Quint, a cabinet minister		Bertram Ayrton
The Hon. Michael Gray, a private secretary		Edward Lear
Henry Wordsworth, a general secretary		Stuart Robertson
Samuel Slate, a pressman, and Captain Danby, a military officer		John Buckley
Mary Jane Blake, assistant private secretary		Gladys Palmer
Mary Palmer, leader of the Consumers' Deputation		Geoffrey Stanton
Daffodil Smith, assistant general secretary		Vivienne Chatterton

The performers for the second broadcast were Gladys Palmer, Vivienne Chatterton, John Buckley, Harold Kimberley, John Tanner, and Sydney Granville. The composer conducted the Wireless Orchestra.

== Synopsis ==
The first act is set in Hyde Park and the second in the Ministry of Verse at St. James's Park. The story is set "in the near future" (the late 1920s), and opens with the whimsical premise that the "General Federation of Poets and Writers", a trade-union for authors, is agitating for the nationalisation of their industry. "The Red Pen", from which the play takes its title, is their march, a play on The Red Flag. In Act II, set six months later, the newly established Ministry of Verse is run in a comically bureaucratic civil service style.
