= Wolfgang Kasack =

German scholar and translator

Wolfgang Kasack (Russian: Вольфганг Германович Казак, Volfgang Germanovich Kazak; Potsdam, 20 January 1927 – Much, 10 January 2003) was a German Slavic studies scholar and translator.

After his death, his academic estate was donated to the University of Mainz.

He was son of the German writer Hermann Kasack.

== Honors ==
- 1981 Johann-Heinrich-Voß-Preis für Übersetzung
- 1997 Aleksandr Men Prize

== Selected works ==
- Lexikon der russischen Literatur ab 1917, Stuttgart, Kröner, 1976
- Science-fiction in Osteuropa: Beiträge zur russischen, polnischen und tschechischen phantastischen Literatur, 1984
- Russische Weihnachten: ein literarisches Lesebuch, Freiburg im Breisgau; Basel; Wien, Herder, 2000 ISBN 3-451-05075-7
- Christus in der russischen Literatur: ein Gang durch ihre Geschichte von den Anfängen bis zum Ende des 20. Jahrhunderts, Stuttgart, Verl. Urachhaus, 2000 ISBN 3-8251-7250-3
- Der Tod in der russischen Literatur: Aufsätze und Materialien aus dem Nachlass (Hg. Frank Göbler), München, Sagner, 2005 ISBN 3-87690-907-4
