= Hans Vogt (composer) =

German composer and conductor

- Born: 14 May 1911; Danzig
- Died: 19 May 1992 (aged 81); Metterich
- Education: Akademie der Künste
- Occupations: Composer; Academic teacher
- Organization: Musikhochschule in Mannheim-Heidelberg
- Works: Die Stadt hinter dem Strom

Hans Vogt (14 May 1911 – 19 May 1992) was a German composer and conductor.

== Career ==
Born in Danzig, Vogt studied with Georg Schumann and Otto Frickhoeffer at the Akademie der Künste in Berlin from 1929 to 1934. From 1934 he worked in Minden as a cellist, pianist and conductor. In 1935 he was appointed Kapellmeister at the Bielefeld Opera and in 1937 at the Landestheater Detmold. That same year he joined the Nazi Party (registration no. 5.653.178). From 1938 until 1944 he was Kapellmeister of the Stralsunder Theater, and then music director of Stralsund, where he was also chairman of the Ministry of Arts. In 1944 he was drafted into the military and sent to the Russian front. He was taken prisoner of war in 1945 and did not return from the Soviet Union until 1949.

In the postwar period Vogt lived first in 1949 as a freelance composer in Neckargemünd. From 1951 to 1978 he led a composition class at the Musikhochschule in Mannheim-Heidelberg. In 1971 he was appointed professor. Among his students was Barbara Heller.

Vogt composed two operas, Die Stadt hinter dem Strom after the novel of Hermann Kasack and Athenerkomödie (The Metropolitans) on a libretto by Christopher Middleton after a fragment of Menander. Vogt wrote a symphony, two concertos for orchestra, two piano concertos, a violin concerto, a cello concerto, Serenade und Tarantella for viola and chamber ensemble, chamber music and Lieder. His sacred music included a Requiem, two chamber oratorios, a cantata, a Magnificat, and other choral music. In particular he composed the Psalm 129, De profundis clamavi ad te, Domine, for a seven-part mixed choir a cappella (1951), a Passion music Ihr Töchter von Jerusalem, weinet nicht über mich in Latin and German for tenor, mixed choir and percussion (1973), and a Canticum Simeonis for mixed choir and flute (1976).

Vogt's first opera, Die Stadt hinter dem Strom, was originally written for radio and premiered on Nordwestdeutscher Rundfunk and BBC Radio in 1952. Vogt later adapted the work for the stage, and as a live theatre piece the opera was first performed at the Hessisches Staatstheater Wiesbaden in 1955 as part of the Internationale Maifestspiele Wiesbaden. For his operas, Vogt collaborated with the librettists, Hermann Kasack (Die Stadt hinter dem Strom) and Christopher Middleton (The Metropolitans). Erich Fried, together with the composer, translated Middleton's English libretto into German. In an obituary for the publisher and musicologist Fritz Oeser that Vogt authored, the composer recalled how, during rehearsals for Die Stadt hinter dem Strom, Oeser had requested him to come to Wiesbaden to change the choral prologue, also that Oeser missed a climax in a certain scene in act 3 and promised to pay for a change. Kasack's libretto was published by Suhrkamp in 1955. Vogt's opera Athenerkomödie (The Metropolitans) was premiered at the Mannheim National Theatre in 1964, he revised it in 1967.

Vogt composed secular vocal works inspired by poems of Hermann Kasack, Christopher Fry, W. H. Auden, T. S. Eliot, Gerard M. Hopkins, Aesop's Fables, poems of Christopher Middleton, Gertrud Kolmar, Horace, Eduard Mörike and Gottfried Benn. Vogt's chamber music without keyboard includes a trio for flute, viola and harp (1951, revised 1989), a string trio, four string quartets, a string quintet, a string sextet, a string octet, duos for violin and double bass, violin and cello, violin and viola, cello and double bass, and music for solo instruments. With keyboard, he composed works for piano solo, piano four hands, two pianos, a quintet for flute, oboe, violin, bassoon and harpsichord (1958), Konzertante Sonate für 17 Soloinstrumente, a sonata concertante for 17 solo instruments (1959), Dialoge für Klavier, Violine und Violoncello (dialogues for piano trio, 1960), and works with piano for solo instruments cello, violin and oboe.

Vogt's music was published by Breitkopf & Härtel, Bärenreiter, and Bote & Bock. He also published books, Neue Musik seit 1945 (New Music since 1945), ISBN 3-15-010203-0, and Johann Sebastian Bachs Kammermusik: Voraussetzungen, Analysen, Einzelwerke (Johann Sebastian Bach's chamber Music: background, analysis, works), Stuttgart 1981, ISBN 3-15-010298-7. The latter was translated to English and published in Portland, Oregon, in 1988, ISBN 0-931340-04-7, and to Spanish, published in Barcelona in 1993, ISBN 84-335-7880-4.

Vogt died in Metterich in 1992 at the age of 81.

== Selected works ==
=== Opera ===
- Die Stadt hinter dem Strom, Oratorische Oper (oratorio opera) in 3 acts, text by Hermann Kasack after his novel, Bärenreiter/Alkor, 1952 radio version, revised stage version 1955
- Athenerkomödie (The Metropolitans), Opera giocosa in one act, text after a fragment of Menander by Christopher Middleton, in German by Erich Fried and Hans Vogt, Bärenreiter/Alkor, 1962, revised version 1987

=== Orchestra ===
- Konzert für mehrchöriges Orchester, concerto for orchestra in several choirs, Bärenreiter/Alkor, 1950
- Konzert für Klavier und Orchester, piano concerto, Bärenreiter/Alkor, 1955
- Konzert für Orchester, Bärenreiter/Alkor, 1960
- Strophen (Stanzas), orchestral and vocal on an ode of Horace, its composition by Petrus Tritonius (1507) and its German poetry by Eduard Mörike for baritone and orchestra, Bärenreiter/Alkor, 1975
- Konzert für Violine und Orchester, violin concerto, Bote & Bock, 1981
- Konzert für Violoncello und Orchester, cello concerto, Bote & Bock, 1981
- Dona nobis pacem, symphony in one movement, Bote & Bock, 1984
- Apreslude, music for large orchestra, mezzo-soprano ad lib, in three movements after a poem of Gottfried Benn, Bote & Bock, 1988

=== Sacred music ===
- De profundis clamavi ad te, Domine, Psalm 129 für gemischten Chor a capella, Bärenreiter, 1951
- Historie der Verkündung, chamber oratorio for three female voices, mixed choir and 13 instruments, Bärenreiter, 1955
- Ihr Töchter von Jerusalem, weinet nicht über mich, Passion music for tenor, mixed choir and percussion, Bärenreiter, 1963
- Magnificat for soprano, mixed choir and orchestra, Bärenreiter/Alkor, 1966
- Requiem for soprano and bass, mixed choir and percussion, Breitkopf & Härtel, 1969
- Canticum Simeonis for mixed choir and flute, Bärenreiter, 1976
- Historie vom Propheten Jona, chamber oratorio, after the Old Testament and texts of Hilde Domin for alto, tenor and 6 instruments, Bärenreiter, 1979
- Drei geistliche Gesänge after Baroque poetry for baritone and organ, Bärenreiter, 1981/83

== Sources ==
- Fred K. Prieberg: Handbuch Deutsche Musiker 1933–1945, CD-Rom-Lexikon, Kiel 2004, p. 7.389–7.390
- Ernst Klee: Das Kulturlexikon zum Dritten Reich. Wer war was vor und nach 1945. S. Fischer, Frankfurt am Main 2007, p. 632
