= Duel of Hearts =

- Genre: Romantic drama
- Based on: A Duel of Hearts by Barbara Cartland
- Screenplay by: Terence Feely
- Directed by: John Hough
- Starring: Alison Doody; Michael York; Geraldine Chaplin; Benedict Taylor
- Theme music composer: Laurie Johnson
- Country of origin: United Kingdom
- Original language: English

Production
- Producers: Lew Grade; John Hough; Laurie Johnson
- Cinematography: Terry Cole
- Editor: Peter Weatherley
- Running time: 95 min
- Production company: Gainsborough Pictures

Original release
- Network: TNT (US)
- Release: 24 February 1992

Duel of Hearts is a 1991 romantic television film directed by John Hough. Terence Feely penned the screenplay, based on the 1949 Barbara Cartland novel, A Duel of Hearts. The film stars Alison Doody, Michael York, Geraldine Chaplin and Benedict Taylor.

== Plot ==
Lady Caroline Faye and Lord Vane Brecon meet under unusual circumstances and are immediately attracted to one another. Later, Lady Caroline learns that Lord Brecon has been accused of murder. She embarks on a plan to prove him innocent, while also warning him that his cousin, Gervaise Warlingham, may be trying to frame him. Posing as a commoner, she accepts a position at Lord Brecon's estate as companion to his mother. Will dangerous family secrets keep the lovers apart?

== Cast ==
- Alison Doody - Lady Caroline Faye
- Benedict Taylor - Lord Vane Brecon
- Michael York - Gervaise Warlingham
- Geraldine Chaplin - Mrs. Miller
- Billie Whitelaw - Dorcas
- Virginia McKenna - Lady Brecon
- Suzanna Hamilton - Harriet Wantage
- Jeremy Kemp - Lord Milborne
- Richard Johnson ... Lord Belgrave
- Beryl Reid ... Lady Augusta Warlingham
- Jolyon Baker ... Lord Stratton
- Adalberto Maria Merli ... Grimaldi
- Margaret Mazzantini ... Zara
- John Albasiny ... Gideon
- Tom Adams ... Magistrate
- Paula Jacobs ... Landlady
