= Hermann Kasack =

German writer (1896–1966)

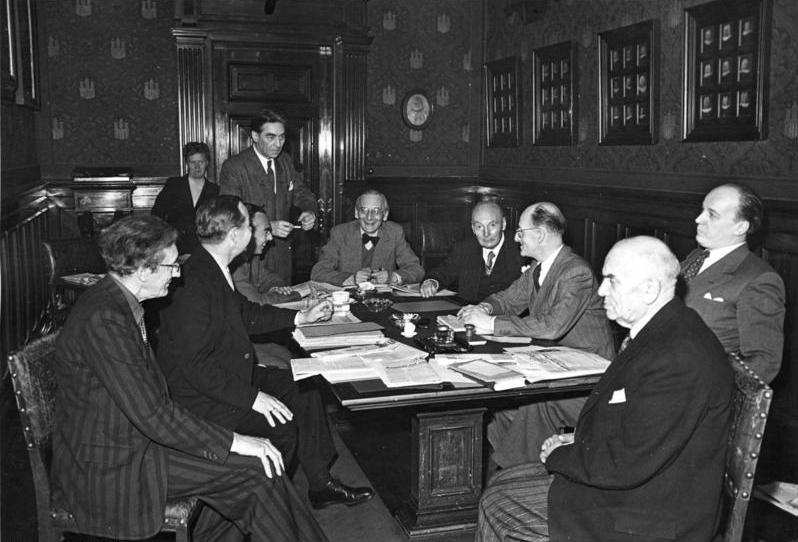
- Kasack, at the head of the table, PEN-Zentrum 1949
- Born: Hermann Robert Richard Eugen Kasack; 24 July 1896; Potsdam
- Died: 10 January 1966 (aged 69); Stuttgart
- Education: Humboldt-Universität zu Berlin
- Occupations: Writer; Literary editor; Academic teacher
- Organization: S. Fischer Verlag
- Works: Die Stadt hinter dem Strom

Hermann Robert Richard Eugen Kasack (24 July 1896 – 10 January 1966) was a German writer. He is best known for his novel Die Stadt hinter dem Strom (The city beyond the river). Kasack was a pioneer of using the medium broadcast for literature. He published radio plays also under the pen names Hermann Wilhelm and Hermann Merten.

== Career ==
Kasack was born in Potsdam as the only child of a doctor, he studied from 1914 to 1920 national economics and history of literature at the Humboldt-Universität zu Berlin.

In 1915, he published his first poem in the magazine Die Aktion. Two years later, a lifelong friendship began with both the painter Walter Gramatté, the model for the painter Catell in Die Stadt hinter dem Strom, and the poet Oskar Loerke. In 1918, he released a volume of poems, entitled Der Mensch. Verse, which was his first published book.

He started working as a literary editor in 1920 in the publishing house Gustav-Kiepenheuer-Verlag in Potsdam, where he edited the complete works of Friedrich Hölderlin. From 1925, he worked for the Funk-Stunde Berlin. His drama Die Schwester was premiered in 1926. He was director at the S. Fischer Verlag until 1927. On 28 March 1933, he was prohibited from working for any broadcast.

In 1941, he succeeded Oskar Loerke as literary editor in the S. Fischer Verlag, and took consequently over the direction of the publishing house when Peter Suhrkamp was arrested from 1944.

His most famous novel, Die Stadt hinter dem Strom (The city beyond the river) appeared in 1947, for which he was awarded the Fontane Prize of the city of Berlin two years later. A 1957 review stated:

But it took the extraordinary event of 1947, the publication of his first novel, Die Stadt hinter dem Strom, to catapult his name into the literary limelight and lift it to true prominence.

In 1948, Kasack was a founding member of the German PEN center. He was from 1953 to 1963 the president of the Deutsche Akademie für Sprache und Dichtung. He wrote a libretto for an opera Die Stadt hinter dem Strom, which was composed by Hans Vogt and premiered at the Hessisches Staatstheater Wiesbaden in 1955 as part of the Internationale Maifestspiele Wiesbaden. In 1956, he was awarded the Goethe-Plakette des Landes Hessen.

Kasack died on 10 January 1966 in his home in Stuttgart.

His son Wolfgang Kasack (1927–2003) was a German Slavist.

== Selected works ==
=== Drama ===
- Die Schwester. Eine Tragödie in acht Stationen (The Sister. A Tragedy in Eight Stations), Berlin 1920
- Die tragische Sendung. Ein dramatisches Ereignis in zehn Szenen (The Tragic Mission. A Dramatic Event in Ten Scenes), Berlin 1920 (Potsdam 1993)
- Vincent, play in 5 acts, Potsdam 1924
- Die Stadt hinter dem Strom, libretto of an "Oratorische Oper" in 3 acts, Frankfurt am Main 1954

=== Radio plays ===
- Stimmen im Kampf, Berlin 1930, first broadcast 7 December 1930 (30 min)
- Tull, der Meisterspringer, Berlin 1932, 10 radio plays for children, extant: Kinderreise mit Tull (34 min) and Tull's Kinderolympiade (27 min)
- Eine Stimme von Tausend, Berlin 1932, first broadcast 6 October 1932 (12 min)
- Der Ruf, Berlin 1932, first broadcast 12 December 1932 (58 min)

=== Novels ===
- Die Stadt hinter dem Strom, Berlin 1947
- Das große Netz, Berlin/Frankfurt am Main 1952

== Literature ==
- Pierre Lech: Hermann Kasack und der zeitkritische Roman der Gegenwart. Echternach/Luxemburg 1956 (Univ., Diss., 1956)
- Wolfgang Kasack (editor): Leben und Werk von Hermann Kasack. Ein Brevier. Suhrkamp 1966.
- Heribert Besch: Dichtung zwischen Vision und Wirklichkeit. Eine Analyse des Werkes von Hermann Kasack mit Tagebuchedition (1930–1943). Röhrig, St. Ingbert 1992, ISBN 3-924555-96-6
- Tufarulo, G.M.- Il mondo è vero, il mondo è falso, parola di Hermann Kasack !- Pensiero e Arte, 2004
