= Rotten Row =

Road and bridleway in Hyde Park, London

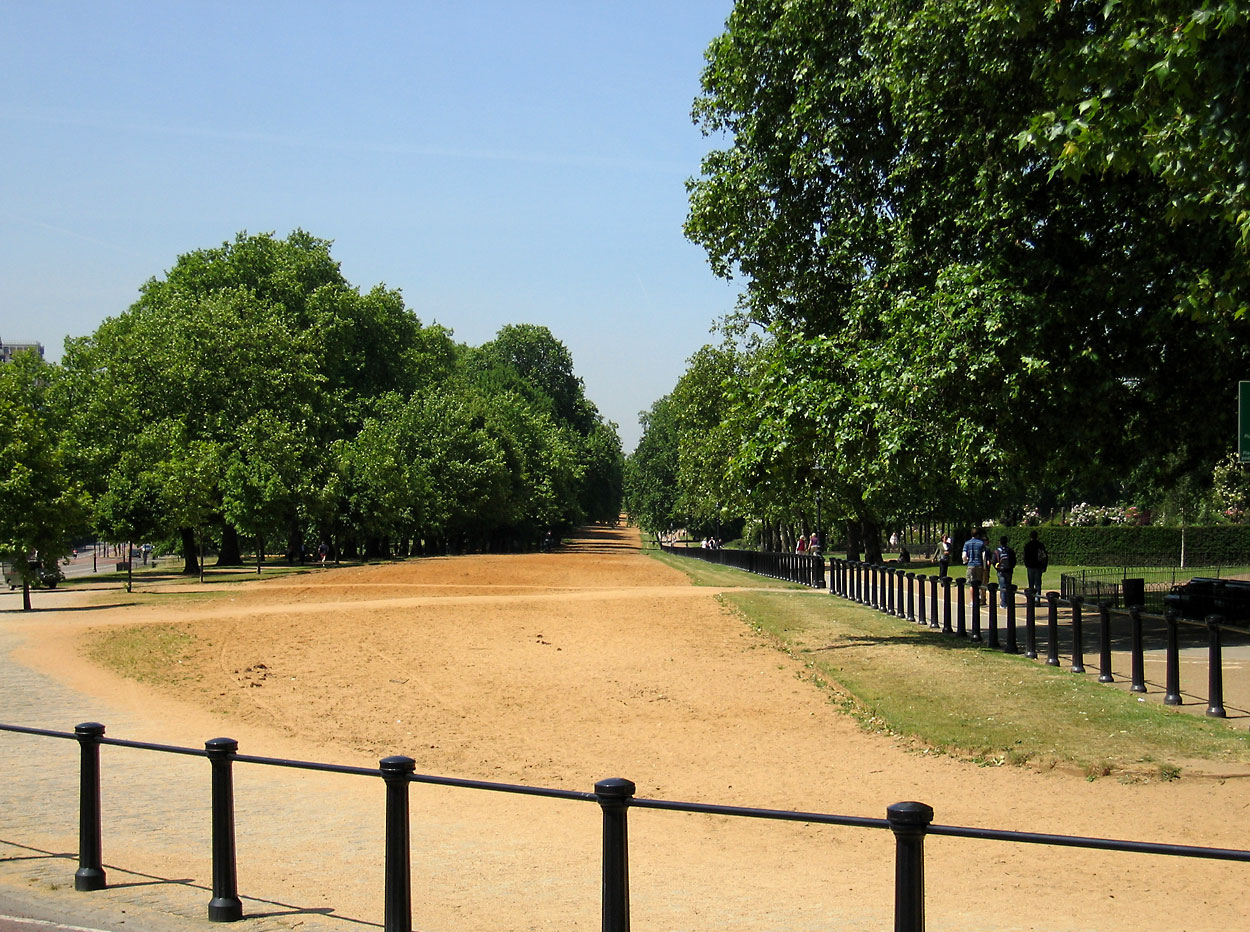
- Rotten Row, looking west from Hyde Park Corner, June 2005

- Location within City of Westminster
- Former name: Route du Roi
- Length: 1,384 m (4,541 ft)
- Location: Hyde Park, London, United Kingdom
- Postal code: W2
- Nearest Tube station: Hyde Park Corner
- Coordinates: 51°30′13.25″N 0°9′59″W
- East end: Hyde Park Corner
- West end: Serpentine Road

Construction
- Completion: 1690

Other
- Known for: Equestrianism

Rotten Row is a broad track running 1,384 metres (4,541 ft) along the south side of Hyde Park in London. It leads from Hyde Park Corner to Serpentine Road. During the 18th and 19th centuries, Rotten Row was a fashionable place for upper-class Londoners to be seen horse riding. Today it is maintained as a place to ride horses in the centre of London, but it is little used as such.

== History ==
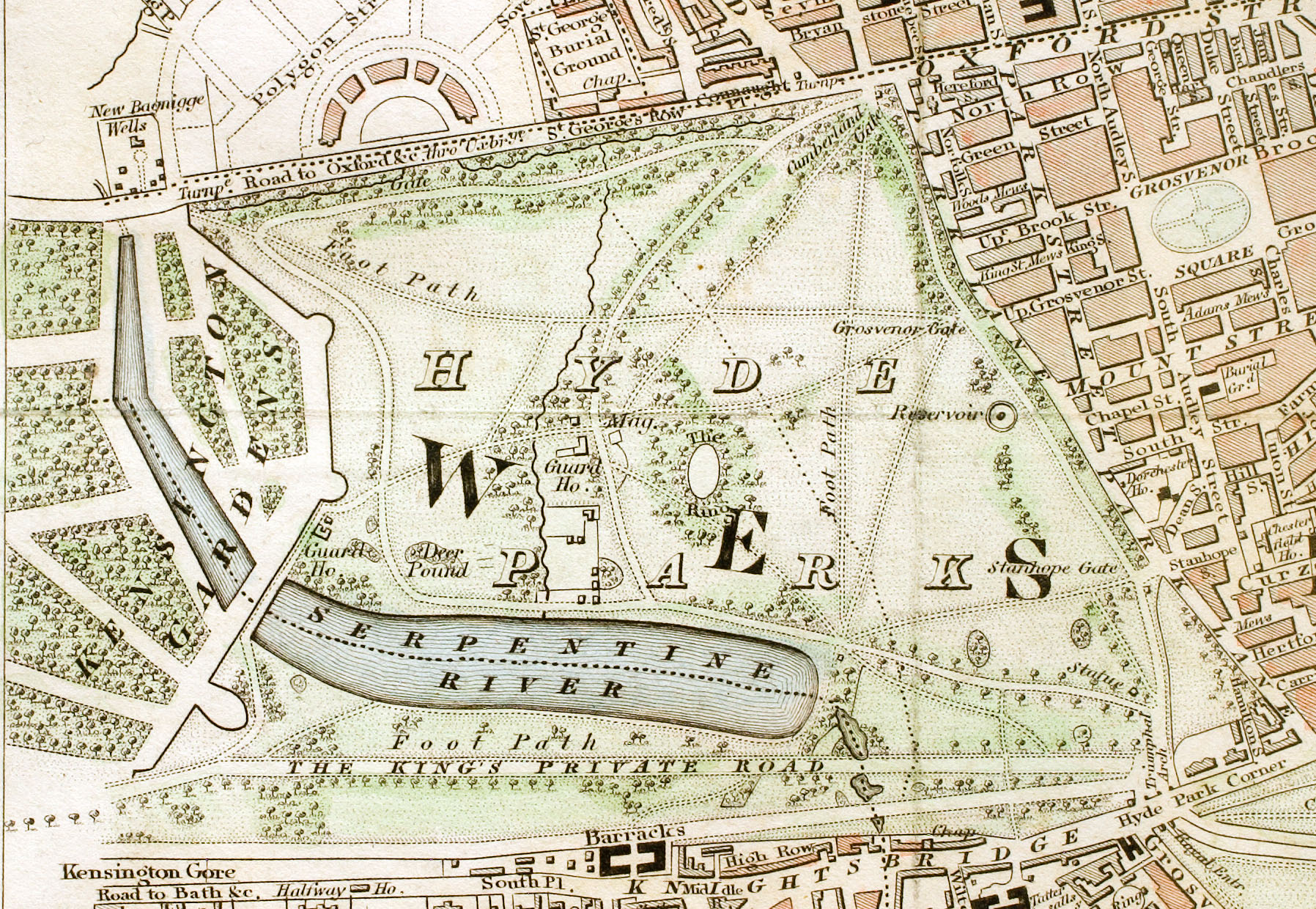
An 1833 map of Hyde Park. Rotten Row is marked as The King's Private Road

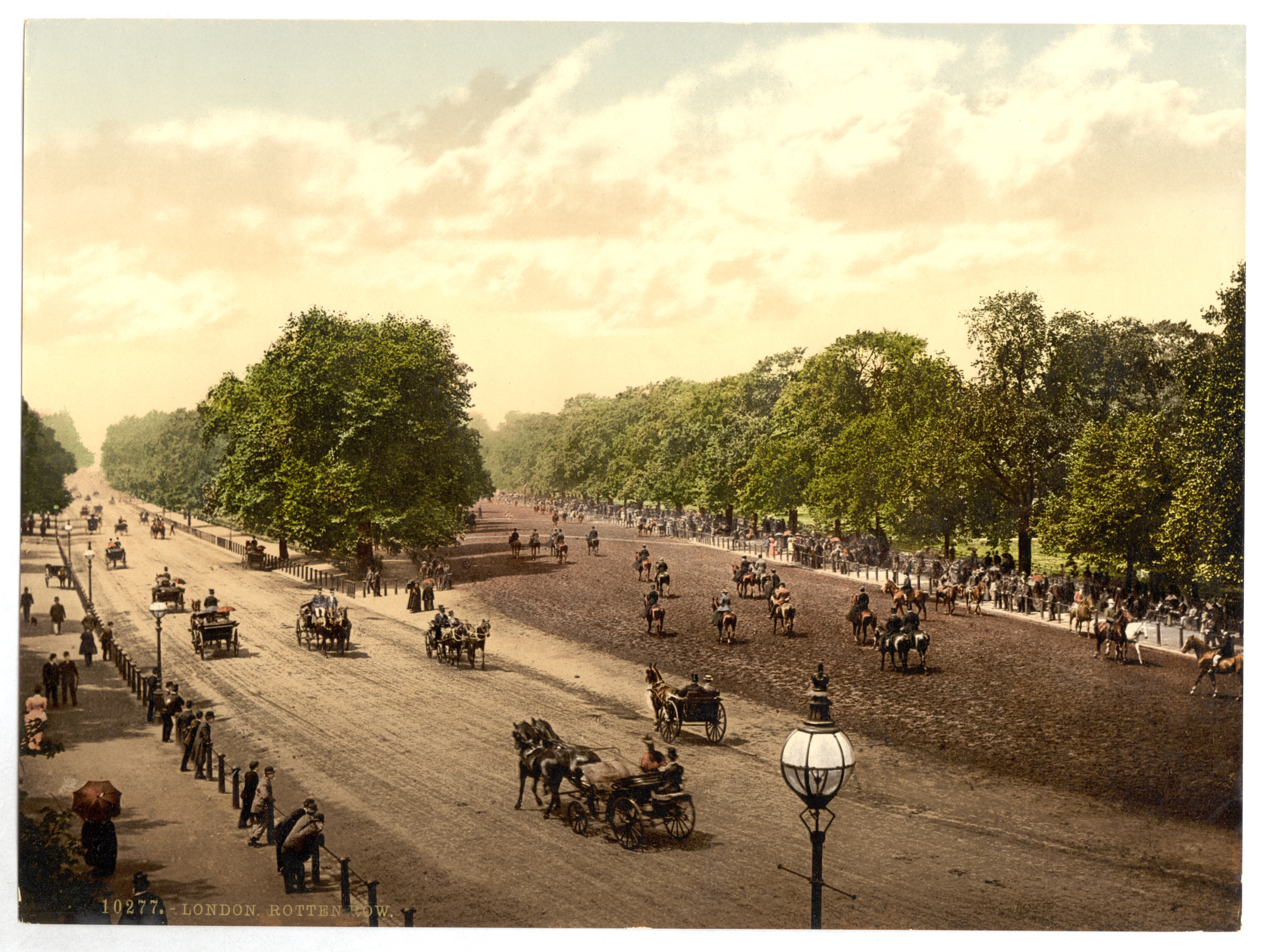
Rotten Row and the South Carriage Drive c.1890-1900, photomechanical print

Rotten Row was established by William III at the end of the 17th century. Having moved the court to Kensington Palace, William wanted a safer way to travel to St. James's Palace. He created the broad avenue through Hyde Park, lit with 300 oil lamps in 1690—the first artificially lit highway in Britain. The lighting was a precaution against highwaymen, who lurked in Hyde Park at the time. The track was called Route du Roi, French for King's Road, which was eventually corrupted into "Rotten Row".

In the 18th century, Rotten Row became a popular meeting place for upper-class Londoners. Particularly on weekend evenings and at midday, people dressed in their finest clothes to ride along the row and be seen. The adjacent South Carriage Drive was used by society people in carriages for the same purpose. In 1876, it was reconstructed as a horse-ride, with a brick base covered by sand.

The sand-covered avenue of Rotten Row is maintained as a bridleway and forms part of Hyde Park's South Ride. It is convenient for the Household Cavalry, stabled nearby at Hyde Park Barracks in Knightsbridge, to exercise their horses. Members of the public may also ride, although few people have stables close enough to make use of it. Commercial stables nearby, the Hyde Park Stables and 'Ross Nye Stables, offer horse hire and riding lessons to the public.

A Royal plaque commemorating 300 years of Rotten Row was erected in 1990.

"ROTTEN ROW - The King's Old Road, Completed 1690 This ride originally formed part of King William III's carriage drive from Whitehall to Kensington Palace. Its construction was supervised by the Surveyor of their Majesties' Roads, Captain Michael Studholme and it was the first lamp-lit road in the Kingdom. Designated as a public bridleway in the 1730s, Rotten Row is one of the most famous urban riding grounds in the world."

== Cultural references ==
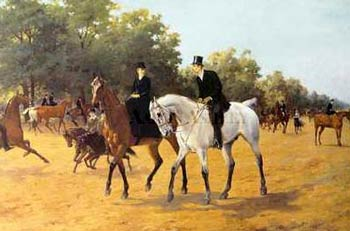
A view of Rotten Row, painted by Thomas Blinks, circa 1900

Rotten Row features in a short piece of orchestral light music, composed by Wally Stott in 1958. It is briefly alluded to as "that wretched row" in the 1891 Oscar Wilde short story ″The Sphinx Without a Secret″.

Michael Crichton's 1975 novel and the subsequent feature film The First Great Train Robbery, set in 1854/5, has a scene in which the character Edward Pierce (portrayed by Sean Connery) escorts Emily Trent (Pamela Salem) on a supposedly romantic ride along Rotten Row.

In Bram Stoker's 1897 gothic horror novel Dracula, Jonathan and Mina Harker briefly visit "the Row" after solicitor Peter Hawkins' funeral and interment, "...but there were very few people there, and it was sad-looking and desolate to see so many empty chairs. It made us think of the empty chair at home..." (Sept 22). After this, they go to Piccadilly, where Jonathan is astonished to see Dracula in England for the first time.

In Patrick Hamilton’s novel “The Plains of Cement” (1934), the ageing Mr Eccles takes the barmaid Ella for a walk in Hyde Park, “alongside Rotten Row”.

In To Let by John Galsworthy, the third book of The Forsyte Saga, Soames Forsyte, walking from Knightsbridge to Mayfair in 1920, stops to contemplate "the Row" and the social decline exhibited there over sixty years of his experience.

In the Netflix series Bridgerton, season two, episode three, Jack Featherington suggests “Rotten Row, perhaps?” as a place to promenade with a lady he intends to spend time with. Again, in season three, episode two, Penelope Featherington states to her mother she is going to “Rotten Row to get a little fresh air”. In season four, episode two, Benedict Bridgerton attempts to find his mystery lady along the Row.

The locale also served as backdrop for events in many of Georgette Heyer's Regency romance novels.

== Other locations ==
"Rotten Row" is a location in at least 15 places in England, Scotland, South Africa and Zimbabwe, such as in Lewes, East Sussex and Elie, Fife. It describes a place where there was once a row of tumbledown cottages infested with rats (raton) and dates to the 14th century or earlier, predating the London derivation. Other historians have speculated the name might be a corruption of rotteran (to muster), Ratten Row (roundabout way), or rotten (the soft material with which the road is covered). There is Rotten Row Magistrates Court in Zimbabwe which is located on Rotten Row Road in the capital of the Southern African nation. The road connects to Prince Edward Street in the Avenues and Charter and Cripps Roads in the south of the Magistrates Court. The only other Rotten Row is a road in the South African town of Winburg near Bloemfontein.

== See also ==
- Ladies Mile, Clifton, a similar social promenade in Bristol
