= Radio opera =

Opera genre

Radio opera (German: Funkoper or Radiooper) is a genre of opera. It refers to operas which were specifically composed to be performed on the radio and is not to be confused with broadcasts of operas which were originally written for the stage. Radio operas were generally shorter than staged operas and some occupied less than fifteen minutes. Plots were usually more straightforward than those of stage operas.

== History ==
The earliest radio operas were broadcast in the 1920s and followed earlier broadcasts of plays with incidental music. The first radio opera seems to have been The Red Pen, composed by Geoffrey Toye to a libretto by A. P. Herbert. It was originally aired by the British Broadcasting Corporation on 24 March 1925. Germany followed with Gustav Kneip's Christmas opera for children, Christkinds Erdenreise (Christ-Child's Journey on Earth), 24 December 1929, and Walter Goehr's Malpopita in May 1931.

The Willow Tree (1932) by composer Charles Wakefield Cadman and librettist Nelle Richmond Eberhart was the first American opera specifically written for the radio, although Cesare Sodero's Ombre Russe was the first American opera to be given its premiere on radio in 1929.

The 1930s proved to be the high-point of radio opera, with at least twelve productions composed by German, American, Czech, Swiss and French composers. The genre declined after World War II, perhaps with the advent of television, although composers such as Luigi Dallapiccola, Ildebrando Pizzetti, Nino Rota, Hans Werner Henze, Bernd Alois Zimmermann, Bruno Maderna and Karl Aage Rasmussen continued to compose for the radio, as do 21st-century composers such as the Estonian Jüri Reinvere, Amy Kohn in America and Robert Saxton in Britain.

== See also ==
- List of radio operas
- List of television operas
