= Gustav Kneip =

German composer and conductor

Gustav Kneip (3 April 1905 - 24 October 1992) was a German composer and conductor. He is best known for composing music to several radio dramas in Germany from 1927-1951. He also wrote some popular songs as well and composed the music to four films: Das Hermännchen. Nee, nee, was es nich' alles gibt (1936), Insel ohne Moral (1950), I'm Waiting for You (1952), and Der Glücksbringer (1957).

Born in Beningen, Kneip was trained at the Staatliche Hochschule für Musik Köln where he was a pupil of Hermann Unger. In 1924 he became a conductor at Theater Bonn where he remained for many years. In 1927 he began working as a sound engineer and radio composer for Westdeutscher Rundfunk. He continued to work as sound engineer and composer at the WR and for Saarländischer Rundfunk as well up into the early 1950s.

In 1951 Kneip relocated to Hamburg where he remained for the rest of his life. He continued to work as a freelance composer in his later years. He died in Hamburg in 1992 at the age of 87.
