= Boulestin =

Boulestin can refer to:

- Marcel Boulestin (1877–1943), French restaurateur and television chef
- Boulestin, a restaurant owned by Joel Kissin
