= Caledon Museum =

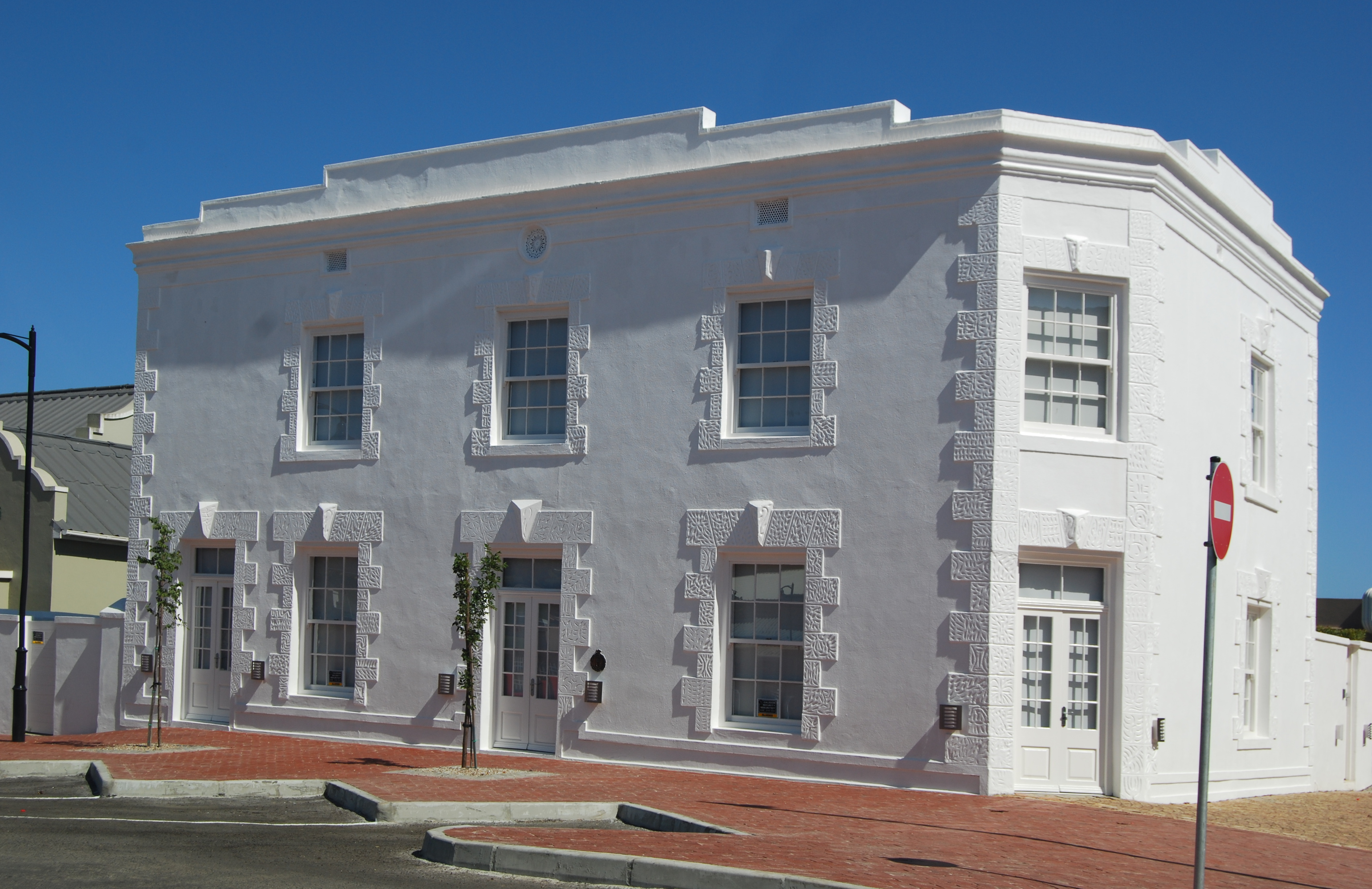
- Georgian Cottage in Caledon, Western Cape
- Established: 5 May 1970
- Location: Constitution Street, Caledon, Western Cape (Overberg District Municipality), South Africa
- Coordinates: 34.229768°S 19.429829°E
- Type: Social History Museum
- Owner: Board of Trustees

Caledon Museum, in the town of Caledon, Western Cape, South Africa, is a social history museum displaying and collecting around the themes The Victorian Period in Caledon and The History of People Living in Caledon. It receives financial support from the province of Western Cape.

== History ==
=== Establishment ===
Local interest in the creation of a museum for the town resulted in the founding of the “Caledon Museumvereniging” (Caledon Museum Association) on 5 May 1970. Committees were formed for fund raising and item collecting, and a constitution was adopted.

The management committee of the Association consulted with Dr Mary Cook, at that time the curator of the Drostdy Museum in Swellendam. She advised that they concentrate their collecting efforts on the Victorian era, as no other museum in the area was focused on that period, and it coincided with a time of growth and development in the Caledon region. The Museum Association was successful in getting their fledgling museum proclaimed a provincial museum, according to Museum Ordinance 31 of 1968, on 25 July 1972.

=== 11 Krige Street ===
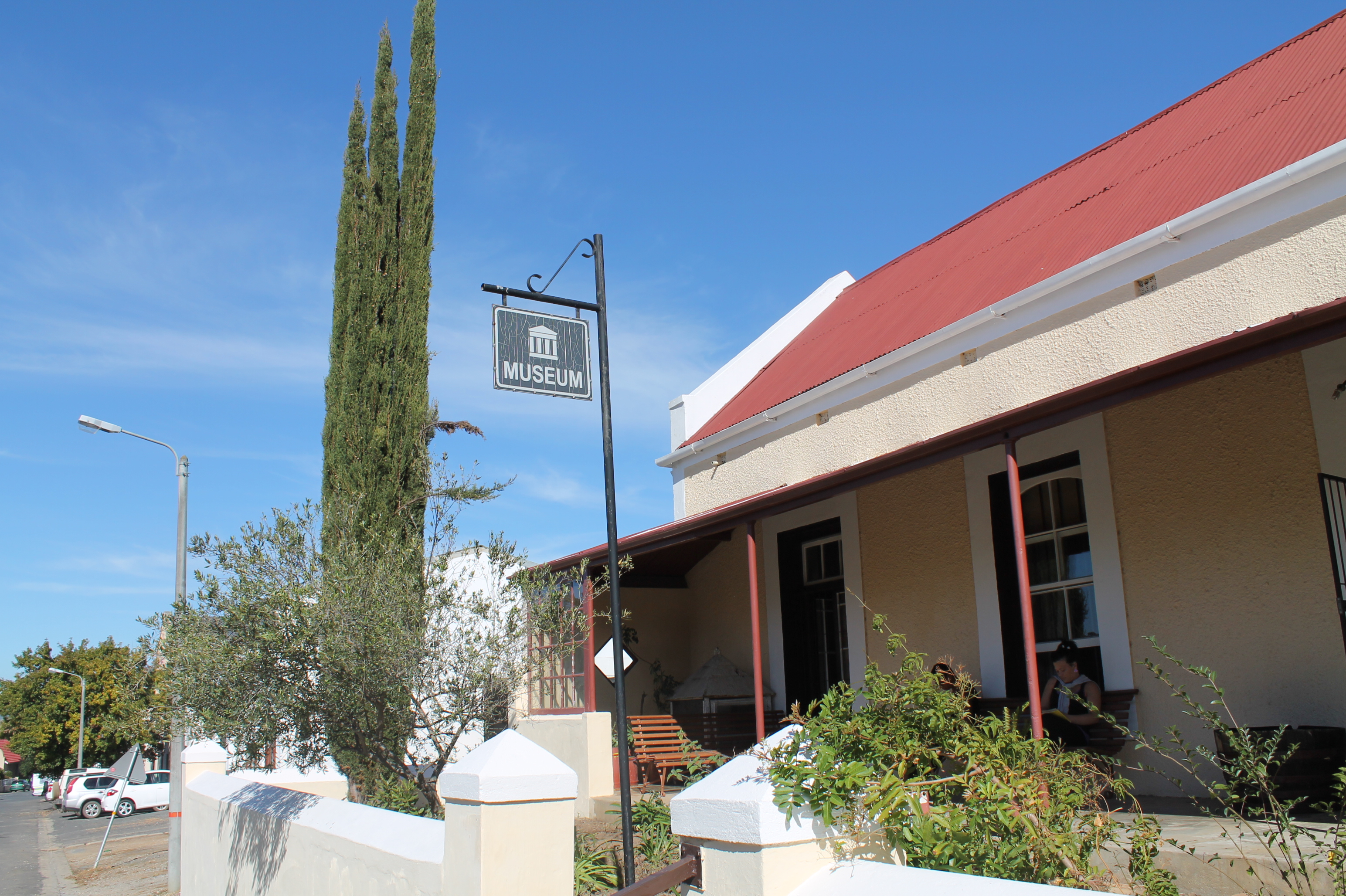
The House,11 Constitution Street

The house at 11 Krige Street, was built by Rev. Theunissen, when he did not want to live in the rectory that was provided for him. The building later became a maternity home, and was used as such until the new hospital was completed with a maternity wing in 1970. The building was then sold by the Provincial Administration to the Caledon Museum Association, to house the new museum. (Letter from the Caledon Museum Association to the Director, Department of Nature Conservation, Cape Town; 29 October 1971; Translated from the Afrikaans). The museum displayed its collection, which had been so enthusiastically assembled by the museum committee, in this building until the early 1990s when the museum relocated closer to the historic centre of town.

=== 11 Constitution Street ===
The residential house at 11 Constitution Street, was purchased by the museum in 1991 and was restored by the curator Tizzie Mangiagalli to be used as a house museum.

The then director of museums, Mr Brian Wilmot opened the museum on Friday 2 December 1994. The house depicts the late Victorian period 1870-1900. In restoring the house all the inside woodwork, windows, ceilings and doors were wood grained, some of the floors had to be replaced, and the walls of all the rooms except the kitchen, pantry and the exhibition room were wallpapered. The wallpapers were researched typical of that time, samples of wallpapers were found in a house in Mill Street.

From old photographs and plans, research was done on other old buildings of the same era in Caledon. Information in the interior was resourced from the books of the writer Dr Con de Villiers and the descriptions of his family home on the farm Dunghye Park in the Caledon district. The Caledon family of Hoffman and the De Kock family (who lived in the house) were also helpful with information. During restoration an underground stream had to be piped and diverted away from the house. The kitchen, back passage and pantry were restored and a woodstove was installed in the kitchen. Local builders were used in the restoration of the house and Johan Burger of Museum Services at Ruyterwacht restored all the furniture.

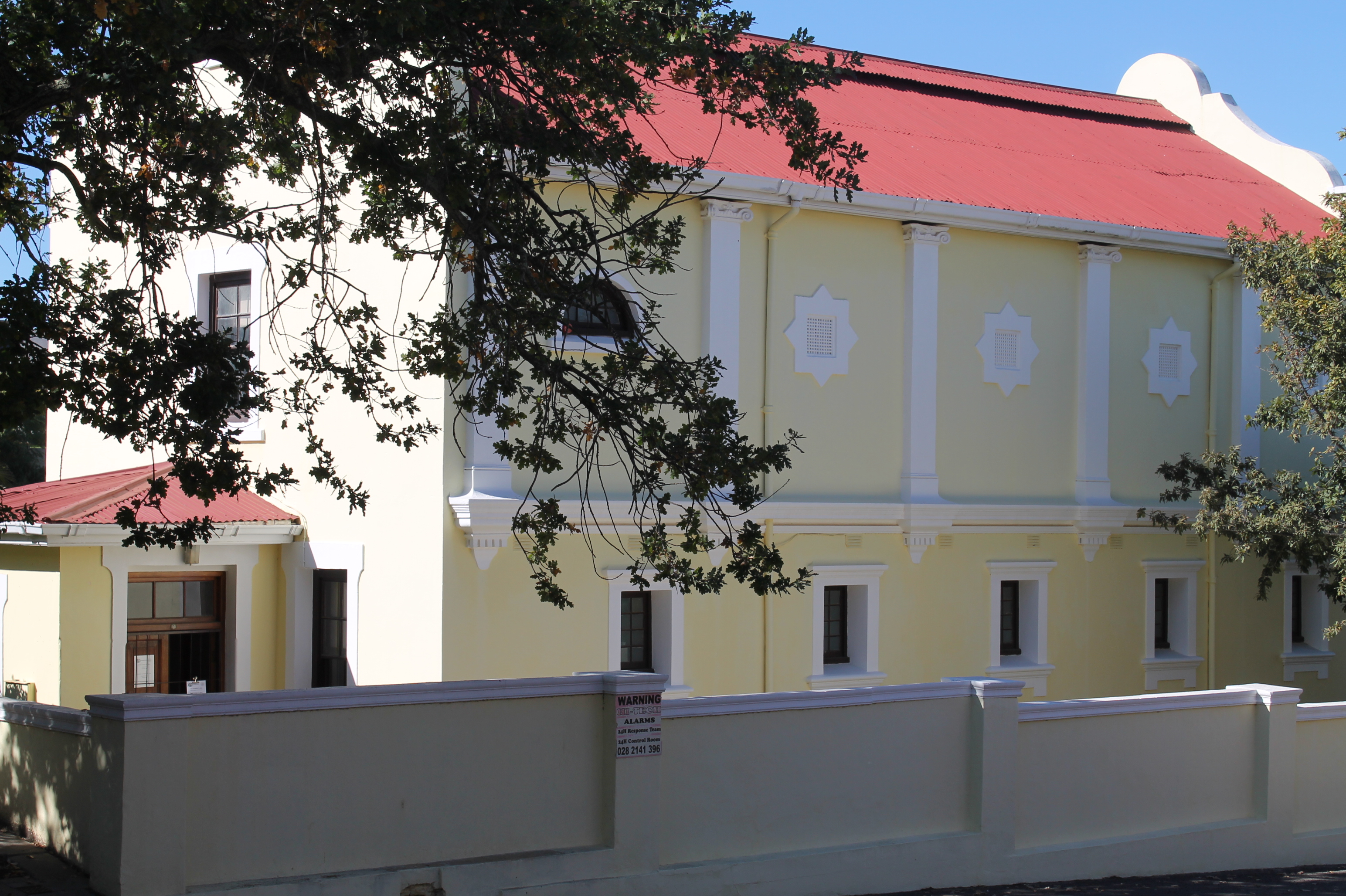
The Old Masonic Lodge, 16 Constitution Street

== Current Sites ==
In 1996 the museum took over management of the Caledon Town Hall. This impressive building, located in Plein Street, was completed in 1906 and is a Provincial Heritage Site. The museum ran a very successful shop, and used part of the building to display the Caledon Family Photographs which it was in the process of collecting. In 2007 the municipality took back management of the hall, and the museum was entirely located in its premises in Constitution Street.

=== The Town Hall and the Old Masonic Lodge ===
At the same time that, the Constitution Street house was purchased, the museum also purchased the Masonic Lodge at 16 Constitution Street. The Lodge, which had been vacant for a time, was renovated to serve as store rooms and offices for the museum. The Lodge is also used to display various items of furniture and currently houses the Caledon Family Photographs. The museum has no ties whatsoever to the Freemasons, but the decorative ceiling, original to the Lodge can still be viewed.

== Collections ==
=== Caledon Family Photos ===
In 1992 the board of trustees of the museum took a decision to make the museum more inclusive, and launched the “Caledon Museum Genealogy Project”. In depth research was launched on the families of Caledon and their role in the community. Old photographs were traced and copied and then documented enabling the museum to trace the development of the community and also changes it experienced such as the Group Areas Act of 1950.

=== The Victorian Period in Caledon ===
The house at 11 Krige Street depicts the Victorian Period in Caledon, in the form of a house museum. The rooms are decorated with period furniture, house-hold objects and ornaments. A bedroom, sitting room, study, dining room and kitchen are on display. The objects on display have been donated to the museum or purchased for display purposes.

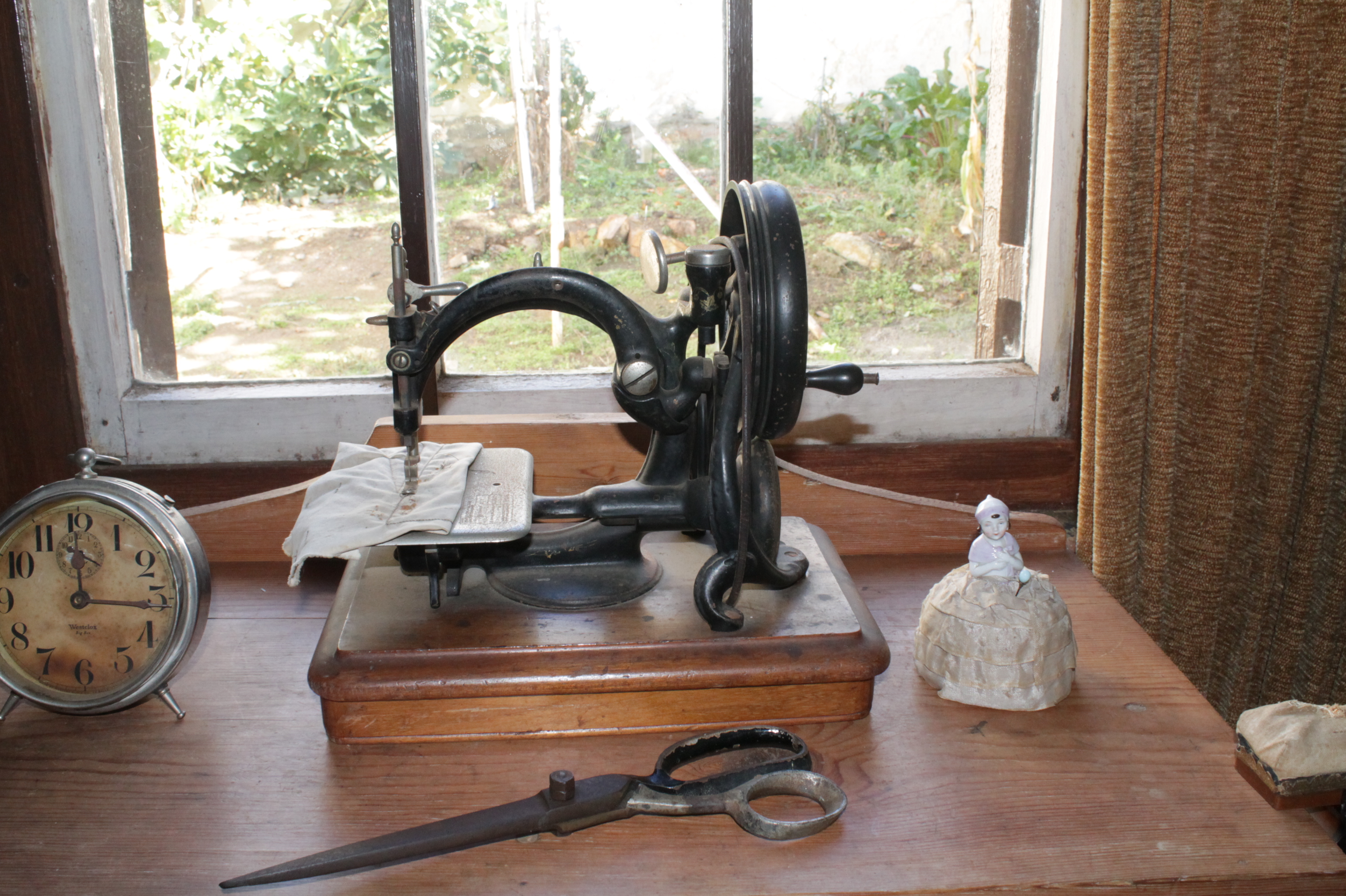
Detail of the dining room, at the House, Caledon Museum.

=== The Peter Clarke Collection ===
The renowned South African artist Peter Clarke lived in Tesselaarsdal, near Caledon, for a period when he was a young man. The Caledon Museum has a collection of his work from this time. The works depict Tesselaarsdal people and places; they are mainly pencil drawings, with some watercolour and other mediums used. The works are relatively small, and some are studies showing the artist developing his technique. Seen together the collection shows Tesselaarsdal and the people who live there viewed with a loving eye. The works are recognisably Peter Clarke’s, while also displaying the youthful naiveté of a young artist.

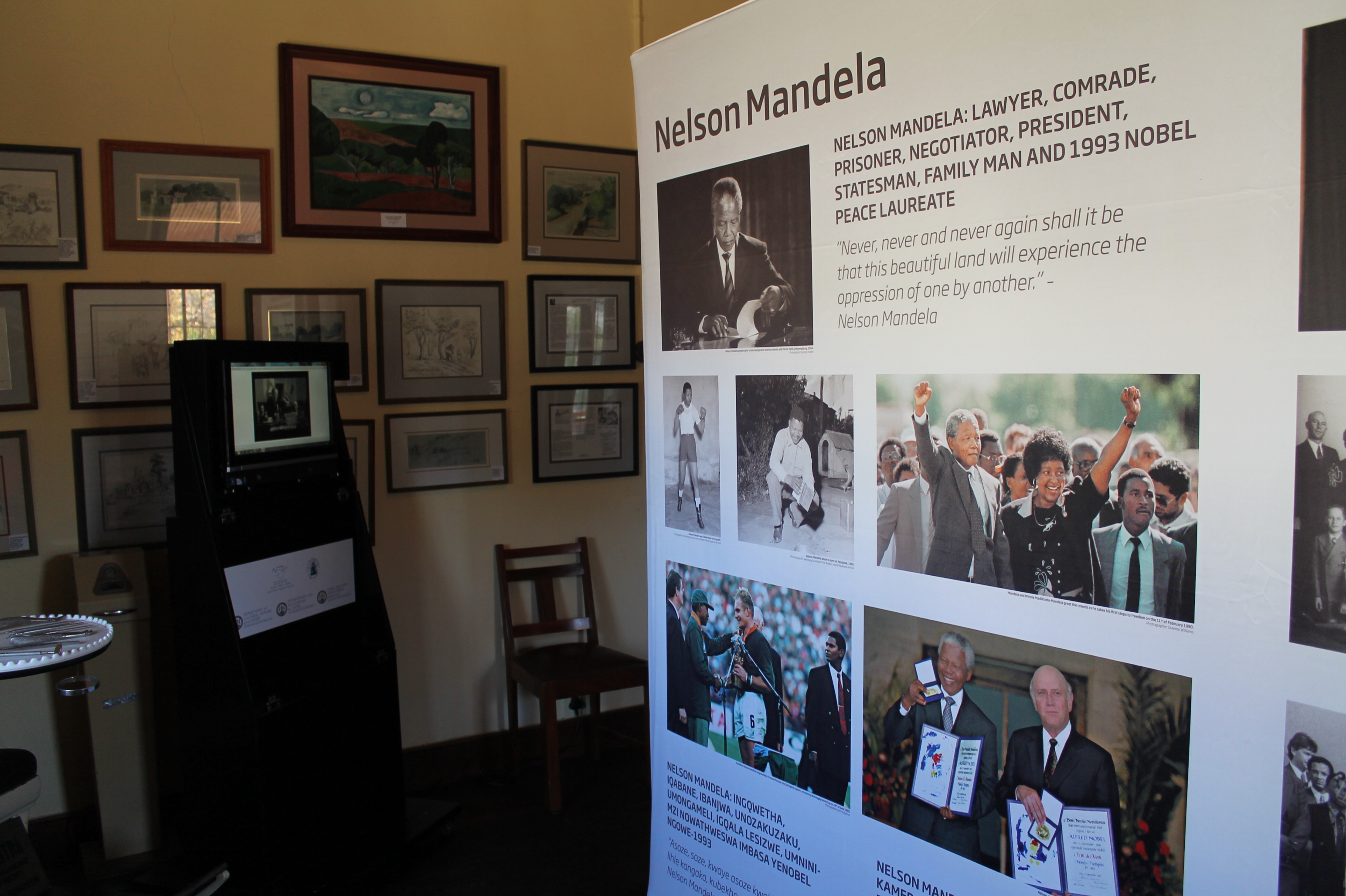
The Exhibition Room at the House, Caledon Museum. With the Peter Clarke collection.

== See also ==
- Caledon, Western Cape
- Peter Clarke (artist)
