= British Institute of Florence =

Cultural institute in Italy

Coordinates: 43°46′8.83″N 11°14′53.85″E

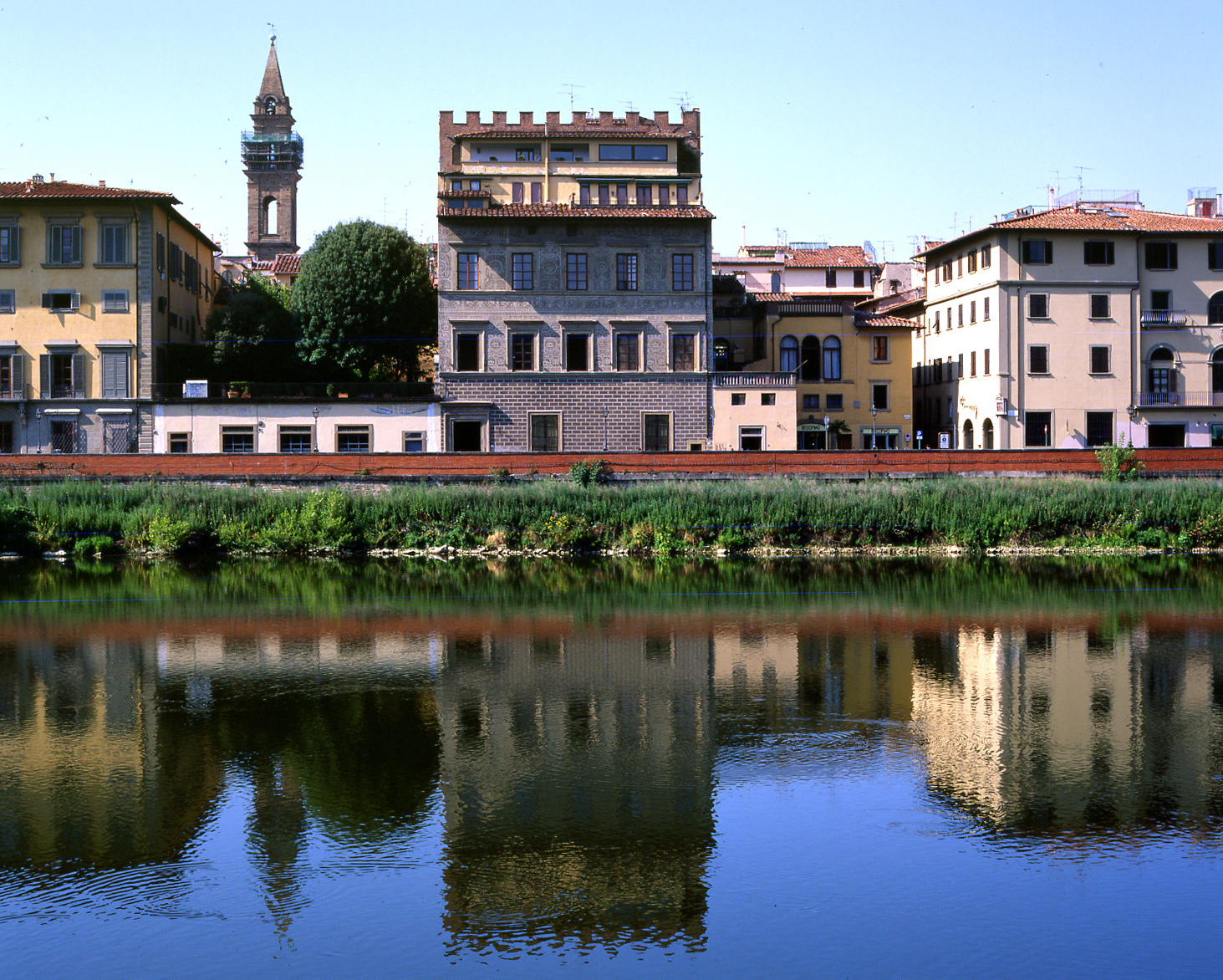
British Institute of Florence - Palazzo Lanfredini

The British Institute of Florence is a cultural institute founded in 1917 in Florence, Italy, with the aim of promoting Anglo-Italian cultural relations, teaching English and Italian languages, and running a library of English books to illustrate British and Italian literature, art, history and music. It is the oldest overseas British cultural institute in the world.

== History ==
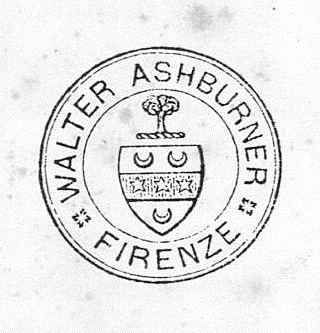
Stamp ex libris from Walter Ashburner. Fondazione BEIC

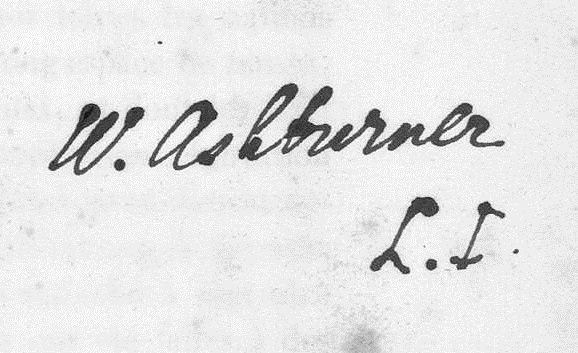
Autograph from Walter Ashburner. Fondazione BEIC

The institute was set up in late 1917, towards the end of the First World War, by a group of Anglo-Italian scholars, intellectuals and public figures who were keen to counter anti-British propaganda. Discussions had taken place shortly before the outbreak of war as to the possibility of founding an institute similar to the Institut Français de Florence (established in 1907). Among those involved in the early days of the British Institute were Walter Ashburner, Guido Biagi, Guido Ferrando, Edward Hutton, Carlo Placci, Angelo Orvieto, Gaetano Salvemini, Aldo Sorani, G.M. Trevelyan and his wife Janet Trevelyan, daughter of Mrs Humphry Ward, Herbert Trench and Lina Waterfield (née Duff Gordon), niece of Janet Ross, who first set up a library in 1916. The institute was formally opened in June 1918 by the Ambassador, Sir Rennell Rodd.

In 1923 with Rodd's assistance and with Janet Trevelyan's hard work a royal charter was applied for and granted by King George V. Among the signatories to the petition for the royal charter were the Consul C.W. Maclean; R.S. Conway, Professor of Latin at Manchester University; Arthur Acton, father of Harold Acton; R.S. Spranger; the Irish poet Herbert Trench. According to the Charter, the aims of the institute included “the promotion of the study in Italy of English language, literature, art, history, philosophy and institutions”; “the formation and maintenance in Florence of a General Library of books illustrating English and Italian culture”; and “the promotion of a good understanding between Italians and English-speaking people by providing opportunities for intellectual and social intercourse; and, as ancillary thereto, the provision of opportunities for English-speaking Students to study Italian language, literature, art, history, philosophy and institutions".

The institute occupied various premises (including the beautiful Loggia Ruccellai, where the sister of Lorenzo the Magnificent was married in 1460) before settling into the Palazzo Antinori in 1923. The library and classrooms were located in this elegant but austere building until 1966.

== Directors ==
The first two directors drew no salary and were therefore styled Honorary Directors:

Seat	Name	
1	Arthur F. Spender	1917–1922
2	Harold Goad	1922–1939
3	Francis Toye	1939–1958
4	Ian Greenlees	1958–1981
5	David Rundle	1981–1987
6	Frank Woodhouse	1987–1997
7	Christine Wilding	1997–2003
8	Vanessa Hall-Smith	2004–2011
9	Sara Milne	2011–2012
10	Julia Race	2013–2018
11	Simon Gammell	2018-

Harold Goad’s predilection for Benito Mussolini’s New Italy damaged the institute's reputation in the 1930s (he wrote a number of apologies for Fascism and the Corporate State). Its reputation was restored under the musicologist Francis Toye, who was fortunate on his return after the war to find that the library had been preserved intact: this was partly due to the dedication of the librarian Giulietta Fermi and to the protection of the Swiss Consulate. Toye was replaced in 1958 by Ian Greenlees, who had worked for the British Council of Rome and had many contacts among the Italian Left dating from his wartime experience at Radio Bari, which he founded in order to broadcast Allied propaganda. His portrait in the uniform of a Major in the British army was painted by his friend Renato Guttuso. Greenlees and his librarian Robin Chanter greatly expanded the library. '

When the lease on the Palazzo Antinori expired in the mid-1960s, Greenlees's friend Harold Acton made available three floors of the Palazzo Lanfredini, on the south side of the river, to house the library. There was not however enough room for the teaching operation, and in 1966 the school was moved to the Palazzo Spini-Feroni, in piazza Santa Trinita. Among those who served on the Board of Governors was the art historian (and foreign spy) Anthony Blunt. David Rundle, appointed director in 1981, had a background in the British Council and made contacts with the Foreign Office, whereas the Italianist Frank Woodhouse from Cambridge University established closer ties with British academic life. In 1996 the school was moved again, this time to the Palazzo dello Strozzino in piazza Strozzi. Courses of English and Italian, as well as History of Art, are given. The institute is an authorised centre for the University of Cambridge ESOL examinations. Sara Milne became director in March 2011, and was followed by Julia Race in 2013.

== Cultural programme ==
Among those who in the past have lectured or given readings at the institute are Harold Acton, Piero Bigongiari, Quentin Bell, Elizabeth Bowen, Cecil Day-Lewis, Edward Chaney, Edith Evans, Joan Haslip, Francis King, Fosco Maraini, Edwin Muir, Frank Muir, Iris Murdoch, Tim Parks, John Pope-Hennessy, Mario Praz, Lorna Sage, Edith Sitwell, Muriel Spark, Robert Speaight, William Trevor, Gore Vidal, Marina Warner, Angus Wilson; more recent speakers have included Robin Butler, Geoffrey Hill, Anthony Kenny and Alexander McCall Smith.

== Library ==
The Library of some 50,000 volumes is housed on three floors of the Palazzo Lanfredini and is claimed to be the largest lending library of English books in continental Europe. It is intended to illustrate British and Italian culture. There are substantial holdings in literature, history, music and history of art, as well as smaller sections devoted to philosophy, religion, social sciences and language. Over the years, it has received donations of books from many individuals, including Harold Acton, Bernard Berenson, John Buchan, Irene Cooper Willis (the Vernon Lee collection), Henry Furst, Victor Gollancz, Dorothy Nevile Lees (the Edward Gordon Craig collection), Henry Newbolt, Osbert Sitwell, R.S. Spranger.

== Archive ==
Since 2001 an archive has been housed in the Palazzo Lanfredini, comprising not only the institute's own records but also literary and historical collections donated over time, including the Craig, Horner, Hutton, Vernon Lee, Maquay and Waterfield collections.

== Royal visits ==
Princess Margaret visited the institute in 1972, on the occasion of the Henry Moore exhibition at Forte Belevedere in Florence. Helen, former Queen of Romania, attended lectures and concerts in the 1970s. The then Prince and Princess of Wales visited the School and Library in 1985, after Prince Charles had agreed to become the institute's patron (together with the statesman Giovanni Spadolini). Prince Charles returned in 2002. His co-patron was Signora Wanda Ferragamo until her death in 2018. Catherine, Princess of Wales (then Catherine Middleton) spent part of her gap year in 2000 here. Prince Charles returned again to Florence in March 2017, accompanied by the then Duchess of Cornwall, to celebrate the 100th anniversary of the institute.

== Trivia ==
"D.H. Lawrence went into the British Institute one day, upset by the Director’s Fascist leanings, and shouted 'This is the Anti-British Institute'. He was forcibly ejected." This anecdote was told to Hunter Davies by the Director David Rundle in 1985.
