= Jennifer Toye =

British singer and actress (1933–2022)

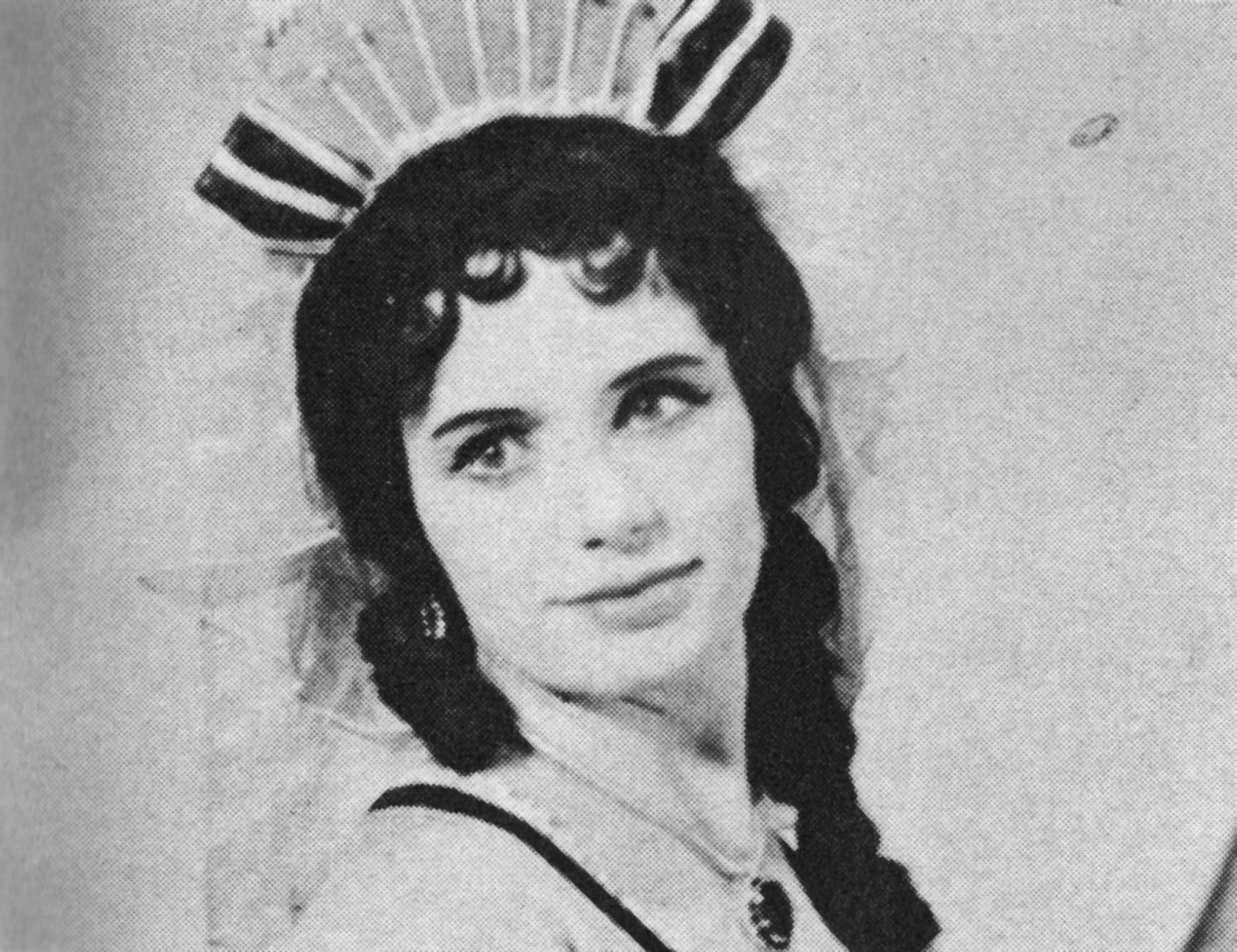
Jennifer Toye, c. 1962

Jennifer Gay Bishop (16 December 1933 – 17 January 2022), known by her stage name Jennifer Toye, was a British operatic soprano best known for performances with the D'Oyly Carte Opera Company in the 1950s and 1960s, including as Josephine in H.M.S. Pinafore, Mabel in The Pirates of Penzance and Yum-Yum in The Mikado. She later performed in musical theatre and opera with other companies.

== Life and career ==
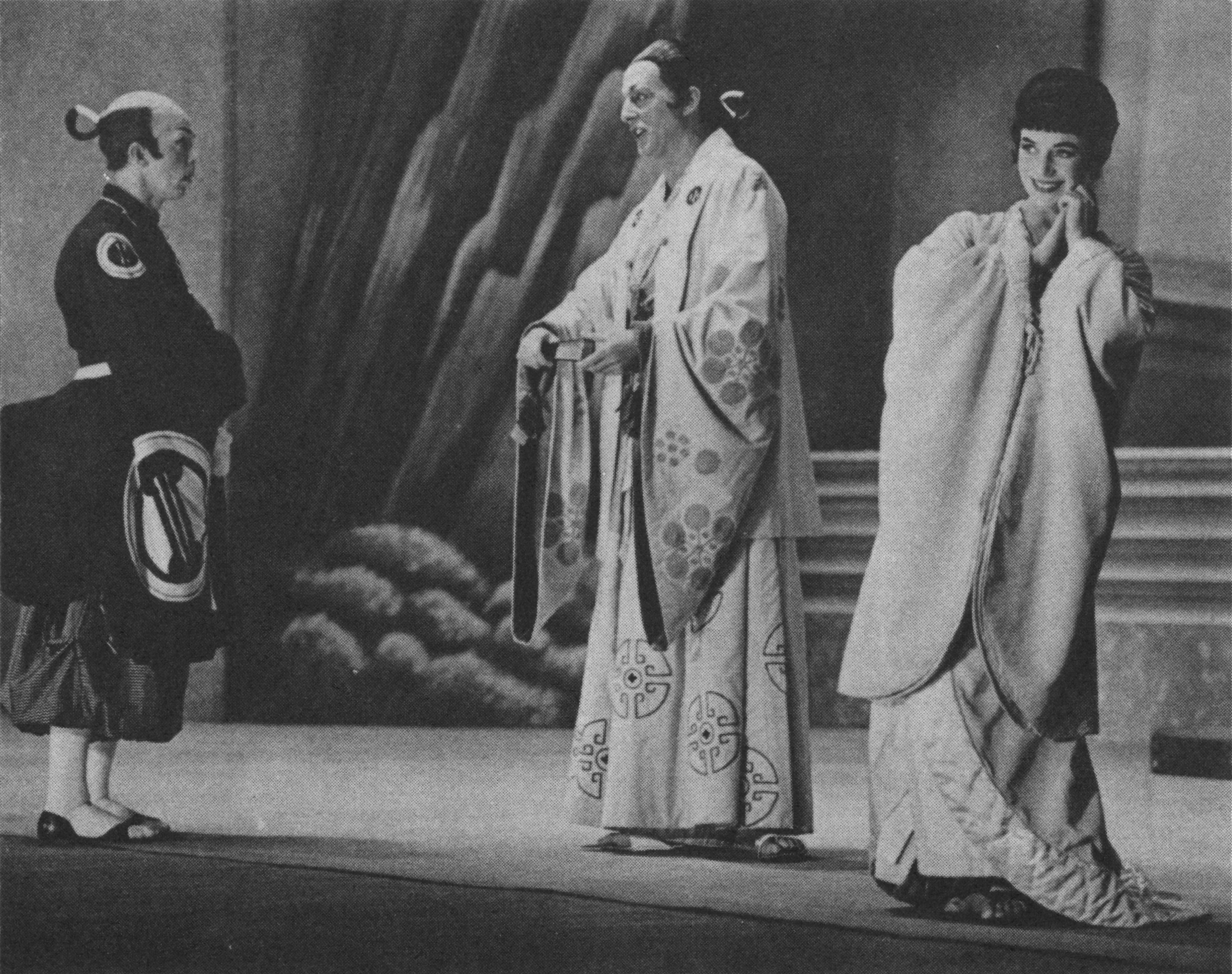
Toye as Yum-Yum in The Mikado alongside John Reed as Ko-Ko and Thomas Round as Nanki-Poo

Toye was born in Holywell, Flintshire, in North Wales, the daughter of the professional singer Eleanor Toye and her husband, Joseph Richard Bishop, a lawyer. She had a brother, Francis. Her maternal uncles included Francis and Geoffrey Toye; her use of her mother's family name as a stage name connected her with her uncles' established musical careers. She was educated at Bon Sauveur Convent, Anglesey, and studied vocal music at the British Institute of Florence, which was at the time under the direction of her uncle Francis.

In September 1953, having performed with amateur companies in North Wales, Toye joined the D'Oyly Carte Opera Company, of which her uncle Geoffrey had been musical director in the 1920s. In the 1954–55 season she was given the small roles of Ada and Chloe in Princess Ida. In 1957 she sang the Plaintiff in Trial by Jury, Sacharissa in Princess Ida and Kate in The Yeomen of the Guard, and added Casilda in The Gondoliers the following season.

In May 1960 Toye was promoted to principal soprano in succession to Jean Hindmarsh and took on the roles of Josephine in H.M.S. Pinafore, Mabel in The Pirates of Penzance, Lady Ella in Patience and Elsie Maynard in The Yeomen of the Guard. The following season she added Yum-Yum in The Mikado, Lady Psyche in Princess Ida, and Celia in Iolanthe. She also made occasional appearances as Phyllis in Iolanthe and Zorah in Ruddigore during the 1963–64 season. She continued to perform with D'Oyly Carte until 1965. Having joined the company for experience, she told a press reporter that she felt it time to move on: "I can't pretend I'm here for experience any more … I'm not tired of it at all, but if I'm ever to get any other experience the time is now".

During her time with D'Oyly Carte, Toye took part in two tours of North America. During the second tour she married a flautist in April 1965. While with the company she also took part in concert performances ranging from Bach's St John Passion to Gilbert and Sullivan miscellanies with D'Oyly Carte colleagues.

After leaving D'Oyly Carte, Toye appeared on a cruise ship for nine months and on stage in Lock Up Your Daughters in York, on television with Arthur Askey and the Fol-de-Rols, and in pantomime in the title role in Cinderella, and as the Empress in Aladdin. In the early 1970s she was a member of the chorus of Sadler's Wells Opera (later English National Opera) company, where she sang in a wide range of operas by composers from Monteverdi to Wagner. She left that company in the mid-1970s to care for her father during his final illness. In 1979, she married Michael Rees, a business executive; they settled in Kingston-Upon-Thames, where they operated a bespoke hardwood joinery business for the next 30 years.

Toye died on 17 January 2022, at the age of 88.

== Recordings ==
On recordings made by the D'Oyly Carte Opera Company, Toye performs as Peep-Bo in the 1957 Mikado, as Celia in the 1960 Iolanthe, as Casilda in the 1961 Gondoliers and as Lady Ella in the 1961 Patience. She also voices Zorah in the 1967 Halas and Batchelor animated film of Ruddigore.

== Sources ==
- Gilbert, Susie (2009). Opera for Everybody. London: Faber and Faber. ISBN 978-0-571-22493-7.
- Rollins, Cyril; R. John Witts (1962). The D'Oyly Carte Opera Company in Gilbert and Sullivan Operas: A Record of Productions, 1875–1961. London: Michael Joseph. OCLC 504581419.
- Rollins, Cyril; R. John Witts (1966). The D'Oyly Carte Opera Company in Gilbert and Sullivan Operas: A Record of Productions, Supplement 1. Sutton Coldfield: C. Rollins. OCLC 225338750.
