= Cook's Night Out =

1937 British TV cooking series

- Genre: Cooking
- Presented by: Marcel Boulestin
- Country of origin: United Kingdom
- Original language: English
- No. of series: 1
- No. of episodes: 5

Original release
- Network: BBC
- Release: 1937

Cook's Night Out is a 1937 British television series which aired on the BBC. It was a cooking show featuring Marcel Boulestin. The series consisted of five episodes, with Boulestin demonstrating how to make a different dish in each episode. The five dishes could be served separately, or form a five-course dinner together.

It was one of the very earliest cooking TV shows, though there had been radio cooking shows prior to this.

Boulestin continued to work on BBC TV, hosting "Dish of the Month" (1937) and "Foundations of Cookery" (1939).

No footage remains of the series, as it aired live, and methods to record live television did not exist until late 1947, and were used very rarely by the BBC until the mid-1950s.
