= Estelle Thompson (painter) =

British-Barbadian abstract painter

Estelle Thompson (born 1960) is a British abstract painter who lives and works in London and Barbados.

== Biography ==
Estelle Thompson graduated with an MA in painting from the Royal College of Art in 1986 and received a BA (Hons) in Fine Art from Sheffield City Polytechnic (1979–82). Thompson has exhibited internationally, curated exhibitions and received major commissions to incorporate colour in the built environment of public buildings across the UK. She is currently Head of Graduate Painting at the Slade School of Fine Art in London.

Thompson's studio practice as a painter and printmaker centres on painted colour, form, space and geometry. Her work references the history of abstract painting and is informed by contemporary aesthetics and colour research.

Thompson's works are held in major public collections including the Arts Council of Great Britain, the British Council, the British Museum and the New York Public Library. Her public commissions include Milton Keynes Theatre; the Women's Centre at the John Radcliffe Hospital, Oxford; the South Bristol Community Hospital and Quaglino's, London (commissioned by Sir Terence Conran).

Her artwork was presented to Dame Ninette de Valois for the Prudential Award for the Arts 1990/Arts Council Special Award. In 2001, a monograph, Estelle Thompson, was published by Merrell (ISBN 1858941520). In 2012, she organised and curated the exhibition Frank Bowling and Dennis de Caires at the Oriel Sycharth Gallery, Wrexham and in 2019 she was commissioned for the audio guide to Frank Bowling at Tate Britain.

== Solo exhibitions ==
- 2021 Estelle Thompson: In Deep, The Brighton Storeroom, Barbados
- 2016 Estelle Thompson, Artist of The Day, Flowers Gallery, London
- 2014 White Lies, Oriel Sycharth Gallery, Wrexham
- 2009 Estelle Thompson, Purdy Hicks Gallery, London [cat.]
- 2006 Estelle Thompson: Recent Paintings, Purdy Hicks Gallery, London [cat.]
- 2004 True Colours, Wetterling Gallery, Stockholm [cat.]
- 2003 Estelle Thompson, Purdy Hicks Gallery, London [cat.]
- 2001 Being Here: New Paintings, The New Art Gallery Walsall [cat.]; Punctuation Paintings, Purdy Hicks Gallery, London [cat.]
- 2000 Estelle Thompson, Angel Row Gallery, Nottingham; Purdy Hicks Gallery, London [cat.]
- 1999 Estelle Thompson, Galerie Helmut Pabst, Frankfurt; Purdy Hicks Gallery, London
- 1998 Fuse Paintings 1996–1998, Usher Gallery, Lincoln; Mead Gallery, Warwick; The Bracknell Gallery, Bracknell; Purdy Hicks Gallery, London [cat.]
- 1997 Estelle Thompson, Abbot Hall Art Gallery, Kendal
- 1996 Estelle Thompson, Purdy Hicks Gallery, London; Galerie Helmut Pabst, Frankfurt [cat.]; Estelle Thompson, Banks Hoggins O’Shea, London
- 1993 Estelle Thompson Paintings 1992–93, Purdy Hicks Gallery, London; Towner Art Gallery, Eastbourne & Darlington Arts Centre [cat.]

== Collections ==
- Arts Council of Great Britain
- British Council
- British Museum
- New York Public Library
- Contemporary Art Society
- Abbot Hall Art Gallery
- Ferens Art Gallery
- Pallant House Gallery
- Oldham Art Gallery
- Towner Art Gallery
- The New Art Gallery Walsall
- Chelsea and Westminster Hospital
- New Hall College, Cambridge
- De Montfort University
- University of Warwick
- Wrexham Glyndwr University
- Deutsche Bank

== Public commissions ==
Women's Centre, John Radcliffe Hospital, Oxford (2018); Centre for the Creative Industries, Wrexham (2012); Catrin Finch Centre, Wrexham (2011); South Bristol Community Hospital (2011); The Orchard Centre, Hull (2010); Milton Keynes Theatre (1999); Quaglino's, London (1993)

== Curation ==
Tessa Whitehead, John Cox: Life’s Balance (2021); Kraig Yearwood: This is How Our Garden Grows and THE BLUE, The Brighton Storeroom, Barbados (2020); Heaven and Earth: selection from the Methodist Modern Art Collection, (2015); I was a Teenage Cave Girl and other work: Edward Allington, Oriel Sycharth Gallery, Wrexham (2013); Back and Forth: Eight Artists from London, B55 Gallery, Budapest, (with Tamas Jovanovics), (cat.); Frank Bowling and Dennis de Caires and Art and Industry (2012); Dance of Life Mural by Mildred Eldridge (2011); The Art of Function and Maurice Cockrill: Selected Works (2010) and Fair Play by Foul Means, Oriel Sycharth Gallery (2009)
