= Peter Clarke (artist) =

South African artist and writer (1929–2014)

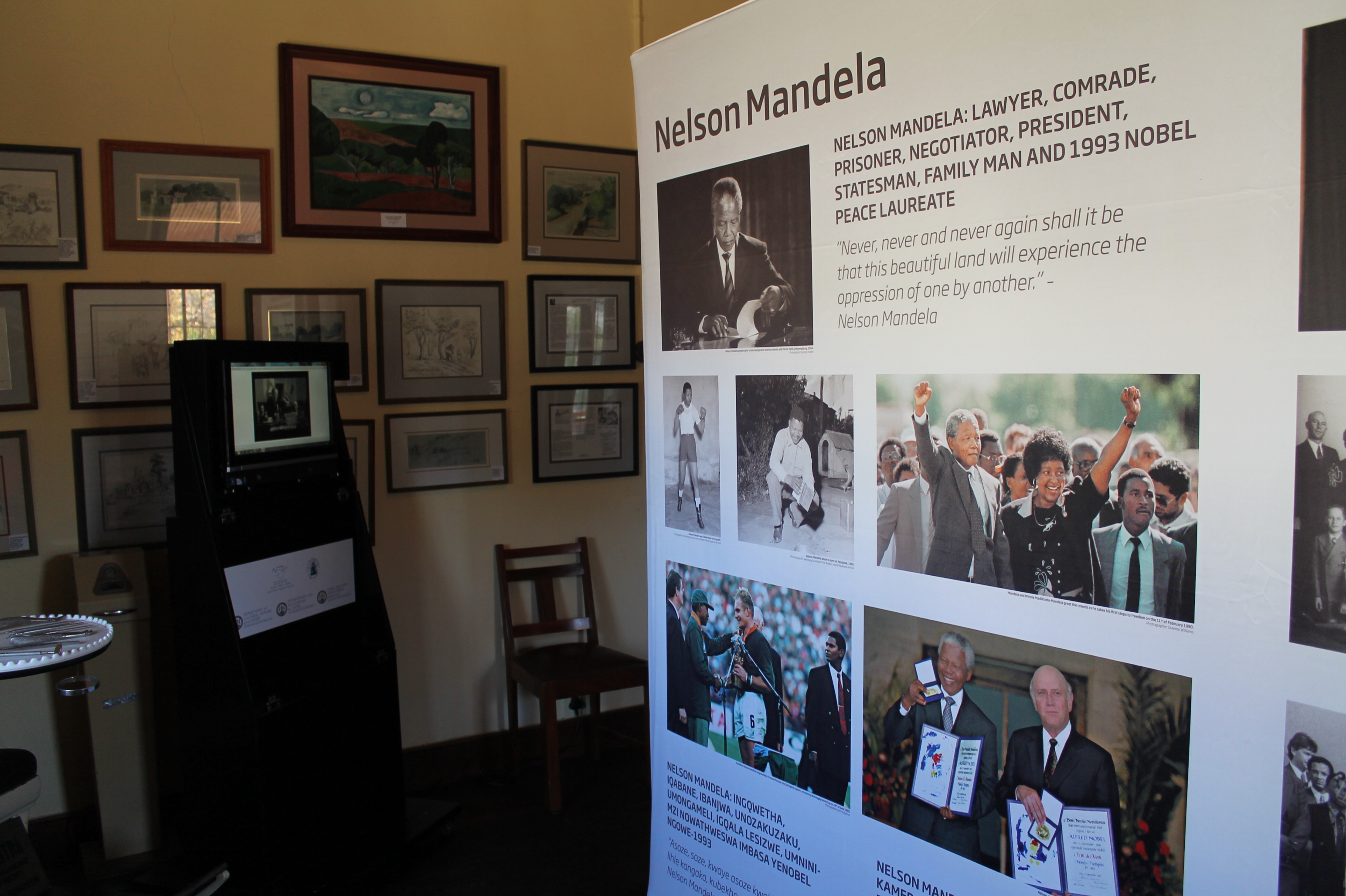
The Exhibition Room at the House, Caledon Museum, Western Cape, South Africa. With The Peter Clarke collection.

Peter Clarke (2 June 1929 – 13 April 2014) was a South African visual artist working across a broad spectrum of media. He was also a writer and poet.

== Early life ==
Clarke was born in Simon's Town near Cape Town, in 1929. Much of his work is inspired by that coastal village where he lived until 1972, when he was forced to move to Ocean View under the Group Areas Act. He left high school in 1944 and was a dock worker until 1956 when, aged 27, during a three-month holiday to Tesselaarsdal, a small farming village near Caledon in the South West Cape, he began his artistic career.

With assistance from his lifelong friend, poet James Matthews, Clarke held his first solo exhibition in the newsroom of the newspaper The Golden City Post in 1957. He said, "Before my exhibition, I was just another coloured man. Our people took it for granted that only whites could do such things. Now they are becoming aware of the fact that we can do these things too; that we are human beings!"

== Education ==
- 1948: Technical College, Roeland Street, Cape Town, SA
- 1961: Michaelis School of Fine Art, University of Cape Town – etching classes
- 1962-3: Rijksakademie van Beeldende Kunsten – graphics
- 1978-9: Atelier Nord (Graphic Art Workshop) in Oslo

== Art career ==
Clarke was best known for his graphic prints, particularly his woodcuts, and in later years he moved into collage. He also used leather, glass, found objects and other mixed media. He used oil pastels for his art work "October Landscape".

His artistic career spanned more than six decades and he produced a large number of works and appeared in many exhibitions. Described as a "quiet chronicler", his work offers a critique of South Africa's social and political history over 60 years.

He received six international and six national awards for his art and writing, and had more than 70 solo exhibitions since 1957 in South Africa, Nigeria, Kenya, Australia, USA, Norway, Israel, Austria and the UK. He also had many group shows in South Africa, Yugoslavia, Germany, Brazil, Austria, Italy, USA, Argentina, Norway, Botswana, Japan, Switzerland and France. In 2005 he was awarded the Order of Ikhamanga (Silver) by President Thabo Mbeki, and received a Lifetime Achievement Award in 2010. His 2011 exhibition was entitled Listening To Distant Thunder.

A major Retrospective exhibition of his work, Wind Blowing on the Cape Flats, took place in London in 2013.

=== Awards and recognition ===
Among the honours Clarke received were 27 international awards in writing and art (Italy, USA and Taiwan), including Honorary Life Membership of the Museum of African American Art, Los Angeles (1984); six South African awards for writing and art, including three since 2000—notably the Order of Ikhamanga, silver class (2005); and the Molteno Award (2000) for services to the visual arts, from the Cape Tercentenary Foundation.

- 1955: Drum International Short Story Award
- 1965: Awarded the Accademico Onorario of the Accademia delle Arti del Disegno, Florence, Italy
- 1975: Elected Honorary Fellow in Writing, University of Iowa, US
- 1982: Diploma of Merit in Literature, Universita delle Arti, Italy
- 1983: Diploma of Merit in Art, Academia Italia
- 1983: Honorary Life Member of the Museum of African American Art, LA, US
- 1984: Elected Honorary Doctor of Literature, World Academy of Arts and Culture, Taipei, Taiwan

Key dates

- 1929: Peter Clarke was born
- 1957: Golden City Post, Cape Town, South Africa (first solo)
- 1960: Yugoslavia (SA Graphic Art)
- 1961: Galerie Schoninger, Munich, West Germany (SA Graphic Art)
- 1961: São Paulo Biennial
- 1963: 5th International Graphic Art Biennale, Ljubljana, Yugoslavia, Albertina Museum, Vienna, Austria (International Graphic Art)
- 1964: Venice, Italy (Biennale)
- 1965: Mbari Cultural Centre, Ibadan, Nigeria (solo)
  - Chem-Chemi Cultural Centre, Nairobi, Kenya (solo)
  - 6th International Graphic Art Biennale, Ljubljana, Yugoslavia
- 1968: Palazzo Strozzo, Florence, Italy (First Exhibition of International Graphics)
- 1969: Palazzo Strozzo, Italy (Second Exhibition of International Graphics)
- 1970: Edrich Gallery, Stellenbosch (solo)
- 1971: SA Graphic Art touring Netherlands, Belgium and W. Germany
- 1972: Buenos Aires, Argentina (Tercera Bienal Internacional del Grabado)
- 1973: Shell Harbour Art Centre, Shell Harbour, NSW Australia (solo)
  - Pratt Graphics Centre, New York City (group)
- 1973–74: Fisk University, Nashville, Tennessee, US (solo)
- 1976: Kuumba Workshop, Southside, Chicago, US (solo)
- 1977–78: SAAA, Cape Town (Our World is a Ghetto – solo)
  - Community Arts Project, Mowbray, Cape Town (solo)
  - Public Library, Grassy Park, Cape Town (solo)
- 1978–79: Sandvika Kino Vestibyle, Sandvika, Norway
- 1979–82: Atelier Nord, Oslo, Norway (Graphic Art – group)
- 1979: Pratt Institute, New York
- 1981: Atlantic Art Gallery, Cape Town (Illusions and Other Realities – solo)
- 1982: South African Art, National Gallery, Gaborone, Botswana
- 1983: Kanagawa, Japan (International Exhibition of Prints)
- 1984: SANG (Masterworks on Paper), Kanagawa, Japan (International Exhibition of Prints), Jerusalem Artists' House, Israel, Frederikstad, Norway (Norwegian International Print Biennale)
- 1985: FUBA (A Selection of Work by Distinguished Black Artists), Grenchen, Switzerland (X Internationale Triennale Fur Originale Graphik)
- 1987: Chelsea Gallery, Wynberg, Cape Town (solo), Campinas, Brazil (Bienal Internacional de Gravura), Museum fur Volkerkunde, Frankfurt, W. Germany
- 1990: Freedom Now, Namibian independence exhibition, Windhoek, Namibia
- 1992: Retrospective exhibition – The Hand is the Tool of the Soul, at Natale Labia Museum, Muizenberg, Cape Town
- 1994: 3rd Triennial World Exhibition of Prints, Auvergne, France
- 1995: 18th Triennial World Exhibition of Prints, Kanagawa, Japan
- 1996: Drawings of Tesselaarsdal, Caledon Museum
- 1998: Vital Expressions, Association of Arts Gallery, Bellville, South Africa
- 1999: Lipschitz Gallery – A Personal View, Cape Town
- 1999: Vital Expressions at Natal Technikon Art Gallery, Durban
- 2000: Bertolt Brecht House, Berlin, Germany
- 2000–01: City Press exhibition called Baggage
- 2001: Manuscript Exhibition 3 (Art Studio), Johannesburg
- 2001: Solo exhibition in Exeter, UK
- 2002: Collection of books at Natal Technikon, KwaZulu-Natal
- 2003: AVA, Cape Town: Surface=/=Print (part of Impact conference)
- 2011: Listening To Distant Thunder, The SA National Gallery

=== Collections ===
Clarke's work is in the collections of the Arnold Becher Museum, SA; Baerum Kommune, Sandvika, Norway; Caledon Museum, Caledon, SA; Cape Town City Library, SA; Community Arts Project, SA; Dennis W. Koles, Kiama, NSW, Australia; District Six Museum, CT, SA; Durban Art Museum, SA; Fisk University, Nashville, Tennessee, US; Fuba Collection, Johannesburg, SA; Hymie and Jean Berndt, Kenilworth, SA; Johnson Publishing Co., Chicago, US; King George VI Art Gallery, PE, SA; Kunsthalle Museen der Stadt Bielefeld, Germany; Library of Congress, Washington D.C., US; Livingstone High School, Claremont, SA; Municipal Collection, Fish Hoek, SA; Municipal Museum, Simon's Town, SA; Museum of African American Art, LA, US; Museum of Contemporary Art, Skopje, Yugoslavia; Natal Technikon, Durban, SA; National Museum and Art Gallery, Gaborone, Botswana, PAM; Nasou Publishing Co, CT, SA; National Art Gallery, Gaborone, Botswana, Pentech, Bellville, SA; Pretoria Art Museum, Pretoria, SA; SA Fine Worsted Co, CT, SA; Sasol Collection, Stellenbosch, SA; Stichting Afrika Museum, Berg en Dal, Holland; South African National Gallery; University of Fort Hare, Alice, SA; University of the North-West, SA; University of Stellenbosch, SA; University of the Western Cape, SA; University of Zululand, SA; William Humphreys Art Gallery, Kimberley, SA; and the Bruce Campbell Smith Collection.

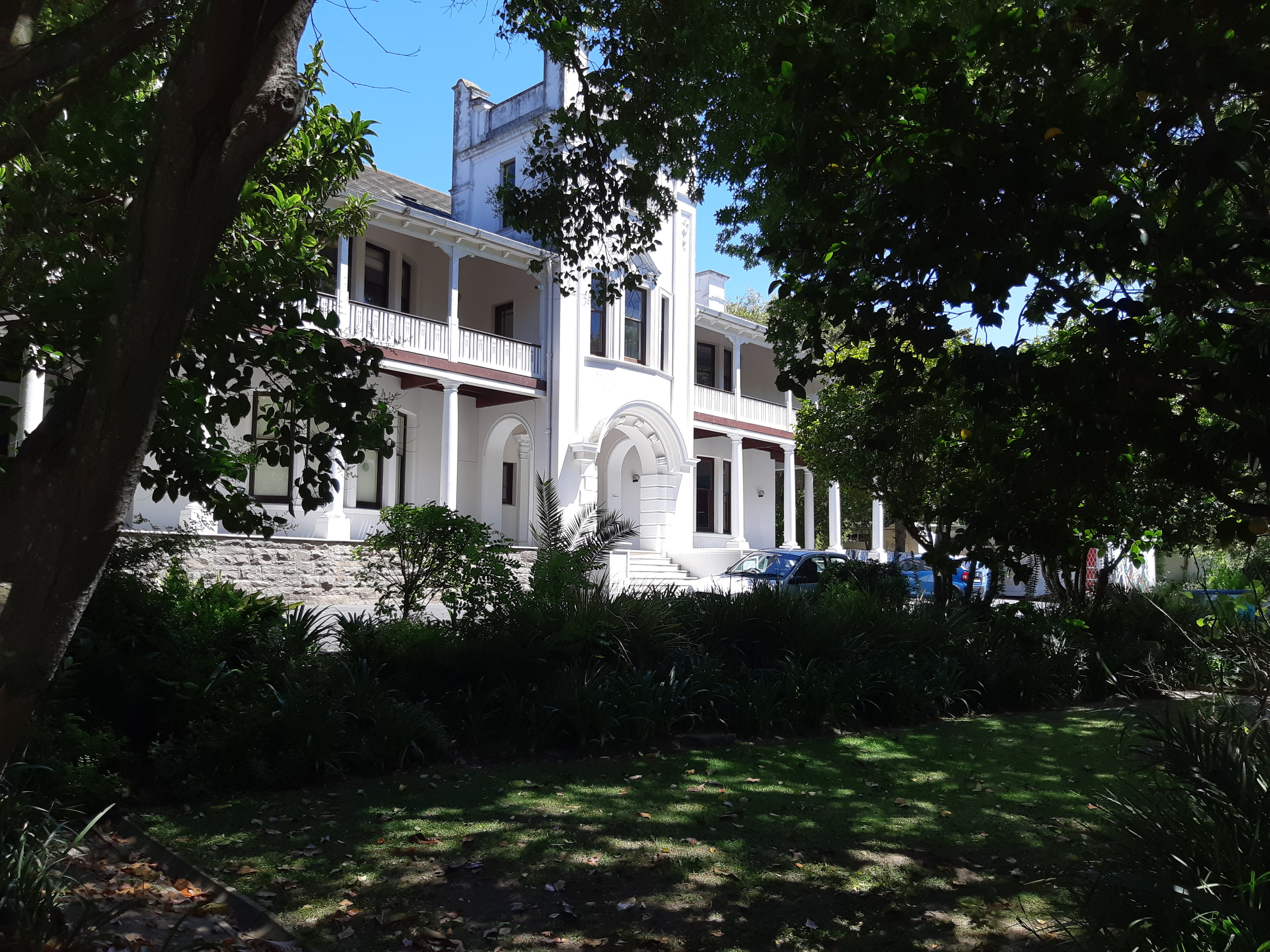
Peter Clarke Art Centre, named after the artist as a former artist in residency.

== Honours ==
In 2016 the Peter Clarke Art Centre, formally the Frank Joubert Art Centre, was named after him.
