= Francis Toye =

English music critic (1883–1964)

John Francis Toye (27 January 1883 – 13 October 1964) was an English music critic, teacher, writer and educational administrator. After early efforts as a composer and novelist, and service in naval intelligence in World War I, he became music critic of The Morning Post from 1925 to 1937, which he combined with teaching singing and working as managing director of the Restaurant Boulestin in London.

In 1939 Toye was appointed director of the British Institute of Florence, but the outbreak of World War II forced him to leave Italy in 1940. During the war, he served as director of the Sociedade Brasileira de Cultura Inglesa, Rio de Janeiro. Toye returned to the institute in Florence in 1946. He retired in 1958 but continued to live in Florence for the rest of his life.

Toye published novels, a play, autobiographies, essays and some works of music, but the book generally regarded as his most important was Giuseppe Verdi: His Life and Music, published in 1931, which remained the standard English work on its subject for many years.

== Biography ==
=== Early years ===
Toye was born in Winchester, Hampshire, the eldest son of Arlingham James Toye and his wife Alice Fayrer née Coates. His father was a schoolmaster at Winchester College who had a strong interest in music. Francis's younger brother was the composer and conductor Geoffrey Toye, whose son was John, a long-time news anchor for Scottish Television, and his niece became a soprano with the D'Oyly Carte Opera Company under the name Jennifer Toye.

Toye was educated at Winchester and Trinity College, Cambridge, where he studied languages. He was intended for a career in the diplomatic service, and passed the Foreign Office examination for student interpretership in the Levant in 1904. He resigned from the service in 1906 and studied singing and composition with teachers including E. J. Dent.

Toye began as a music critic in 1908 on the weekly magazine Vanity Fair. In the years leading up to World War I, he also produced a variety of works, including a short play, The Extra Shilling; incidental music (jointly with his brother Geoffrey) for The Well in the Wood, a "pastoral masque" by C. M. A. Peake; a sonata for piano and flute, performed at the Steinway Hall in London in 1910; magazine articles on a wide variety of subjects, from "The Theory of Feminism" for a suffragette paper, The Englishwoman, to "Opera in England" for The English Review; a comic novel written jointly with Marcel Boulestin; and a second novel, written alone, Diana and Two Symphonies. Toye suggested that this book, which advocated the need to advance the cause of English music through the formation of a "National Association of Musicians", inspired the formation of the British Music Society.

=== World War I to World War II ===
In 1914 Toye married the American author Ann Huston Miller, known as "Nina". There were no children of the marriage, which lasted until Toye's death fifty years later. In World War I, he served in various capacities in the War Office from 1914 to 1917, then transferred to the intelligence department of the Admiralty, where he served in London and at Scapa Flow. He went into commerce in 1920 and spent two years as manager of the coinage department of the Mond Nickel Company. He then worked for The Daily Express, first as a leader-writer and then as a music critic. In 1925 he was appointed music critic of The Morning Post and was active in London journalism until The Morning Post was absorbed into The Daily Telegraph in 1937. After that, he wrote a weekly column, "The Charm of Music", in The Illustrated London News.

The Times wrote of this period of Toye's life: "His tastes were Latin as against the generally Teutonic atmosphere of London music, being however an ardent Handelian; he was interested in singing and even gave lessons in the art. He formulated his creed in a book, The Well-Tempered Musician", published in 1925 by Methuen with a preface by Hugh Walpole. Sir Keith Falkner, Director of the Royal College of Music in London, praised Toye as a teacher of singing: "He was a teacher with a fine ear and down-to-earth knowledge". Toye's love of singing and of Italian music were deployed in his most important book, Giuseppe Verdi: His Life and Music, published in 1931, which for many years remained the standard English authority on its subject. He followed it with a rather lighter treatment of Rossini in Rossini: A Study in Tragi-Comedy in 1934.

In addition to his writing, Toye was a frequent broadcaster, delivering regular talks about music on the main BBC station between 1926 and 1931. From 1933 to 1939, Toye combined his musical work with the post of managing director of the Restaurant Boulestin in Covent Garden, one of the most famous restaurants of its day, with an international reputation.

=== Florence and Rio ===
In 1939 Toye was appointed director of the British Institute of Florence, an institution dedicated to teaching English language and literature to Italians. Shortly after Toye's appointment, the Institute announced the forthcoming establishment of a new branch in Naples, with further branches to follow in Genoa, Turin and Palermo. but his work was cut short when Italy entered World War II in May 1940. He was forced to flee from Italy, and for some time he and his wife were reported missing, but they returned safely to England. In 1941 Toye accepted the post of director of the Sociedade Brasileira de Cultura Inglesa, in Rio de Janeiro, Brazil, which he held from 1941 to 1945, combining this position, between 1943 and 1945, with the post of British Council representative in Brazil.

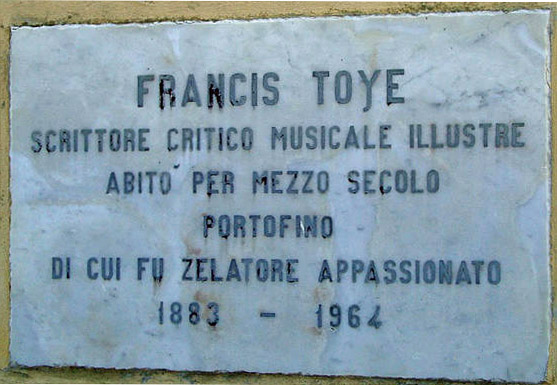
Memorial plaque for Toye in Portofino, Italy

After the end of the war, the Toyes returned to Florence, where they lived for the rest of Toye's life. In 1946 he resumed the directorship of the British Institute, whose premises and "magnificent library" had survived the war intact. The Times later wrote, "he devoted a dozen years to the work of the institute with success founded on his love of Italy and his reputation as one of the line of English eccentrics." He wrote two volumes of autobiography, For What We Have Received (1948) and Truly Thankful (1957). Toye retired from the directorship of the institute in 1958, bought a farm near Florence, where he grew vines, and "added a good deal of spice and gaiety to the musical life of London and to that of the English colony in Italy." He visited London regularly and contributed notices to The Times of the Maggio Musicale Fiorentino.

Toye died in Florence at the age of 81. His fellow critic, Neville Cardus, wrote of him, in an obituary tribute in The Guardian, "Years ago he was critic for the old Morning Post, and as typical a Morning Post man as well could be, distinguished in presence, a connoisseur of music, good food, and wine, rather unapproachable at first sight, but once known extremely likeable, a representative in excelsis of the old school, fastidious yet humane." The Gramophone called him "the man who loved Verdi this side of idolatry, and who loved Handel and Sullivan no less. His books on Verdi and Rossini will always be well thumbed, and the restoration of the supremacy of Italian opera in England owes much to his advocacy."
