= Foundations of Cookery =

1939 British TV cookery series

Foundations of Cookery is a British television series which aired in 1939 on the BBC. The 15-minute series provided cooking advice. Marcel Boulestin was the host.

The episode telecast 24 February aired at 9:25PM, preceded by news and followed by a cartoon, on a schedule which also included a show about fashion called Vanity Fair, a music programme called Music Makers and an episode of Telecrime. (see page 17)

None of the episodes still exist, as they aired live, and methods used to record live television did not exist until late 1947, and were used very rarely by the BBC until around 1953–1955.
