= D&D London =

Restaurant group based in London, England

- Established: 1991
- Founders: Terence Conran; Joel Kissin
- Founded at: London, England
- Type: Restaurant group
- Headquarters: London, England
- Official language: English
- Website: danddlondon.com

D&D London is a restaurant group based in London with properties in London, Birmingham, Manchester, Leeds, Paris and New York. It was founded by Terence Conran as Conran Restaurants until 2007, when Conran sold 49% of the business to Des Gunewardena and David Loewi, formerly managers in the group, who rebranded it D&D.

Terence Conran entered the restaurant business in 1953, with his Soup Kitchen. In 1954, he opened The Orrery, and in 1970, the Neal Street Restaurant. His Bibendum, opened in 1987, was more influential. Later opening included the Blueprint Cafe, the Pont de la Tour, Quaglino's, Butler's Wharf Chop House and many more.

The Conran Restaurants group was founded with Conran's business partner Joel Kissin in 1991.

Conran received the Lifetime Achievement Award from The Caterer in 2017, which named him "an extraordinary individual who has been making an indelible and exceptional mark on the restaurant and wider hospitality sector for more than 64 years."
