= Mint sauce =

Sauce made of chopped mint

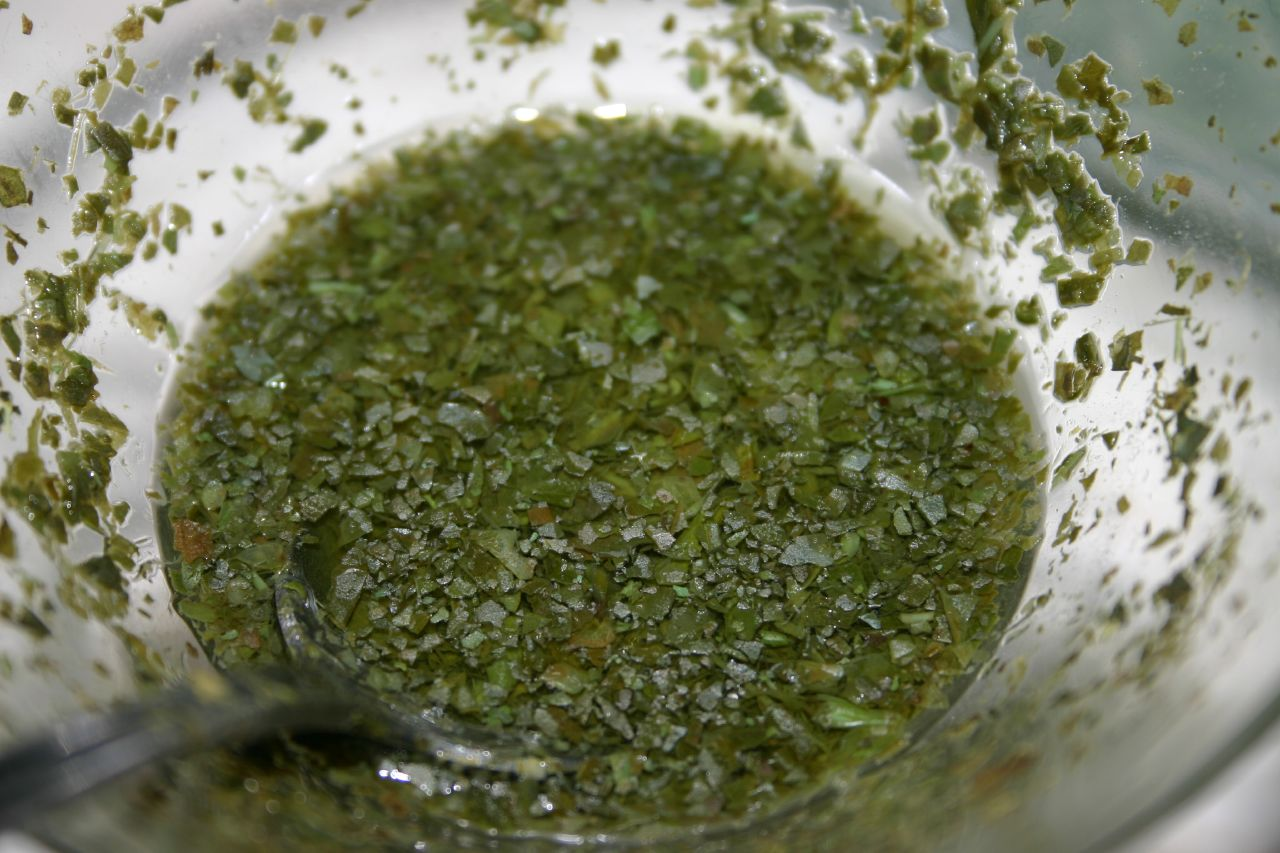
Mint sauce

Mint sauce is a green sauce popular in the United Kingdom, made from finely chopped spearmint leaves soaked in vinegar, and a small amount of sugar. It is a traditional accompaniment to roast lamb.

== Background ==
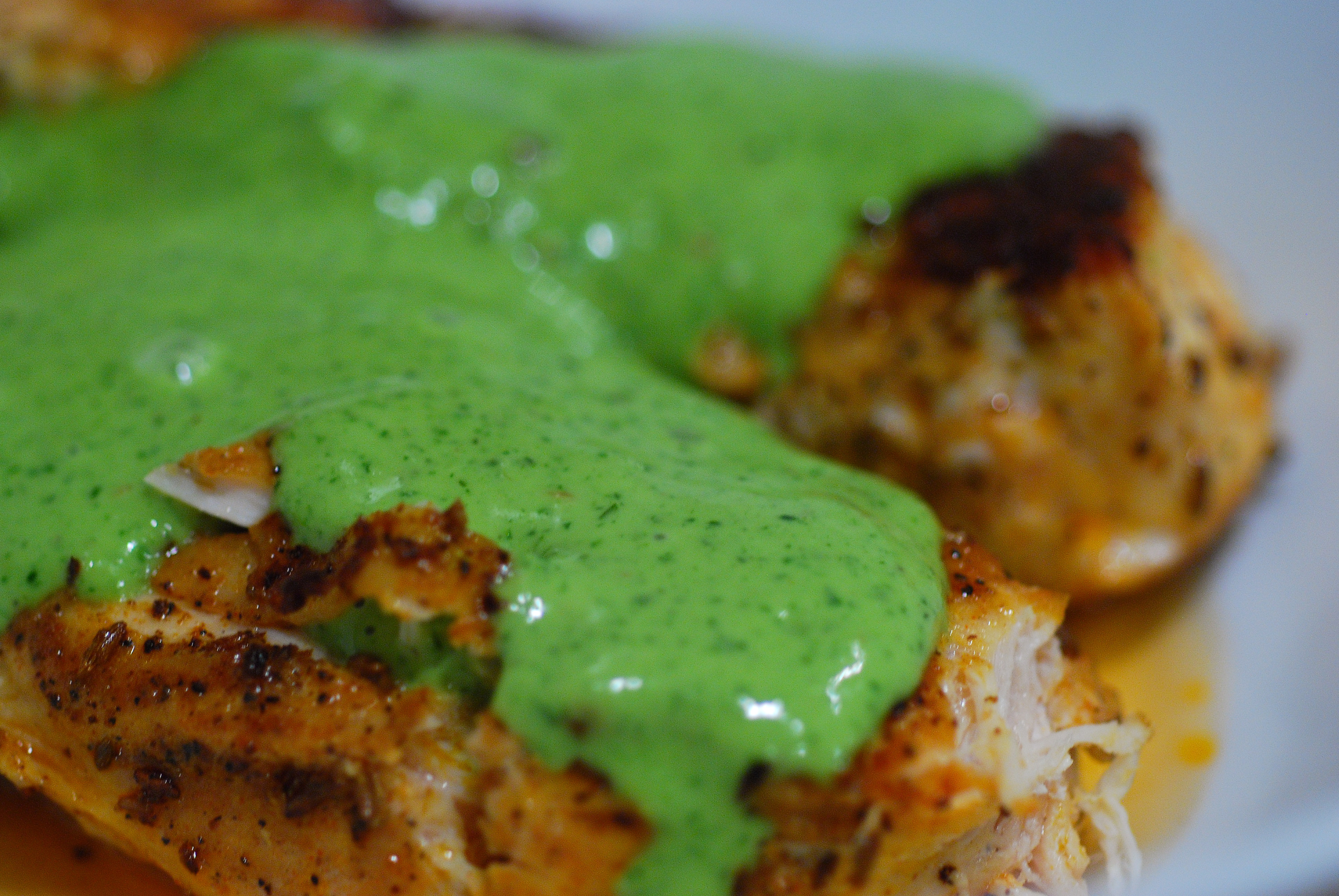
Close-up of parsley mint sauce on Spanish spice rubbed chicken

There are many different species of mint, but the one used most widely in Western cooking is spearmint (Mentha spicata). It is native to the Mediterranean area but is found in many other parts of Europe and in North America. The Oxford Companion to Food calls it "[v]ery widely cultivated and used ... 'the mint' of cooks, the one commonly used for mint sauce and for flavouring new potatoes and peas, in Arab mint tea, etc."

The Ancient Roman naturalist Pliny the Elder wrote that mint "stirs up the mind to a greedy taste in meat". The later Roman writer Apicius gave a recipe for mint sauce which he said complemented the flavours of roast lamb (or suckling kid). By the Middle Ages mint was commonly found in European medicinal and kitchen gardens, as well as growing wild.

On the origins of mint sauce, the food historian Dorothy Hartley wrote, "Most sheep had their lambs down in the warm valley grazing lands where the streams ran, and mint grew in abundance. Hence mint sauce with lamb." Mint sauce was being made in today’s England as early as the 3rd century, and the practice of serving it with lamb was well established in English cooking before the mid-18th century.

In the Middle Ages green sauces made with mint or other herbs were common in French and Italian cuisine, but their use declined as Europe entered the Modern Era. Louis Eustache Ude commented in an 1816 recipe for roast lamb, "In France we serve it up with maître d'hôtel but in England you send up with gravy under it, and in a sauceboat mint-sauce with sugar and vinegar. Marcel Boulestin wrote in 1936, "I think I am one of the very few French people who genuinely like mint sauce", and he reported his father's view: "'Do you mean to say that they really eat mint with lamb? ... What a funny country'".

== Ingredients ==
According to Florence Jack in her 1914 Cookery for Every Household, mint sauce contains chopped fresh mint, brown sugar, and malt vinegar, mixed with boiling water and left to stand for several hours before serving. In Spices, Salt and Aromatics in the English Kitchen (1970) Elizabeth David broadly agreed with Jack's recipe, but recommended using white wine vinegar as "less savage". In her Book of Mint (1993) Jackie French concurs with David, but suggests letting the cooked sauce stand for at least a day and preferably a month. Some earlier recipes left the mixture unboiled and did not let it stand. David commented that letting the finished sauce stand was, together with the use of brown sugar, the reason why Jack's sauce was superior to "the routine English one".

== Variations ==
Mint sauces may include fruits in their preparation, such as raspberries.

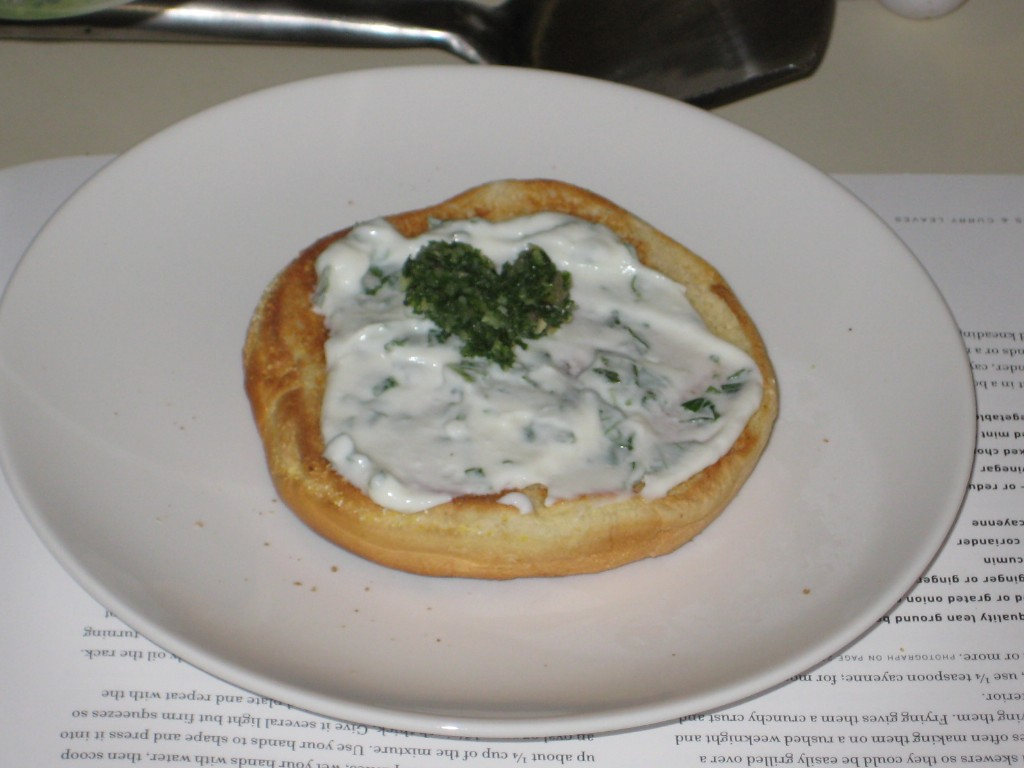
Yogurt-mint sauce

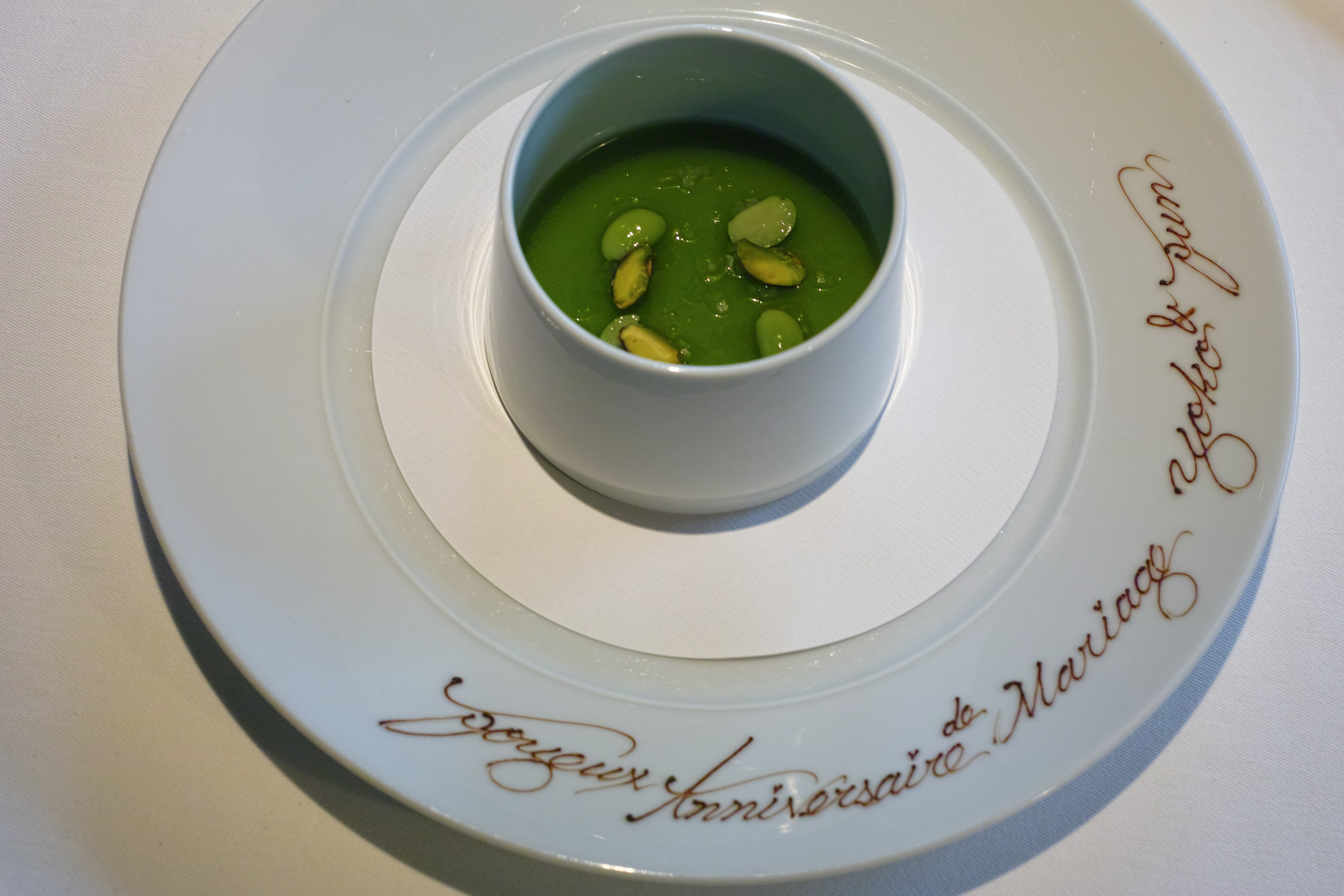
Panna cotta mint sauce

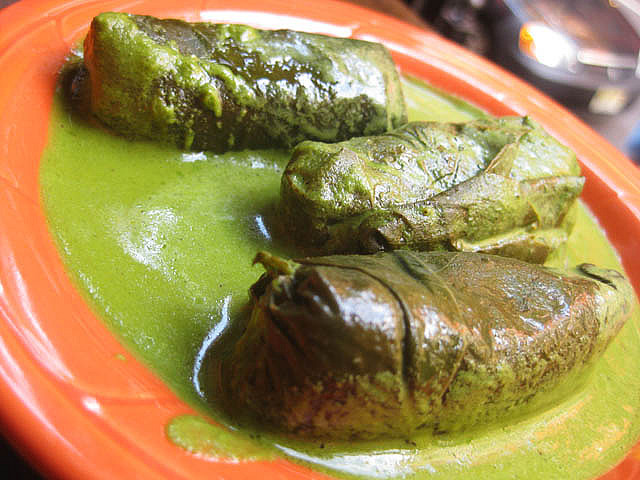
Stuffed grape leaves with yogurt mint sauce

== See also ==
- List of sauces
- Chutney in South Asian cuisine may be made with mint
- Peppermint
- Spearmint
- Mentha aquatica (Water Mint)

== Sources ==
- Albala, Ken (2006). Cooking in Europe, 1250–1650. Westport: Greenwood Publishing Group. ISBN 978-0-313-33096-4.
- Boulestin, Marcel (1936). Myself, My Two Countries. London: Cassell. OCLC 13409111.
- David, Elizabeth (2000) [1970]. Spices, Salt and Aromatics in the English Kitchen. London: Grub Street. ISBN 978-1-902304-66-3.
- Davidson, Alan (1999). The Oxford Companion to Food. Oxford: Oxford University Press. ISBN 978-0-19-211579-9.
- Edwards, John (1984). The Roman Cookery of Apicius: A Treasury of Gourmet Recipes and Herbal Cookery. Point Roberts: Hartley & Marks. ISBN 978-0-88-179008-5.
- French, Jackie (1993). Book of Mint. London: HarperCollins. ISBN 978-0-00-412897-9.
- Glasse, Hannah (1751). The Art of Cookery Made Plain and Easy. London: Hannah Glasse. OCLC 1155400954.
- Hartley, Dorothy (1999) [1954]. Food in England. London: Macdonald and Jane's. ISBN 978-1-85605-497-3.
- Jack, Florence (1914). Cookery for Every Household. London: Jack. OCLC 3248393.
- Redon, Odile; Françoise Sabban; Silvano Serventi (2000). The Medieval Kitchen: Recipes from France and Italy. Chicago: University of Chicago Press. ISBN 978-0-226-70685-6.
- Rosso, Julie (1985). The Silver Palate Good Times Cookbook. New York: Workman. ISBN 978-0-89-480831-9.
- Ude, Louis Eustache (1816). The French Cook; Or, The Art of Cookery Developed in All its Various Branches. London: Ebers. OCLC 1156094380.
