= Peter Clarke Art Centre =

Art school in Cape Town, South Africa

- Frank Joubert Art Centre
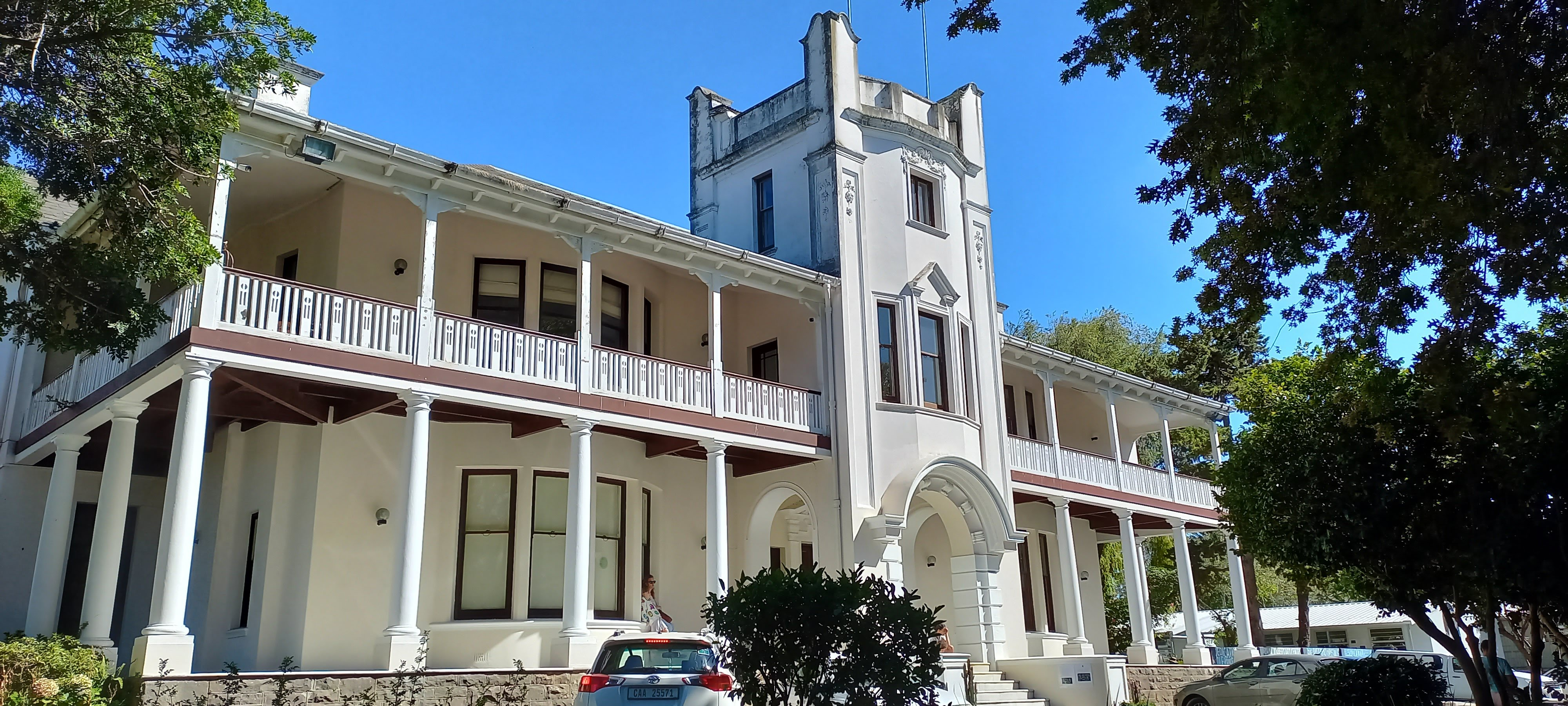
- A view of the Peter Clarke Art Centre's main building Vredenhoff.

Location
- Vredenhof, Keurboom Rd, Newlands; Cape Town, Western Cape, 7708; South Africa; 33°58′26.3″S 18°28′23″E

Information
- School type: Art school
- Established: 1943
- Founder: Captain Frank Joubert
- Staff: 21
- Grades: K - Grade 12 & Adult
- Capacity: 200
- Website: www.pcac.co.za

The Peter Clarke Art Centre, formerly known as the Frank Joubert Art Centre, is a co-educational government art school in Cape Town, South Africa. The school specilises in teaching the visual arts and design within the Western Cape Education Department's curriculum. It has the capacity to offer these courses to 200 grade 10 to 12 students from 50 different schools in the surrounding area. It also offers classes for adult learners.

It was founded by Frank Joubert, a World War II captain in the South African Army, in 1943 to help rehabilitate traumatised soldiers through art. Originally located at Rustenburg House the school moved to its current location at Vredenhoff, Newlands in 1970. In the 1960s the school started offering art as a matric subject to school children from other schools. In 2016 it was renamed after the artist Peter Clarke.
