= Marcel Boulestin =

French chef

Boulestin by Marcel Gromaire (1925)

Xavier Marcel Boulestin (13 April 1877 – 20 September 1943) was a French chef, restaurateur, and the author of cookery books that popularised French cuisine in the English-speaking world.

Born in Poitiers in France (Poitou region), Boulestin tried a number of occupations before finding his role as a restaurateur. He worked as secretary and ghostwriter to the author "Willy" (Henry Gauthier-Villars) in Paris, and then moved to London, where he made his home and career from 1906 onward. There, he opened an interior design shop, which failed to make enough money. He wrote extensively, and was commissioned to write a simple French cookery book for English readers. It was a huge success, and thereafter his career was in cooking.

The restaurant Boulestin, known as the most expensive in London, opened in 1927. Its fame, and the long series of books and articles that Boulestin wrote, made him a celebrity. His cuisine was wide-ranging, embracing not only the French classics but also dishes familiar to British cooks.

Among those influenced by Boulestin was the English food writer Elizabeth David, who praised Boulestin in her books and adopted many of his precepts.

== Life and career ==
=== Early years ===
Born in Poitiers, France, Boulestin was raised by his mother and his maternal grandmother in Poitiers. His parents lived apart, and the young Boulestin spent a month each summer with his father in Saint-Aulaye. He was educated in Poitiers, and later in Bordeaux, where he was nominally a law student, but in practice was a full-time concert-goer and member of the musical scene of the city. He wrote "Letter from Bordeaux" for Courrier Musical, a musical review, and published his first book, a dialogue, Le Pacte, for which the humorous writer Willy (Henry Gauthier-Villars), husband of the novelist Colette, wrote a preface. Despite Willy's endorsement, the book was not a success.

After compulsory military service in 1899, Boulestin moved to Paris and worked for Willy as a secretary and as one of the several ghostwriters he employed for his sensational and well-selling books, among them Curnonsky and Colette. Willy's stories and novels often included characters taken from his friends and collaborators. His Claudine and Minne series and other novels sketched Colette's youth, peppered with characters taken from other spheres, like the clearly homosexual "Hicksem" and "Blackspot", both taken from Boulestin's personality. Willy's novel En Bombe (1904) portrayed his life with Boulestin and his other secretaries, illustrated with 100 posed photos showing Willy himself as Maugis, Marcel Boulestin as Blackspot, another secretary Armory as Kernadeck, Colette as Marcelle, Marcelle as Jeannine, and Colette's dog Toby-Chien. Also, in 1905, Boulestin's French translation of The Happy Hypocrite by Max Beerbohm was published in the Mercure de France, with a caricature of Boulestin by Beerbohm. Boulestin had to convince a sceptical editor that Beerbohm really existed and was not an invention of Boulestin's. He also acted on occasion, alongside Colette, in several plays written by Willy.

=== London and interior design ===
Boulestin was an Anglophile from an early age, even in culinary matters. He attempted to convince his family of the virtues of mint sauce with mutton, bought mince pies and marmalade in Paris, and took Colette to afternoon tea. He moved to London in 1906, and thereafter made his home and career there, though he never considered taking British citizenship (Elizabeth David wrote that he considered it highly improper for a Frenchman to renounce his country). At first, in the words of the biographer Brigid Allen, he immersed himself "in the music-halls and theatres, and the follies and ostentatious luxury of the idle rich". Among his friends were Robert Ross, Lord Alfred Douglas, and Reginald Turner. At first he earned his living by writing humorous "Letters from London" for several magazines, among them Akademos, a sumptuous monthly published by Jacques d'Adelswärd-Fersen. For Akademos, Boulestin also wrote a serial novel with a homosexual theme, Les Fréquentations de Maurice, under the pseudonym "Sidney Place". The book had a succès de scandale in France, but was thought too racy for publication in Britain. (An English translation was finally published in 2024 under the title Maurice In London by Lethe Press.) In the same year he collaborated with Francis Toye, on a lightweight novel, The Swing of the Pendulum. Some of his feuilletons from London were published as Tableaux de Londres in a limited edition (1912). He also wrote for Academy, a review edited by Lord Alfred Douglas; translated plays; and wrote articles that appeared in a variety of publications, including Vanity Fair, Gil Blas, and Mercure Musicale. Boulestin also served as secretary to Cosmo Gordon-Lennox (also known as Cosmo Stuart), a theatrical producer, grandson of the Duke of Richmond and husband of the actress Marie Tempest.

In November 1911 Boulestin opened Decoration Moderne, an interior-design shop at 15 Elizabeth Street in the Belgravia district of London. "My stock was small, but modern and first-rate. I had made no concessions. The silks, the velvets, the linens, the knick-knacks and the wallpapers came from Martine, André Groult, and Iribe. I had bought stuffs at Darmstadt, Munich and Vienna; Berlin and Florence supplied me with certain papers, Paris with new and amusing vases, pottery, porcelain, glass, and a few fine pieces of Negro art". Among his clients were the future interior decorator Syrie Maugham, and socialites such as Lady Curzon and Mrs. Hwfa Williams. His firm also attracted the Countess of Drogheda and Princess Lichnowsky, who had been instrumental in the success of the Omega Workshops.

During the First World War Boulestin served in the French army as an interpreter to the British Expeditionary Force. Among his incidental tasks was designing the costumes for the famous army concert party, the "Rouges et Noirs". He sometimes amused himself at the British headquarters by teaching British soldiers how to cook.

After the war he returned to London and reopened his design business at 102 George Street, Portman Square. It did not prosper. "Perhaps it was a little too advanced—also during those years many shops had started what they called modern decoration; several of the Society women who used to be my customers had themselves become decorators; there was the beginning of the slump, and in addition to all these adverse conditions there were practically no stocks of any kind. Sometimes when there was an important order it could not be executed, the material being out of print, or printed on a cheaper stuff."

During this period Boulestin edited a book of essays and stories, Keepsake, which was illustrated by his friend Jean Émile Laboureur. His income, however, continued to dry up, and he resorted to making extra money through a variety of means, including giving French lessons, making handmade candle-shades, and working as a wine adviser for private individuals. Around 1923, however, Boulestin was contracted to write a French-cookery book by the director of the British publishing house Heinemann; called Simple French Cooking for English Homes, it was published in June 1923 "and was an immediate success with both the Press and the public". In England at that time it was regarded as bad manners to talk about food, but to Boulestin, "Food which is worth eating is worth discussing". This appealed to the public and such were the sales of his book that it was reprinted six times between 1923 and 1930.

=== Restaurateur and writer ===
In 1925, following on the popularity of his cookery books, Boulestin opened The Restaurant Français in Leicester Square in London. The restaurant was the work of the architect Clough Williams-Ellis and the interior decorator Allan Walton. Its chef was M. Bigorre, a Frenchman who had previously worked for Restaurant Paillard in Paris. In 1927 Boulestin moved to Southampton Street, Covent Garden, opening the eponymous Restaurant Boulestin on the site of the old Sherry's Restaurant. The new location featured circus-theme murals by Laboureur and the French artist Marie Laurencin and fabrics by Raoul Dufy. Cecil Beaton called it "the prettiest restaurant in London". The Restaurants of London (1928) described the space—decorated by André Groult—as:

a modern Parisian restaurant in decoration and a luxurious one at that. The carpet is wine colour, the curtains are of patterned yellow brocade; over the mantelpiece is a painting of a dinner table ... the lounge portion of the room is illuminated and decorated by a square of hanging silk balloon lights. In a prominent place is an immense bottle of 1869 liqueur brandy de la maison, a graceful reminder that the place studies drink equally with meat.

The culinary reputation of the establishment was high; the writer Edward Laroque Tinker declared in The New York Times that at Boulestin's "one gets the most perfect and récherché dinner to be found in all London". Boulestin's standards were so exacting that despite being reputedly the most expensive restaurant in London, the Restaurant Boulestin did not make a profit, and he was obliged to supplement his earnings by prolific writing of articles and books. Some of these were written in collaboration with Arthur Henry "Robin" Adair, a British food writer who in 1923 became Boulestin's companion, literary partner and translator.

Among those influenced by Boulestin's writing was Elizabeth David, who after his death emerged as the leading writer in Britain on the subject of food. In her books, she quoted with approval from several of Boulestin's works, including this, originally from What Shall We Have Today?: "The chief thing to remember is that all these soups … must be made with plain water. When made with the addition of stock they lose all character and cease to be what they were intended to be. The fresh pleasant taste is lost owing to the addition of meat stock, and the value of the soup from an economical point of view is also lost." David herself made the same point in many of her writings. She also drew attention to the wide range of Boulestin's culinary tastes. He was not an unswerving advocate of classic French recipes, and wrote with enthusiasm about curries, Basque pipérade, and Irish stew.

Boulestin was the first regular television chef, broadcasting for the BBC in television's earliest experimental days in 1937–1939. In his programmes, including the 1937 Cook's Night Out, he demonstrated not only French dishes such as Escalope de Veau Choisy, Crêpes d'été, and Rouget Marseillaise, but also deceptively simple food including salads, lamb kebabs, spring vegetables, and picnics.

=== Last years ===
In the summer of 1939, Boulestin and Adair were taking their customary holiday in a house that Boulestin had built in the Landes. When France was invaded by Germany, Adair was ill, and unable to escape; Boulestin remained with him. Adair was interned as an enemy alien by the Germans, and held first in Bayonne and then nearer Paris. Boulestin moved to Paris to be close to him, and died there after a brief illness, aged 65.

Adair was released at the end of the war and returned to England, becoming the cookery correspondent of the British magazine Harper's Bazaar. He died in 1956. Boulestin's restaurant continued under various managements until 1994.

== Legacy ==
Joel Kissin launched a cafe and restaurant in London named after Boulestin and his eponymous Covent Garden restaurant in 2013.

== Books ==
- Le Pacte, dialogue (1899). Paris: Société libre des gens de lettres. OCLC 457113383
- Les Fréquentations de Maurice (Mœurs de Londres) (1912) a serial novel written under the pseudonym Sidney Place. Paris: Dorbon-aîné. OCLC 458665120
- Tableaux de Londres (1912). Collection of Boulestin's columns. Paris: Dorbon-aîné. OCLC 35294816
- Dans les Flandres Brittaniques (1916). Wartime memoir. Paris: Dorbon-aîné. OCLC 250247842
- Aspects Sentimentaux du Front Anglais (1916). Published under the pseudonym Bertie Angle. Paris: Dorbon-aîné. OCLC 461914240
- The Atnaeum: A Collection of Atrocities Committed at the Front (1917) Wartime memoir written under the pseudonym Bertie Angle. Privately printed edition of 20 copies. London.
- New keepsake for the year 1921. Le Nouveau keepsake pour l'année 1921. (ed., 1920). London: Chelsea Book Club. OCLC 77593579
- Simple French Cooking for English Homes (1923). London: Heinemann. OCLC 3355941
- A Second Helping: or, More Dishes for English Homes (1925). London: Heinemann. OCLC 558105282
- The Conduct of the Kitchen: How to Keep a Good Table for Sixteen Shillings a Week (1925). London: Heinemann. OCLC 558105222
- Herbs, Salads, and Seasonings (with Jason Hill, 1930). London: Heinemann. OCLC 221892577
- What Shall We Have To-Day? 365 Recipes for All the Days of the Year (1931). London: Heinemann. OCLC 6765535
- Potatoes: One Hundred & One Ways of Cooking (with A. H. Adair, 1932). London: Heinemann. OCLC 17558800
- What Shall We Have to Drink? (1933). London: Heinemann. OCLC 3348186
- The Evening Standard Book of Menus (1935). London: Heinemann. OCLC 20383885
- Savouries and Hors-d'oeuvre: One Hundred & Twenty-Seven Ways of Preparing (with A. H. Adair, 1932) London: Heinemann. OCLC 14360712
- À Londres, Naguère (1930). Paris: Librarie Arthème Fayard. OCLC 9862172 (translated with a new preface by A. H. Adair as Ease and Endurance Home and Van Thal 1948) OCLC 3182708
- Eggs: One Hundred & Twenty Ways of Cooking (with A. H. Adair, 1932) London: Heinemann. OCLC 4695902
- Having Crossed the Channel (1934). London: Heinemann. OCLC 6385901
- Myself, My Two Countries ... (1936). London: Cassell. OCLC 13409111
- The Finer Cooking, or, Dishes for Parties (1937). London: Cassell. OCLC 695840591
- Paris-Londres aux environs de 1900; souvenirs inédits (1945). Paris: Librarie Arthème Fayard. OCLC 31202841
