= Tesselaarsdal =

- Location in the Western Cape
- Coordinates: 34.375°S 19.525°E
- Country: South Africa
- Province: Western Cape
- District: Overberg
- Municipality: Theewaterskloof
- Elevation: 220 m (720 ft)

Population (2011)
  - Total: 1,395
- Postal code: 7230

Tesselaarsdal (formerly Teslaarsdal) is a dispersed rural settlement in the Theewaterskloof Municipality, Western Cape, South Africa. It is situated on the northern side of the Kleinrivier Mountains, 20 kilometres (12 mi) south of the town of Caledon. The 2011 census recorded a population of 1,395 people in 428 households in Tesselaarsdal and on the surrounding farms.

== History ==
The farm Hartebeesterivier was granted in 1781 to Johannes Jacobus Tesselaar as payment for his military service for the Dutch East India Company (VOC). It was one of five loan farms in the Overberg that Tesselaar was to receive. Tesselaar died in 1810 and his farms passed to his widow Aaltje. Following her death in 1832, under the terms of the Tesselaars' joint will, the farm Harteebestrivier was left to nine former servants or slaves and their descendants.

The community now known as Tesselaarsdal developed from these nine original families. Over the years a primary school, a Dutch Reformed Mission church and an Anglican church were established. The name change from Hartebeesterivier to Tesselaarsdal was required when a post office was opened, to avoid confusion with another Hartebeesterivier.

During the apartheid era, some residents were classified as "White" and others as "Coloured". Despite this, the Group Areas Act was never applied to Tesselaarsdal and there were no forced removals. However, white farmers did benefit from agricultural subsidies not available to Coloured farmers.

Ownership of land within the settlement was handled informally, with subdivisions and transfers not registered with government authorities. In 1971 the Caledon Divisional Council approached the Cape Supreme Court to determine legal ownership of the farm, but the case was rejected. In 1982 a committee was established under the Land Titles Adjustment Act to survey the land and give legal title to the de facto owners.

== Notable people ==
- Peter Clarke began his artistic career on a three-month holiday in Tesselaarsdal in 1956.
