= Palazzo dello Strozzino =

Palace in Florence, Italy

Coordinates: 43°46′15.01″N 11°15′9.25″E

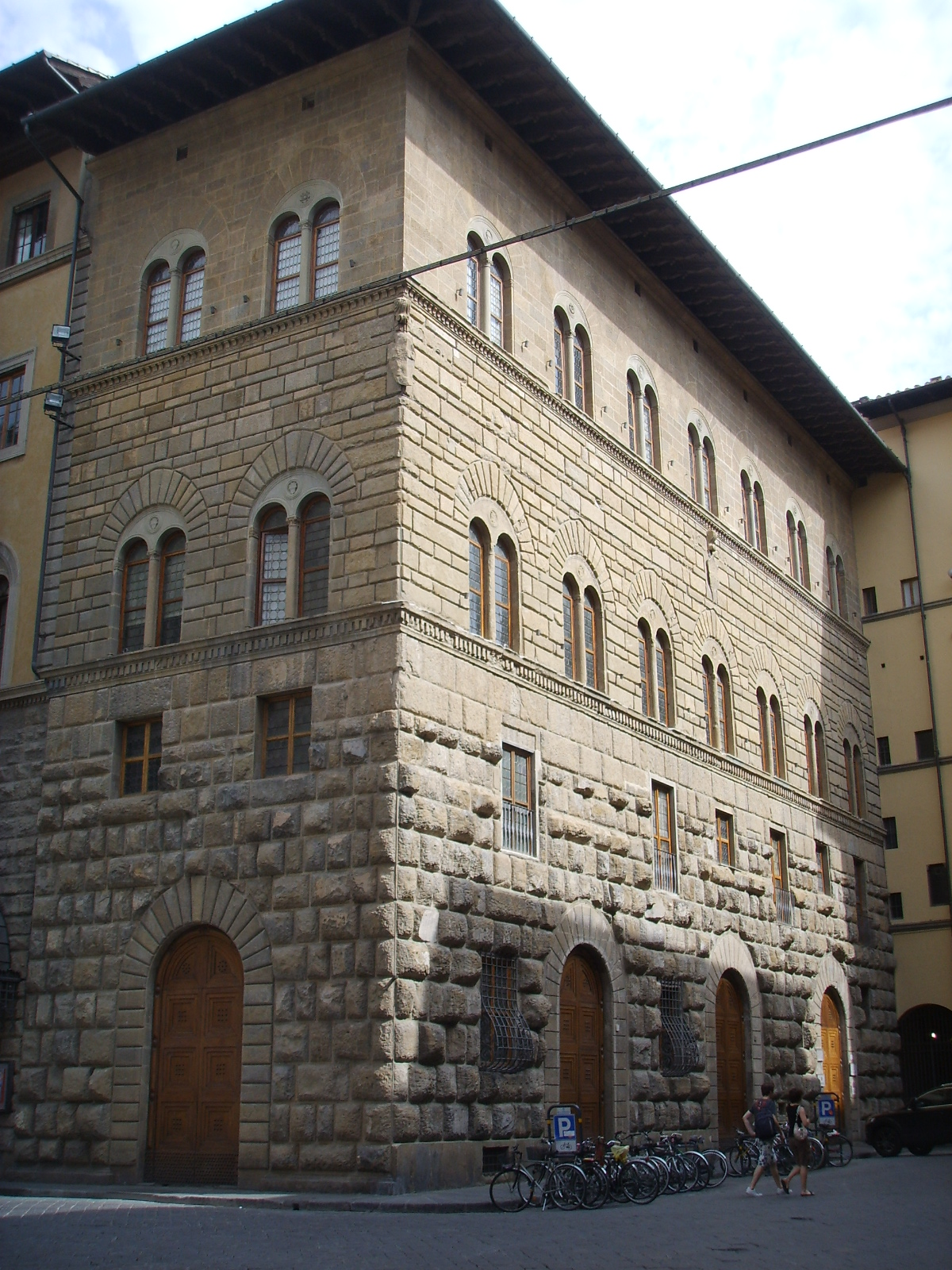
Palazzo dello Strozzino

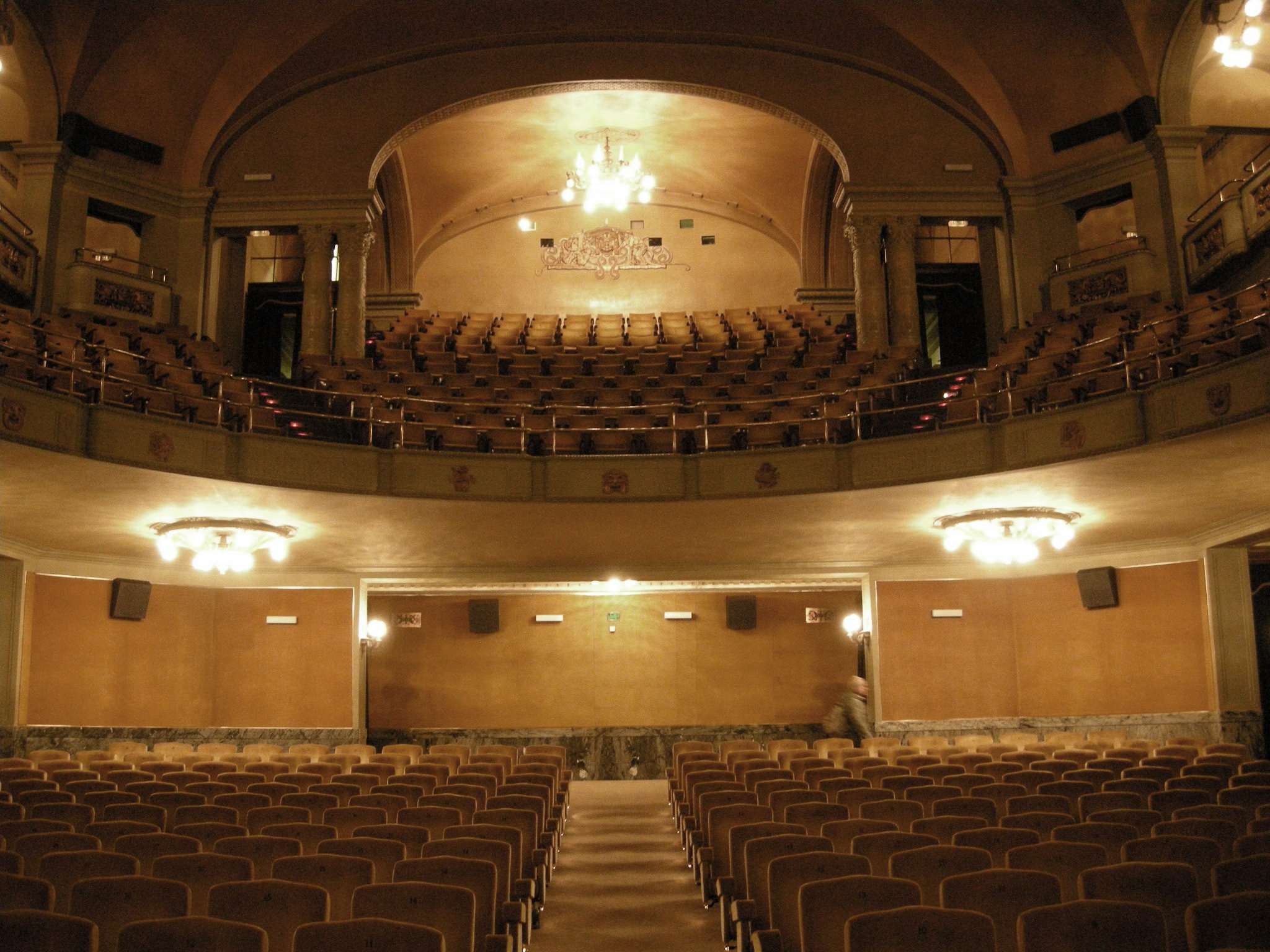
The interior of Cinema Odeon

Palazzo dello Strozzino is a Renaissance palace in Florence, Italy. The stone Renaissance facade is located on Piazza degli Strozzi, diagonal to the Southeast corner of the imposing Palazzo Strozzi. The Northern façade on Via dei Anselmi houses the entrance to the Cinema Odeon.

== History ==
The palace, once known as the Palazzo delle Tre Porte for its three ground doorways, was a residence of the cadet branch of the Strozzi family; it was older and smaller than the grandiose Palazzo Strozzi. The palace houses the Cinema Odeon, designed (1920) by Marcello Piacentini, as well as the language school of the British Institute of Florence.

Built on land owned by Palla Strozzi, it passed to his cousins Agnolo and Palla di Novello after his exile in 1434. They ordered a renovation around 1457, with the design attributed to Filippo Brunelleschi, although other architects participated in the construction, including Michelozzo, to whom the lower façade, featuring an irregular rustication, is attributed. The first floor, which has double mullioned windows and a gentler rustication, is attributed to Giuliano da Maiano (c. 1456). The third floor, with more polished stone, was not added until the 19th century, in a style paralleling similar Renaissance palaces. Michelozzo also designed the internal courtyard (c. 1460), which had a portico with columns. The courtyard was destroyed to accommodate the cinema.

The palazzo was partially demolished in the period when Florence was the capital of Italy (1865). Earlier in the 19th century, as part of the Risanamiento the whole neighborhood was altered. The land in front of the Palazzo Strozzi now occupied by the Palazzo Mattei was once the site of the Piazza delle Cipolle and the church of Santa Maria degli Ughi.

== Sources ==
- Vannucci, Marcello (1995). Splendidi palazzi di Firenze. Florence: Le Lettere. ISBN 88-7166-230-X.
