= Drostdy Museum =

- Location: Swellendam (Overberg District Municipality), South Africa
- Coordinates: 34.01956°S 20.45334°E
- Website: www.drostdymuseum.co.za

Drostdy Museum is located in Swellendam, South Africa. The building was built in 1747 by the Dutch East India Company as a residence for the Magistrate. Soon afterwards, a jail, a house for the secretary, a mill and various outbuildings were erected. It was bought by the South African Government and established as a Museum in 1939.
