= Joan Haslip =

English writer (1912–1994)

Joan Haslip (27 February 1912 – 19 June 1994) was an English writer who wrote several historical books, often focusing on European royalty.

She was born in London and educated in London, Paris, and Florence. Her first book, Out of Focus, appeared in 1931; among her other notable publications are biographies of Lady Hester Stanhope (1934) and Charles Stewart Parnell (1937). In addition, she was a regular journalist for the London Mercury, the Daily Mail, Evening News, and The Illustrated London News. She also worked for the Italian section of the BBC from 1941 to 1944. Her books were generally regarded as accurate and fairly complete, although at times falling prey to "outdated interpretations". Haslip was a Fellow of the Royal Society of Literature.

== List of works ==
- Out of Focus (1931)
- Grandfather's Steps (1932)
- Recipes from Vienna (1933) by Evelyn Bach (introduction)
- Peonies and Magnolias (1934)
- Lady Hester Stanhope (1934)
- Parnell (1937)
- Portrait of Pamela (1940)
- Fairy Tales from the Balkans (1943) illustrated by Dodo Adler
- Lucrezia Borgia (1953)
- The Sultan: The Life of Sultan Abdul Hamid (1958)
- The Lonely Empress: a Biography of Elizabeth of Austria (1965)
- Imperial Adventurer: Emperor Maximilian of Mexico (1971)
  - US edition The Crown of Mexico: Maximilian and his Empress Carlota (1972)
- Catherine the Great (1977)
- The Emperor and the Actress: The Love Story of Emperor Franz Josef & Katharina Schratt (1982)
- Marie Antoinette (1987)
- Madame du Barry (1991)
