= Joel Kissin =

British restaurateur

- Born: New Zealand
- Occupation: Restaurateur
- Known for: D&D London

Joel Kissin, originally from New Zealand, is a restaurateur who was the co-founder, managing director, and shareholder of Conran Restaurants (now D&D London). Kissin has been involved in opening a dozen restaurants in London and New York.

== Restaurants ==
Kissin met Sir Terence Conran in 1986 whilst running the restaurant Hilaire. In 1987, Conran asked Kissin to join Simon Hopkinson, Hilaire's chef, to help launch Bibendum in The Michelin Building. In addition to managing the restaurant and oyster bar, Kissin created an award-winning wine list for the restaurant. After Bibendum, Kissin joined Conran at his new development in Butler's Wharf. Kissin and Conran first created Le Pont de la Tour at Butler's Wharf comprising a restaurant, bar & grill, food shop, wine merchant, oil and spice shop, and bakery.

Kissin and Conran then purchased the Quaglino's site. They also opened Le Pont de la Tour (which hosted a dinner for the Blairs and the Clintons in 1997) and Cantina del Ponte next door before Quaglino's opened on Valentine's Day 1993. The restaurant "broke the mould" in that it was the largest restaurant London had ever known. It seated 350 people, and was fully booked months before opening, remaining that way for many years. The restaurant received critical acclaim and was a leader in terms of turnover and profitability at the time. The restaurant was mentioned in the television series Absolutely Fabulous, as was Le Pont de la Tour.

With the opening of the Butlers Wharf Chop-House in 1994, Kissin and Conran opened three restaurants in a period of 10 months, with a combined turnover of nearly £16 million.

In 1994, Kissin and Conran were jointly awarded a "Catey" as Best Independent Restaurateurs by The Caterer and Hotelkeeper Magazine. The two men continued to open restaurants in London including Mezzo, The Orrery (with chef Chris Galvin), and the Bluebird complex until Kissin left London in late 1997 to open Guastavino's in New York. The Kissin and Conran partnership ended in 2002.

== Property development ==
From 2002 to 2010, Kissin developed residential property in New York City and East Hampton, New York. This included a 6,000 square foot brownstone on the Upper West side, a 2,600 square foot penthouse on Fifth Avenue complete with 2,500 square feet of terraces, and a 11,500 square foot mansion on two landscaped acres in East Hampton.

== Boulestin ==
Noted as 'one of the most influential restaurateurs in Britain', Kissin returned to London to launch Boulestin. Boulestin was named after French restaurateur and television presenter Marcel Boulestin (1877–1943).

The restaurant opened at 5 St James's Street on 2 September 2013, and specialised in classic French cuisine. Within weeks of opening, the restaurant received high praise from food critics. Describing it as "bang on trend," The Guardian's Jay Rayner asserted that "Marcel Boulestin would have loved his namesake restaurant". Writing in the Evening Standard, Fay Maschler singled out the "Oeuf en gelée rendered spectacular by the sunset yolk of a Cotswold Legbar egg," while Guy Dimond of Time Out and A. A. Gill in The Sunday Times praised the daube of beef. Zoe Williams, restaurant critic for The Daily Telegraph, describes the restaurant as "the kind of place that makes you feel like a success; like a person who has gone back to the 1930s, when ceilings were high, fittings were brass and rooms were gorgeous".

Boulestin was sold in February 2018. and closed in 2019.

Kissin was a board member of the Restaurant Association of Great Britain (RAGB) in the 1990s and was also a board member of the New York Chapter of the National Restaurant Association (NRA). He is now an advisory board member of the Restaurant Association division of the BHA in the UK.

== Former projects ==
Restaurants owned, managed or opened by Joel Kissin and Sir Terence Conran:

- Bibendum, Modern British, 1987
- Blueprint Café, Modern British, 1989
- Le Pont de la Tour, Modern European, 1991
- Cantina del Ponte, Mediterranean, 1992
- Quaglino's, Modern European, 1993
- Butlers Wharf Chop House, British, 1993
- Mezzo, Modern European, 1995
- Bluebird, Modern European, 1997
- Zinc Bar and Grill – Opened in 1997
- The Orrery – Modern European – opened in 1997
- Guastavino's New York, American, 2000
