= Irene Cooper Willis =

British literary scholar and barrister (1882–1970)

- Born: 1882
- Died: 1970 (aged 87–88)
- Citizenship: British
- Education: Girton College
- Occupation: Literary scholar Barrister

Irene Cooper Willis (1882 – 1970) was a British literary scholar and barrister.

She was educated at Girton College, Cambridge, where she graduated with a BA in 1904. As a barrister, she was a member of the Inner Temple and Lincoln's Inn.

Willis wrote biographies of Elizabeth Barrett Browning, Florence Nightingale and the Brontës. Her work England's Holy War was originally published in three volumes in 1918, 1919 and 1920 before being published in one volume in 1928. Here, Willis analysed how Liberals, upon the outbreak of the First World War, abandoned their pacifism and supported the war effort with a crusading spirit. William L. Langer called it a "first rate study of national psychology".

In 1911, Willis met Vernon Lee and became the sole beneficiary and executrix of Lee's will after her death in 1935. Two years later, she published privately a selection of Lee's correspondence, titled Letters Home.

Willis was also the executrix of Thomas Hardy's estate after the death of his second wife, Florence, in 1937.

== Works ==
- (editor), Charles James Fox: Speeches During the French Revolution (London: J. M. Dent & Sons, 1924).
- (editor), Charles James Fox: Speeches During the French Revolutionary War Period (London: J. M. Dent & Sons, 1924).
- Montaigne (New York: Knopf, 1927).
- England's Holy War: A Study of English Liberal Idealism During the Great War (New York: Knopf, 1928).
- Elizabeth Barrett Browning (London: Gerald Howe, 1928).
- Florence Nightingale: A Biography for Older Girls (London: G. Allen and Unwin, 1931).
- The Brontës (London: Duckworth, 1933).
- The Authorship of Wuthering Heights (London: Hogarth Press, 1969).
