= Vanity Fair (1939 TV series) =

1939 British TV series

- Presented by: Bettie Cameron Smail
- Country of origin: United Kingdom

Original release
- Release: 1939

Vanity Fair is a British television series which aired during 1939 on the BBC. It was a series about fashion, and was hosted by Bettie Cameron Smail. It aired in a fifteen-minute time-slot.

One episode discussed a wardrobe assembled for £20. Another episode discussed the Paris trends in autumn fashions.

None of the episodes is known to still exist. They aired live, and methods used to record live television did not exist until late 1947, and were used very rarely by the BBC until the mid-1950s.
