= Quaglino's =

Restaurant in London, 1929–1977, 1993–present

Coordinates: 51.5074°N 0.1390°W

- Interactive map of Quaglino's

Restaurant information
- Established: 1929; 97 years ago – original 1993; 33 years ago – revival
- Owners: D&D London (2014–present)
- Location: 16 Bury Street SW1Y, London, United Kingdom
- Website: quaglinos-restaurant.co.uk

Quaglino's (/kwæɡˈliːnoʊz/ kwag-LEE-nohz) is a restaurant in central London which was founded in 1929, closed in 1977, and revived in 1993.

From the 1930s through the 1950s, the original Quaglino's was popular among the British aristocracy, including the royal family, many of whom were regulars, and was a haunt of London's café society. It offered dinner, music and dancing. In the 1960s, it was sold to a succession of hotel companies, and its reputation faded; it closed in 1977.

The name was revived for a new restaurant at the same location in 1993, "aiming to revive the spirit of the original".

== Origins ==
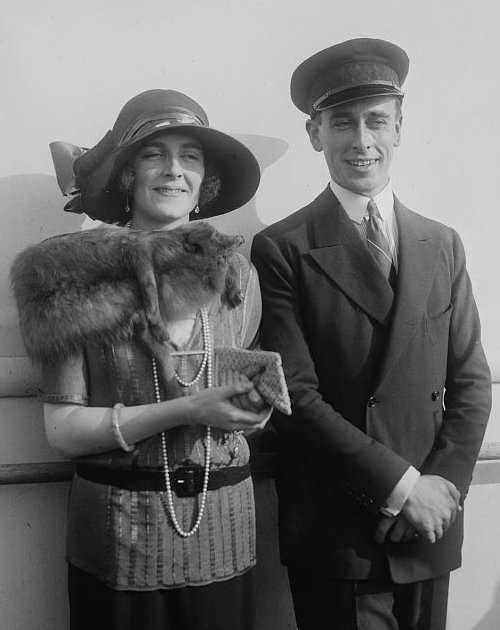
Louis and Edwina Mountbatten, 1920s. The couple were regulars at Quaglino's in the 1930s and 1940s.

Giovanni "John" and his brother Ernesto "Ernest" Quaglino (Italian pronunciation: [kwaʎˈʎiːno]) were immigrants from Piedmont, Italy, probably from Riva presso Chieri or Refrancore, Asti.

John was the maître d'hôtel at the Hôtel Martinez in Cannes, and later worked at The Savoy in London with Giovanni "John" Sovrani. Sovrani left The Savoy to start Sovrani's Restaurant in Jermyn Street in 1927, taking Quaglino with him; however, according to rumour, Sovrani took too much interest in Quaglino's wife, causing him to resign as head waiter in 1929.

John started Quaglino's in the basement of the St. James's Palace Hotel (later the Meurice) on nearby Bury Street, under the patronage of Lady Furness, and with his brother Ernest as headwaiter.

Sovrani's lost much of its business to Quaglino's and closed in 1931. The Tatler reported a rumour on 6 January 1932 in which a restaurant owner was quoted as saying "my boss, he pinch my brother's wife, so now I pinch his business", causing Sovrani to sue the publishers and printers of Tatler for libel. The defence argued that the words could not apply to Sovrani as his restaurant had already closed by the time they appeared and Quaglino's only brother was not married. The jury, however, found in favour of Sovrani and awarded him £2500 damages with costs. Giovanni Sovrani died when the SS Arandora Star carrying around 1500 Italian, Austrian and German internees and enemy aliens to Canada was torpedoed by a German U-boat off the coast of Scotland in July 1940.

== Before WWII ==
Both applied their charm to maximum effect, but it was John who became known as the perfect greeter. It was said that no female visitor could fail to be impressed by the gracious way in which he would present her with a flower as if she was the only person ever to have been so favoured. The epitome of the suave host, he flattered his regulars by name but was neither overly familiar nor obsequious, contriving that fine line – between due deference and professional courtesy that proved irresistible.

Quaglino's became highly fashionable in the 1930s, due in large part to the Quaglinos' charm. It was patronised by the Mountbattens, Evelyn Waugh, Edward, Prince of Wales and Mrs. Simpson, King Alfonso of Spain, King Carol of Romania and the newspaper columnist Charles Graves. Lord Forte recounted that John Quaglino treated royalty "with respect but without fuss", but also made "every guest... feel that he was the only person who mattered", regardless of rank.

Quaglino's offered dining, dancing and cocktails until midnight.

Leslie "Hutch" Hutchinson, one of the first popular black entertainers in Britain, became a regular performer at Quaglino's in the 1930s and 1940s. According to the Sunday People, his affair with Edwina Mountbatten caused her husband Lord Mountbatten to complain to the band leader at Quaglino's that "Hutch has a p***** like a tree-trunk, and he's f****** my wife right now."

In the 1930s, the romantic novelist Barbara Cartland found a real pearl in an oyster served at Quaglino's.

Steak Diane may have been invented at Quaglino's in the 1930s, perhaps by their head chef, Bartolomeo "Meo" Calderoni.

The Quaglino brothers left for Italy in 1940 rather than be interned on the Isle of Man as enemy nationals. They may have been fascist sympathizers. The restaurant was renamed "Meurice" after their departure.

== After WWII ==
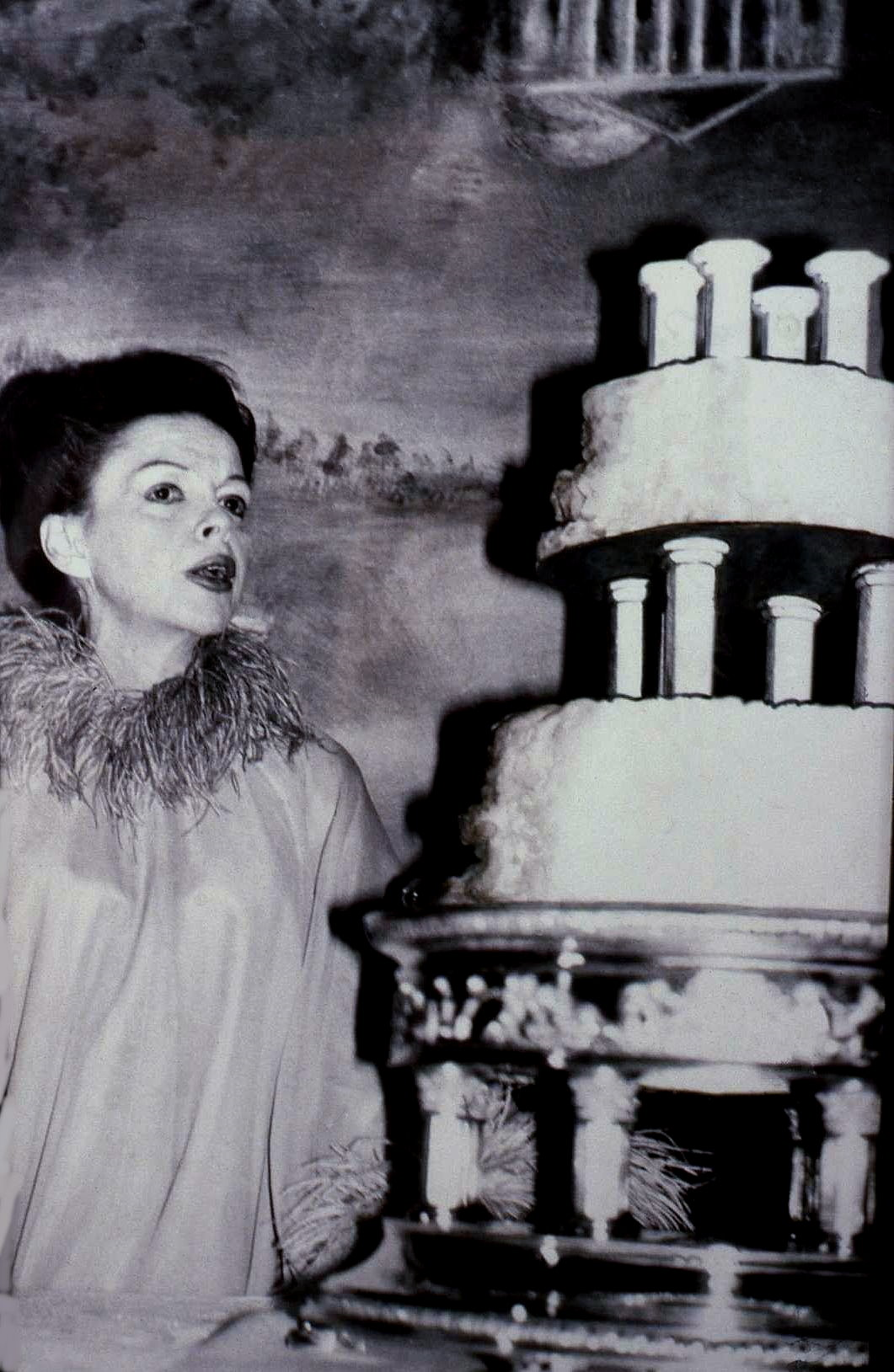
Judy Garland at Quaglino's on her 5th wedding day

The Quaglino brothers returned to England in 1947, with some difficulty, but the restaurant continued to be popular.

In 1947, George Soros was a waiter at Quaglino's.

Queen Elizabeth II dined at Quaglino's in 1956, making her the first reigning British monarch to eat at a public restaurant. The restaurant was said to have a table permanently reserved for the regular visits by Princess Margaret, the Duke and Duchess of Kent and Princess Alexandra.

John Profumo and his wife made a show of togetherness at a dinner-dance at Quaglino's in 1963, after the scandal of the Profumo affair broke.

In March 1969, Judy Garland held the wedding reception for her marriage to Mickey Deans, her fifth, at Quaglino's. The reception was reported to have been poorly attended, with more waiters than guests; even Garland's daughter Liza Minnelli failed to attend, saying "I can't make it Mamma but I promise I'll come to your next one!".

Quaglino's reputation faded in the 1960s, as it was sold to a succession of hotel companies, and it closed in 1977.

== The new Quaglino's, 1993 ==
Terence Conran and Joel Kissin of Conran Restaurants bought the restaurant in 1993 and revived the name, aiming to revive the spirit of the original:

When I walked down that catwalk staircase at Conran's Quaglino's in 1993, I thought here is a kind of London glamour that has been missing since probably 1929 when Giovanni Quaglino launched the original. It wasn't an exercise in nostalgia though; it was a thoroughly modern take culminating in the excitingly impious altar dedicated to worshipping crustacea.

— Fay Maschler

The restaurant became a staple of the BBC television sitcom Absolutely Fabulous.

In 2013, Quaglino's hid a £2000 pearl in an oyster to be served at the restaurant as a publicity stunt based on the incident when Barbara Cartland found a small pearl by accident in the 1930s.

In 2014, the restaurant reopened after a £3 million renovation under the new owners of the Conran Restaurants, D&D London.

In 2018, Quaglino's launched its sustainable menu "Science of Sustainability" featuring sustainably sourced products.

== Chefs ==
Early in his career, starting in 1992, John Torode worked at Quaglino's as a sous chef.
