= Hufsmith =

Hufsmith may refer to:

- Fred Hufsmith (1897–1970), American tenor
- Muriel Hufsmith (1901–1969), American soprano
- Hufsmith, Texas
