= College Rhythm =

1934 film by Norman Taurog

- Directed by: Norman Taurog
- Screenplay by: Walter DeLeon; Francis Martin; John McDermott
- Story by: George Marion, Jr.
- Produced by: Louis D. Lighton
- Starring: Jack Oakie; Mary Brian; Joe Penner
- Cinematography: Ted Tetzlaff; Leo Tover
- Edited by: Edward Dmytryk; LeRoy Stone
- Music by: Tom Satterfield
- Production company: Paramount Pictures
- Distributed by: Paramount Pictures
- Release date: November 23, 1934 (United States)
- Running time: 86 minutes
- Country: United States
- Language: English
- Budget: $537,000

College Rhythm is a 1934 American musical comedy film directed by Norman Taurog and starring Jack Oakie, Mary Brian, and Joe Penner.

The film's budget was $537,000.

== Plot ==
Cocky college football star Francis Finnegan has his eye on the attractive Gloria van Dayham, as does his rival, Larry Stacey.

Francis takes a job in a department store owned by Stacey's father, where salesgirl June Cort is attracted to him. Finnegan proposes that Stacey's store sponsor a football team, which causes rival shop owner Whimple to do the same. The team's head cheerleader Mimi falls for team mascot Joe, and everyone pairs off with the perfect partner after the big game.

== Cast ==
- Jack Oakie as Finnegan
- Joe Penner as Joe
- Lanny Ross as Larry
- Helen Mack as June Cort
- Mary Brian as Gloria
- Lyda Roberti as Mimi
- Franklin Pangborn as Peabody
- Dean Jagger as Coach Robbins
- George Barbier as J. P. Stacey
- Robert McWade as Whimple

== Production ==
Several of the film's cast had appeared in the 1933 hit musical film College Humor. Dorothy Dell had been cast in the leading female role but was killed in an automobile accident on June 8, 1934.

Screenwriter Francis Martin spent four weeks with Joe Penner, a vaudeville and radio star who had no previous experience acting in feature films, before the script had been written. Penner also gave three performances at the Paramount Theatre in New York so that the screenwriters could witness how he performed before a live audience.

Lanny Ross, who had recently signed a 70-week radio contract, continued to be heard on his Maxwell House Show Boat program, the nation's top-rated show, by live remote during the filming of College Rhythm.

Filming took place from mid-August until October 1934. It had originally been scheduled to begin in June 1934 but was delayed repeatedly, including a two-week period just before shooting began in which the film's producers scrambled to find pretty girls with acting talent to fill two roles, which were won by Helen Mack and Mary Brian.

The film's score, with seven new songs, was composed by the songwriting team of Mack Gordon and Harry Revel.

The football scenes were shot at the Rose Bowl and featured the entire USC Trojans football team.

The College Rhythm title was originally intended for the unrelated film She Loves Me Not, but Paramount preserved the other film's original title because of the notoriety of its related novel and stage production.

== Reception ==
In a contemporary review for The New York Times, critic Frank S. Nugent called College Rhythm "a mad and generally merry concoction, unbelievable, nonsensical and designed solely for eye and ear amusement" and wrote: "[T]he plot hangs by less than a thread and the saving grace of the film is its ability to capitalize on the singing talents of Mr. Ross, the charm of Miss Roberti, the handsomeness of Misses Brian and Mack and Mr. Penner's clowning."

== See also ==
- List of American football films
