= The Willow Tree (opera) =

The Willow Tree is an English-language radio opera in one act with music by Charles Wakefield Cadman and a libretto by Nelle Richmond Eberhart. The work tells a tale of slighted love and jealousy in which the romance between Gordon and Donella is broken apart by the arrival of Alison who seduces Gordon. Donella and her father Pietro spy on the cheating Gordon, and Pietro ends up killing him in a confrontation. It was the first American opera specifically created for the radio; although Cesare Sodero's Ombre Russe was the first American opera to be given its premiere on radio in 1929. It premiered on NBC Radio on October 3, 1932, with Sodero conducting the NBC Symphony Orchestra. The premiere cast included Muriel Wilson (Alison), Veronica Wiggins (Donella), Frederick Hufsmith (Gordon), and Theodore Webb (Pietro). The work was later given its stage premiere at the Opera in the Ozarks. The opera lasts approximately 23 minutes.

The critical review in Musical America stated, "Mr. Cadman’s music is in his best style, wonderfully melodious, with real opportunities for the singers to shine in solos and duets—the love duet for tenor and soprano being superbly climaxed—and also vividly dramatic in delineating the tragic denouement. The orchestration is finely wrought."

== Roles ==
- Pietro, a factory owner (baritone)
- Gordon Stanton, Pietro's employee (tenor)
- Donella, Pietro's daughter and Gordon's girlfriend (contralto)
- Alison Travers (soprano)
