= Anne Carver =

Anne or Ann Carver may refer to:

- Anne Carver, character in Arkham Asylum
- Ann Carver, character in Ann Carver's Profession
