= George Frederick Bristow =

American composer (1825–1898)

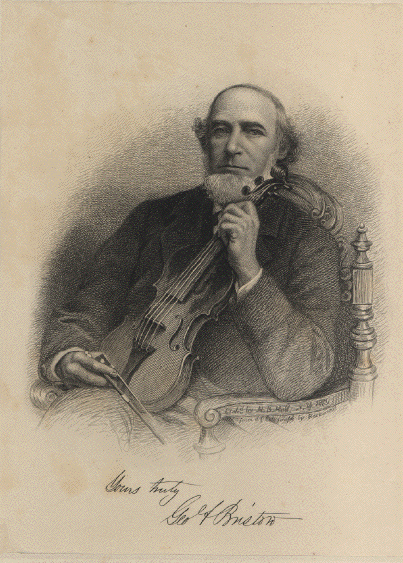
- George Frederick Bristow

Background information
- Born: December 19, 1825; Brooklyn, New York, U.S.
- Died: December 13, 1898 (aged 72) New York City, U.S.
- Genres: Classical; Romantic
- Occupations: Composer; conductor; violinist; music educator
- Instruments: Violin; piano
- Years active: 1840s–1898

George Frederick Bristow (December 19, 1825 – December 13, 1898) was an American composer, conductor, violinist, and educator, born in Brooklyn, New York. A prominent advocate for American classical music during a period of European dominance in U.S. concert life, Bristow worked to promote native composers and establish a national musical identity.

His body of work includes five symphonies, two operas, oratorios, choral pieces, and chamber music. His Fifth Symphony, titled Niagara, premiered at Carnegie Hall in January 1898, only months before his death.

Through his compositions and advocacy, Bristow helped lay the foundation for a distinctly American tradition in classical music. He figured prominently in a public dispute with critic William Henry Fry and the New York Philharmonic Society, criticizing the society's decision to exclude American composers.

== Early life ==
George Frederick Bristow was born on December 19, 1825, in Brooklyn, New York. He was named after German-British composer George Frideric Handel. His father, William Richard Bristow, a composer and music teacher, had emigrated from England to the United States around 1822 with his own father, Thomas Bristow.

The Bristow family settled in Brooklyn, where George was raised in a musically enriched environment. From an early age, he received instruction from his father in piano, harmony, counterpoint, and orchestration.

== Career ==
George F. Bristow was an inaugural member of the New York Philharmonic Society Orchestra, where he began in 1843 in the first violin section, age 17. He remained there until 1879. The New York Philharmonic's records indicate that he was concertmaster between 1850 and 1853.

In the 1850s, Bristow became conductor of two choral organizations, the New York Harmonic Society and the Mendelssohn Union (and later several church choirs); he was also the concertmaster of the touring orchestra for Swedish opera singer Jenny Lind.

In 1854, he began his long career as a music educator in the public schools of New York. One of his notable students was pianist and conductor William Rogers Chapman.

== Music ==
Bristow's compositional output is divided in three periods: his early years, during which most of the compositions are instrumental; the middle period beginning in 1852, during which he wrote more than forty works, several of them lengthy and imposing; and the late period, beginning in 1879 with Bristow's resignation from the New York Philharmonic. Of the 135 compositions listed in Rogers’ dissertation on Bristow's music, one-third are choral or vocal. Seven of his choral works are choral/orchestral pieces, and twenty-seven compositions are smaller pieces, most of which were composed for church choirs that he led. Both the short sacred works and the large choral/orchestral compositions are evenly divided between the middle and late periods.

== Death ==
Bristow died suddenly on December 13, 1898, at the age of 73, while serving as assistant supervisor of music for the Second Public School district of New York City. He collapsed during the school day at Grammar School No. 42. Bristow is buried at Woodlawn Cemetery in the Bronx.

The Public School 134 "George F. Bristow" is named and so is the street in which the school is located: 1330 Bristow Street, the Bronx.

== Works ==
=== Stage works ===
- Rip van Winkle, opera, Op. 22 (1855)
- The King of the Mountains, opera, Op. 80 (libretto by Myron A. Cooney, incomplete, 1894)

=== Vocal works ===
- Eleutheria, cantata (1849)
- Morning Service in E♭ major: Te Deum, Jubilate, Kyrie, Op. 19 (1855)
- Ode, Op. 29 (1856)
- Gloria Patri, Praise to God, oratorio, Op. 31/33 (1860)
- Christ our Passover: an Easter Anthem, Op. 39 (1866)
- The Oratorio of Daniel, Op. 42 (1866)
- The Pioneer, A Grand Cantata, Op. 49 (1872)
- The Great Republic, ode on words by William Oland Bourne, Op. 47 (1879)
- Mass in C major, Op. 57 (1885)

=== Symphonies ===
- Symphony No. 1 in E♭ major, Op. 10 (1848)
- Symphony No. 2 in D minor ("Jullien"), Op. 24 (1856)
- Symphony No. 3 in F♯ minor, Op. 26 (1859)
- Symphony No. 4 in E minor ("Arcadian" or "The Pioneer"), Op. 50 (1872)
- Symphony No. 5 ("Niagara"), for grand orchestra and chorus, Op. 62 (1893)

=== Other orchestral works ===
- Overture in E♭ major, Op. 3 (1845)
- La cracovienne, fantasy for violin and orchestra, Op. 13 (1850)
- Overture to A Winter's Tale, Op. 30 (1866)
- Overture to Columbus (unfinished opera), Op. 32 (1861)
- Overture to Jibbenainosay, Op. 64 (1886)

== Reception ==
From The New York Herald: "As the handiwork of an American composer, The Oratorio of Daniel reflects the highest credit to our country in the realms of art, and there are few, if any, composers in Europe at the present day who are capable of writing anything equal to it."

From The World: "...[Daniel] is by far the most masterly work that an American composer has yet produced, and we judge it will rapidly make its way into the accepted repertory.... That it is a remarkable opus and destined to bring the author's name prominently into the list of those whom we delight to term ‘great living composers’ seems clear enough."

Several reviewers compared the work favorably to Mendelssohn's Elijah. Thirty years later the American Art Journal summed up opinion of this work in Bristow's obituary: "Bristow's oratorio of Daniel is unquestionably one of the most important compositions in this form yet produced by an American composer... From the production of this great work dates a new era in our musical history."

This evaluation gains added significance in light of the large number of popular, well-written works that were produced by Americans during the latter half of the nineteenth century: Horatio Parker's Hora novissima (1892) and Legend of St. Christopher (1897), John Knowles Paine's St. Peter (1872) as well as his Mass in D (1867–68), and Amy Beach's Mass in E-flat (1891).

Bristow's The Oratorio of Daniel has been published in full score form by A-R Editions in its "Recent Researches in American Music" series.

== Discography ==
- Arcadian Symphony ("Arcadian symphonie"): The Pioneer, Op. 49 [i.e. 50]; Royal Philharmonic Orchestra, Karl Krueger, conductor. Society for the Preservation of the American Musical Heritage, MIA 134, 1967. LP record.
- Symphony No. 2, in D minor, Op. 24 ("Jullien"); Royal Philharmonic Orchestra, Karl Krueger, conductor. Society for the Preservation of the American Musical Heritage, MIA 143, 1969. LP record.
- Symphony No. 3 in F♯ minor, Op. 26; Royal Philharmonic Orchestra, Karl Krueger, conductor. Society for the Preservation of the American Musical Heritage, MIA 144, 1969. LP record.
- "Nocturne" and "Scherzo" from Symphony No. 6 in F♯ minor (along with works by Charles Tomlinson Griffes); Royal Philharmonic Orchestra, Karl Krueger, conductor. Society for the Preservation of the American Musical Heritage, MIA 129, 1966. LP record.
- Symphony No. 3 in F♯ minor, Op. 26 (along with Samuel Barber's Symphony No. 2 and Adagio for Strings); Detroit Symphony Orchestra, Neeme Järvi conductor. Chandos, CHAN 9169, 1995. Compact disc.
- Six pieces for organ, Op. 45, No. 1 in F major, No. 4 in G minor, No. 6 in C major on The Nineteenth Century; Janice Beck, organ. Musical Heritage Society, OR A-263, 1970. LP record.
- The Oratorio of Daniel, Op. 42; Keith Kibler, bass-baritone (Daniel); Thomas Paul, bass (Nebuchadnezzar); Beverley Thiele, soprano (Angel); Marguerite Krull, mezzo-soprano (Angel); Steven Tharpe, tenor (Azariah, a Chaldean); Rand Reeves, tenor (Meschach, a Chaldean); Samuel Sommers, bass (Abednego, Arioch, Herald); Catskill Choral Society; Albany Pro Musica; David Griggs-Janower, conductor. Albany Pro Musica, APM-97-1/2, 1997. Compact disc.
- "Praise to God. We praise thee, O God" [Op. 31/33] on Nineteenth century American Sacred Music: From Fuging tune to Oratorio. Various artists. Smithsonian Folkways, FTS 32381, 1980. LP record; reissued Smithsonian Folkways, FTS 32381, 2000. Compact disc.
- Symphony No. 2 in D minor, ("Jullien"), Overture to Rip Van Winkle, Winter's Tale Overture; the Royal Northern Sinfonia, Rebecca Miller, conductor. New World Records, 80768-2, 2015. Compact disc.
- "Dream Land" on The Wind Demon and Other 19th century Piano Music. Ivan Davis, piano. New World Records, NW 257, 1976. LP record; reissued New World Records, 80257-2, 1995. Compact disc.
- Arcadian Symphony CLASSICS OF AMERICAN ROMANTICISM BRIDGE 9572, Bridge Records, The Orchestra Now. Leon Botstein, conductor. George Frederick Bristow, Symphony No. 4, Arcadian. William Henry Fry, Niagara Symphony. 2022. Compact disc and streaming services.

== Productions ==
- Rip Van Winkle (Original, Musical, Comedy), Opera, Music by George F. Bristow; Musical Director: George F. Bristow September 27, 1855 – October 23, 1855
- The Beggar's Opera [Revival, Musical, Drama, Opera], Musical Director: George F. Bristow September 14, 1855 – November 3, 1855
- The Daughter of St. Mark [Original, Musical, Operetta], Musical Director: George F. Bristow June 18, 1855 – June 28, 1855
- The Bohemian Girl [Revival, Musical, Comedy, Opera], Musical Director: George F. Bristow June 2, 1855 – November 3, 1855
- A Queen of a Day [Original, Musical, Comedy, Opera], Musical Director: George F. Bristow June 2, 1855 – November 3, 1855

== Media ==
- Life and Music in the Age of George Frederick Bristow (2026). Documentary film by Eduardo Montes-Bradley. Produced by Heritage Film Project. 60 minutes.

== Sources ==
- George Frederick Bristow at the Internet Broadway Database
- Bristow, George F. (1999). Griggs-Janower, David (ed.). The Oratorio of Daniel : Opus 42. A-R Editions. ISBN 0-89579-443-8.
- Bristow, George F. (2011). Preston, Katherine K (ed.). Symphony No. 2 in D Minor, Op. 24 ("Jullien"). A-R Editions. ISBN 978-0-89579-684-4.
- Dox, Thurston (Winter 1991). "George Frederick Bristow and the New York Public Schools". American Music. 9 (4). University of Illinois Press: 339–352. doi:10.2307/3051685. JSTOR 3051685.
- Griggs-Janower, David (April 1998). "From the Fiery Furnace: Bristow's The Oratorio of Daniel" (PDF). The Choral Journal. XXXVIII (9): 9–21. Archived from the original (PDF) on 2010-06-02.
- Gohari, Carol Elaine (Smith) (Summer 1999). "George Frederick Bristow: Incidental Gleanings". Society for American Music Bulletin. XXV (2). Archived from the original on 2008-05-12.
- Preston, Katherine K. George Frederick Bristow . Urbana, IL: University of Illinois Press, 2020.
- Rogers, Delmer Dalzell (1967). Nineteenth Century Music in New York City as Reflected in the Career of George Frederick Bristow (Ph.D thesis). University of Michigan.
- Struble, John Warthen (1995). The History of American Classical Music. Facts on File, Inc. ISBN 0-8160-2927-X.
