= Ann Carver's Profession =

1933 film

- original film poster
- Directed by: Edward Buzzell
- Written by: Robert Riskin
- Starring: Fay Wray; Gene Raymond; Claire Dodd
- Cinematography: Ted Tetzlaff
- Edited by: Maurice Wright
- Production company: Columbia Pictures
- Distributed by: Columbia Pictures
- Release date: June 9, 1933
- Running time: 68 minutes
- Country: United States
- Language: English

Ann Carver's Profession is a 1933 American pre-Code crime drama film directed by Edward Buzzell. It focuses on the relationship of a female lawyer and her husband, and on the strain that her financial success places on their marriage. The film stars actress Fay Wray and this film was made during the year she cemented her fame in King Kong. Although the writing credits differ, the film bears a striking resemblance in plot to Columbia's 1938 production The Lady Objects starring Lanny Ross and Gloria Stuart.

== Plot ==
Ann Carver and Bill Graham are college sweethearts who graduate, marry, and go to work. There are major differences in their career success. Ann has a law degree, and goes to work at the law firm of retired Judge Bingham. On the other hand, Bill, who in college was a campus football star and voted "Most Popular Man on Campus", lands a low-level job in an architectural firm. She scores a sensational success with her first case (see below) and receives a check for $5000 from her rich client, Harrison. This sets the stage for marital problems, because the very same day that she gets the check for $5000, her husband receives notice of a big raise at work — $10.

Ann quickly becomes a famous and wealthy lawyer, while her husband Bill continues to slog along as a low-level wage slave. The two realize, and discuss, the strain that the disparity in their incomes is placing on the marriage. They resolve to work harder at their marriage, but it immediately becomes clear that the demands of her job will make it difficult for Ann to tear herself from work. There is also a scene in which Ann resents the fact that Bill will not accompany her to a dinner party because he has to go to work. Eventually, disgusted with the paltriness of his income as compared to his wife's success, Bill quits his job as an architect and—in hopes of hitting the big time as a singer—becomes a "crooner" at the Mirador, a friend's nightclub.

While working at the club, Bill begins to drink heavily and becomes involved with alcoholic female singer Carole Rodgers. In a scene at the Mirador, Ann and a group of friends observe Carole giving Bill a kiss. In fury, Ann throws a handful of change at Bill and stalks out. That seals the rupture in their marriage. Ann misses Bill deeply, and becomes distracted and starts to perform badly at work, but when she tries to contact Bill, Bill refuses to talk to her.

Carole loses her job as a result of her drinking and apparently begins spending a lot of time with Bill in his apartment. One evening, while alone in Bill's apartment, Carole gets drunk, passes out, and falls and hits her head on the arm of a couch, which renders her even more unconscious. Her necklace (designed to look like a snake) gets caught on the arm of the couch and she strangles as she is slumped over the side of the couch. Eventually, the necklace slips loose and Carole's body falls to the floor. Much later, Bill comes in, drunk, after work. He sees Carole on the floor, thinks that she is merely drunk and passed-out on the floor, and himself falls into bed.

In the next scene we discover that Bill is on trial, accused of killing Carole. Ann knows that Bill must be innocent, and wants desperately to defend him. Judge Bingham warns Bill that his case looks very bad, but if he will allow Ann to defend him he will at least have the advantage of a passionately motivated defense attorney. Bingham persuades Bill to allow Ann to act as his defense attorney.

The prosecuting attorney's case is built on circumstantial evidence and his depiction of Bill's character. Key to the prosecution's case is its portrayal of Ann as a saintly (beautiful, talented, loving) and wronged wife, and of Bill as a playboy, drunk, and loafer who left his loving wife for a floozie, quit his job to live off of his wife's money, and gave up hard work to live a life of ease as a nightclub crooner.

In her speech to the jury, Ann first points out that it is highly unlikely that Bill killed Carole—he had no motive for killing her. Then, from personal knowledge, she contests the prosecution's depictions of her as the saintly wronged party. Instead, she says, Bill was the wronged party. She had been obsessed over money and fame and drove him away. She deeply regrets it, she says, and hopes that in this—the last trial of her career—she can convince the jury of Bill's innocence. In the last scene of the movie, we see Ann and Bill at home together, a happily married couple living in a nice house. We see that Bill has been acquitted, Ann has given up her career, and Bill has become a successful architect with projects showcased in Vanity Fair and House and Garden.

== Cast ==
- Fay Wray as Ann Carver Graham
- Gene Raymond as William "Lightning Bill" Graham
- Claire Dodd as Carole Rodgers
- Arthur Pierson as Ken Bingham
- Claude Gillingwater as Judge Bingham
- Frank Albertson as Jim Thompson
- Frank Conroy as Baker
- Jessie Ralph as Terry (Graham's maid)
- Robert Barrat as Attorney Andrew Simmons
