= Sebastian Bach Mills =

English pianist and composer (1839–1898)

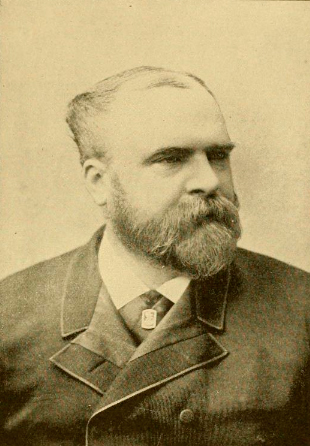

Sebastian Bach Mills (13 March 1839 – 21 December 1898) was an English pianist, composer and piano instructor who made his concert career in the United States and gave the first American performances of many important works.

== Biography ==
Born in Cirencester, Gloucestershire, Mills received his earliest instruction from his father, who was organist at Gloucester Cathedral. The father was a great admirer of Johann Sebastian Bach, hence the name he gave his firstborn son. In adulthood, Mills simply signed himself "S.B. Mills." In spite of the name and his father's vocation, Mills chose piano over the organ. His precocious talent brought him to the attention of the French light music composer Louis-Antoine Jullien, who engaged the "infant prodigy" for his earliest concert performances.

Young Mills played at Drury Lane Theatre in London in 1846 at the age of six, performing Czerny’s Rondo Brillant on Themes from Preciosa and gave a command performance before Queen Victoria at age seven. He studied in England with Cipriani Potter and William Sterndale Bennett and at the Leipzig Conservatory with Louis Plaidy, Carl Czerny, Ignaz Moscheles, Julius Rietz and Moritz Hauptmann. At Leipzig, he met his future wife, Antonia Young, a native of Germany whose family had emigrated to Chicago.

He went to America in 1856 and, after some disappointing initial receptions, was engaged by New York Philharmonic Society music director Carl Bergmann to perform the Schumann Piano Concerto in A minor. Its favorable reception before a largely German-speaking crowd let Bergmann to re-engage Mills for other performances, and the pianist appeared annually with the Philharmonic Society from 1859 to 1877. He also made tours of Germany in 1859, 1867 and 1878. A personal friend of William Steinway, he performed exclusively on Steinway pianos.

Mills retired from active concertizing in 1880 – coincident with the arrival in New York of pianist Rafael Joseffy, who was more often engaged by the New York Philharmonic's new music director, Theodore Thomas to play Mills' repertoire – and he subsequently devoted himself to teaching. Suffering from failing health in his latter years, he moved to Germany at his wife's insistence in April 1898 and died in Wiesbaden on December 21. One of his notable students was pianist and conductor William Rogers Chapman.

== American premieres given ==
These are the earliest known U.S. performances of the works listed unless otherwise noted.

- Hans von Bronsart (1830–1913) – Piano Concerto in F♯, New York Philharmonic Society, Leopold Damrosch, February 17, 1877
- Frédéric Chopin (1810–1849) – Piano Concerto No. 2 in F minor, New York Philharmonic Society, Carl Bergmann, November 9, 1861
- Ferdinand Hiller (1811–1885) – Piano Concerto in F♯ minor, New York Philharmonic Society, Carl Bergmann, November 7, 1863
- Franz Liszt (1811–1886) – Piano Concerto No. 1 in E♭, Thomas Symphony Soiree Orchestra, Theodore Thomas, December 2, 1865
- Franz Liszt (1811–1886) – Piano Concerto No. 2 in A, New York Philharmonic Society, Carl Bergmann, November 26, 1870 (New York premiere one month after U.S. premiere)
- Wolfgang Amadeus Mozart (1756–1791) – Piano Concerto No. 25 in C, New York Philharmonic Society, Carl Bergmann, November 4, 1865
- Wolfgang Amadeus Mozart (1756–1791) – Piano Concerto No. 10 (for Two Pianos) in E♭, Thomas Symphony Soiree Orchestra, Theodore Thomas, February 10, 1866 (with pianist William Mason)
- Joseph Joachim Raff (1822–1882) – Suite for Piano and Orchestra, New York Philharmonic Society, Theodore Thomas, November 24, 1877
- Carl Reinecke (1824–1910) – Piano Concerto in F♯ minor, New York Philharmonic Society, Carl Bergmann, January 6, 1872
- Robert Schumann (1810–1856) – Piano Concerto in A minor, New York Philharmonic Society, Carl Bergmann, March 26, 1859
- Carl Maria von Weber (1786–1826) – Polonaise in E for Piano and Orchestra (arr. Liszt), New York Philharmonic Society, Carl Bergmann, November 5, 1864

== Compositions ==
- Three Tarantelles (1863, 1865, and 1888)
- Murmuring Fountain (1865)
- Polonaise (1866)
- Fairy Fingers (1867)
- Recollections of Home (1867)
- Waltz Impromptu (1873)
- Saltarello (1874)
- Two Études de Concert (1880)
