= William H. Rieger =

American concert tenor and recitalist

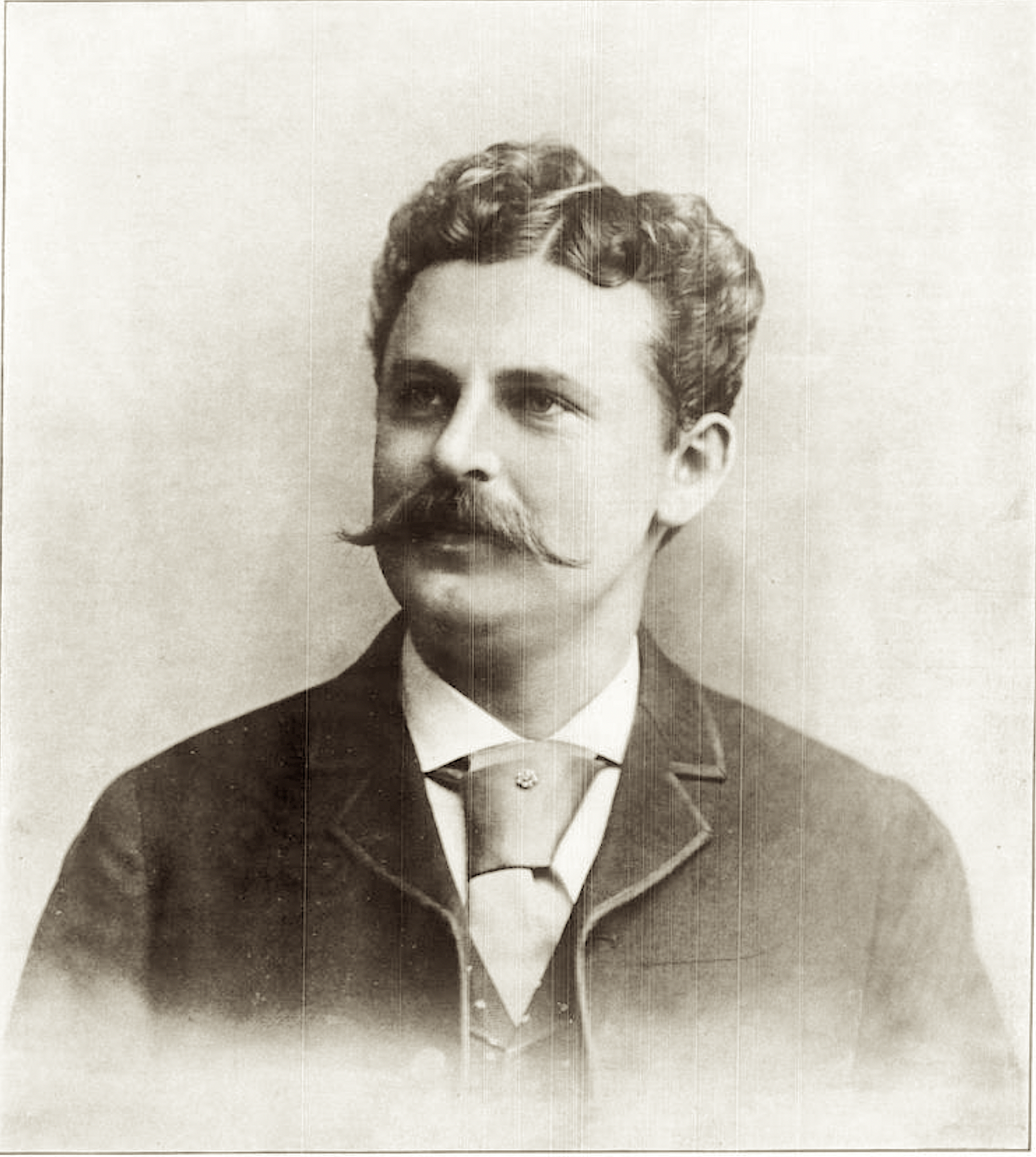
William H. Rieger on the front cover of The Musical Courier, November 4, 1896

William Henry Rieger (March 22, 1862 – January 26, 1930) was an American concert tenor and recitalist who was considered a specialist in the oratorio repertoire. A native of New York City, he began his career as a church vocalist in the 1880s. In 1887–1888, he toured as a member of Dockstader's Minstrels, a blackface minstrel show. After this, he became a prominent concert tenor on the American stage in the 1890s and into the early 20th century, performing as a soloist with the New York Philharmonic, the Boston Symphony Orchestra, and the Chicago Symphony Orchestra among other organizations. On rare occasions, Rieger performed opera repertoire, but largely eschewed this work, turning down an opera contract with Abbey, Schoeffel and Grau of Metropolitan Opera fame.

In the 1910s, he mostly stopped performing but continued to work as a church singer. He devoted the remainder of his career to work as a voice teacher in New York. One of his better-known students was soprano Muriel Wilson. Rieger died at the age of 67 in 1930.

== Early life and education ==
The son of Louis Rieger and Anna Rieger (née Beck), William Henry Rieger was born in New York City on March 22, 1862. He was educated in New York City Public Schools, and had his earliest training as a singer as a boy soprano in the choir of St. John's Chapel. As a young adult he attended the National Conservatory of Music of America. In April 1886 he gave a student recital at Chickering Hall.

== Early career ==
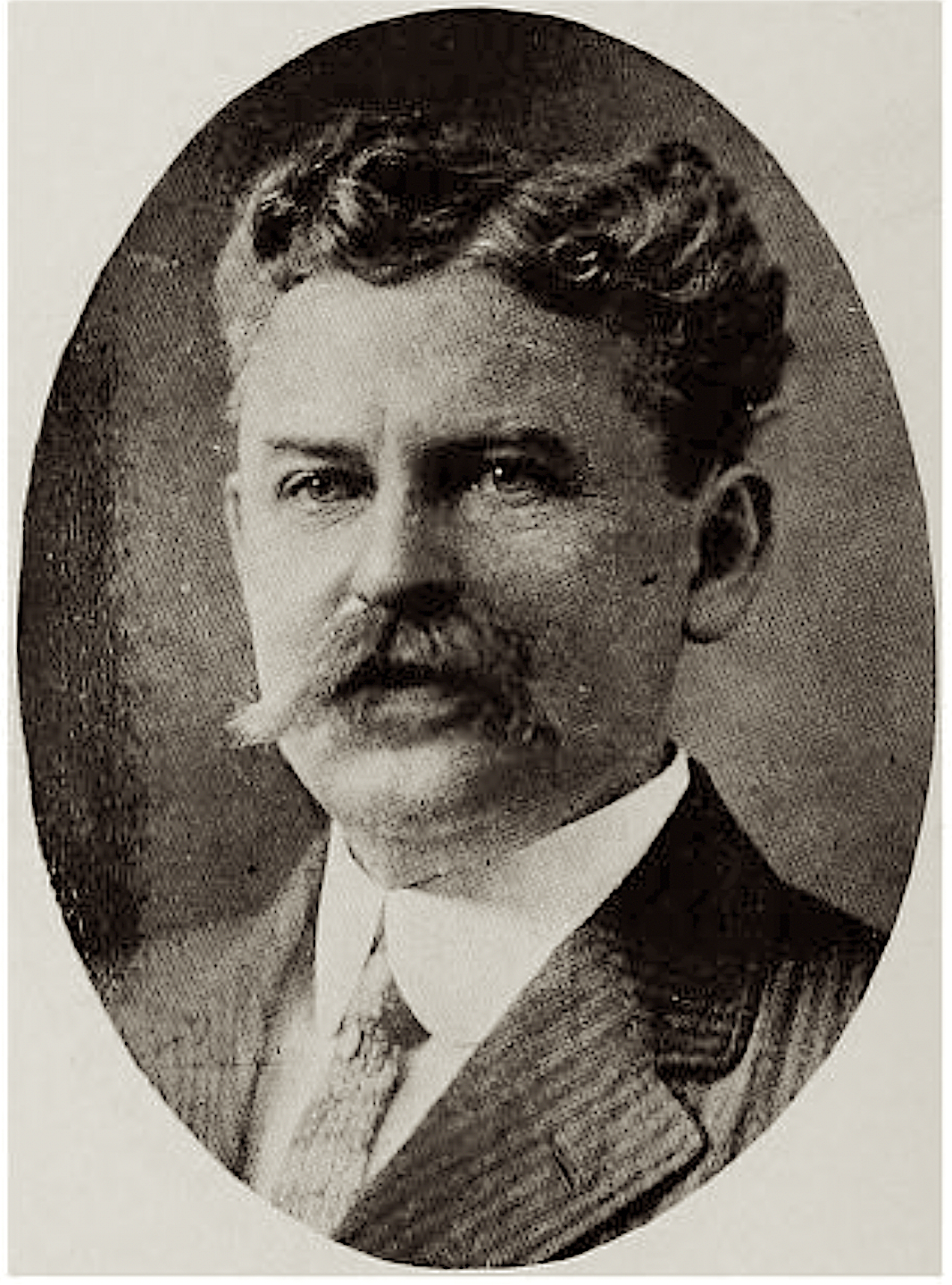
William H. Rieger in 1914

Rieger began his career in the 1880s as a church vocalist on the music staff of the Church of the Covenant (COC) in Manhattan. He was a performer in a touring blackface minstrel show, Dockstader's Minstrels, in 1887–1888, performing as a tenor in an all-male vocal quartet. In 1889 he became a member of composer and conductor Louis R. Dressler's Schumann Male Quartette. In November 1889 he was a soloist in Franz Liszt's Christus with the Oratorio Society of New York led by Walter Damrosch at the Metropolitan Opera House ("Met"). He rapidly became a leading oratorio singer in New York, and by 1891 had sung the lead tenor solos in NYC performances of Giuseppe Verdi's Requiem, Handel's Judas Maccabaeus, Handel's Samson, Haydn's The Creation, Haydn's The Seasons, and Rossini's Stabat Mater among other works.

In March 1890 Rieger was a soloist in Charles Gounod's La rédemption at the Brooklyn Academy of Music with conductor Theodore Thomas leading the musical forces. The following May he was a soloist with the Washington Choral Society in The Light of Asia in a performance conducted by its composer, Dudley Buck, at Lincoln Music Hall. On April 12, 1890, he was the tenor soloist in Ludwig van Beethoven's Symphony No. 9 with the New York Philharmonic (NYP) and the Metropolitan Musical Society chorus at the Metropolitan Opera House. He later performed as soloist in that symphony again with the NYP at Carnegie Hall in April 1900.

By 1891 Rieger had left his church post at the COC to join the vocal music staff of Madison Avenue Reformed Church where he worked under conductor and organist William Rogers Chapman during the 1890s. He maintained a busy schedule as a concert tenor on the national stage in the 1890s. In September 1892 he was a soloist in Mendelssohn's Lobgesang with conductor Carl Zerrahn at the Worcester Music Festival. In April 1892 he was a soloist in Johann Sebastian Bach's St Matthew Passion with the Bach Choir of Bethlehem. In December 1892 he was a soloist in George Frideric Handel's Messiah with first the Apollo Chorus of Chicago and again in Boston with conductor Franz Kneisel, the Boston Symphony Orchestra (BSO), and the Handel and Haydn Society (HHS) chorus. He later performed again with the BSO and HHS as a soloist in Horatio Parker's Hora Novissima, Op. 30 at Boston Music Hall with Parker conducting on February 4, 1894, and as a soloist in Bach's St Matthew Passion on March 28, 1902.

While not usually employed to sing opera, Rieger did occasionally perform in this genre, most often in concert format. In December 1891 he performed Tamino's arias from Mozart's The Magic Flute with the NYP. He appeared in his first staged opera, a production of Acis and Galatea, at New York City's Handel Festival as Acis opposite Clementine de Vere Sapio as Galatea with conductor Walter Damrosch in April 1892. He was later offered an opera contract by Abbey, Schoeffel and Grau (former leaders of the Metropolitan Opera), but declined in favor of remaining a concert tenor. The Musical Courier featured Rieger on the front cover of its November 4, 1896, edition. The magazine stated the following at that time:

In the ranks of America's singers no name stands forth with more distinguished prominence and favor than that of the tenor, William H. Rieger. An artist of superb voice, rare musical intelligence, abundant feeling and dramatic power, William H. Rieger was from the very date of his début greeted and widely acknowledged as a leading tenor of his period in concert and oratorio in America. He was exactly the singer of whom the public stood in need, rich-voiced, commanding a large repertory, and always reliable. For these valuable reasons, extremely difficult to meet combined, Mr. Rieger has succeeded in holding with prominent success his position of concert and oratorio tenor in America longer than any other tenor who can be remembered.

In January 1895 Rieger performed the role of Arthur Dimmesdale in the world premiere of Walter Damrosch's opera The Scarlet Letter which was presented in a concert version with Lillian Nordica as Hester Prynne. In February of that year he performed in the Chicago premiere of Max Bruch's Arminius. In May 1895 Rieger was a soloist in a program of all Wagner music with Nordica at the Indianapolis May Festival, He was the tenor soloist in John Knowles Paine's oratorio Oedipus Tyrannus, Op. 35 with the composer conducting the Apollo Club at Boston Music Hall on November 26, 1895. In January 1896 he performed the title role in Berlioz's La Damnation de Faust with the Chicago Symphony Orchestra. He 1897 he was a soloist in Handel's Messiah with the Pittsburgh Symphony Orchestra at Carnegie Music Hall. In 1898 he was the tenor soloist in Antonín Dvořák's The Spectre's Bride with the Choral Society of Washington.

== Later life and career ==
In 1900 Rieger was a soloist in Michael Costa's Naaman with conductor Samuel Winkley Cole leading the Boston Festival Orchestra and The People's Choral Union of Boston. In April 1901 he performed the role of Samson in a concert version of Camille Saint-Saëns's Samson and Delilah with Ernestine Schumann-Heink as Delilah, the BSO, the Boston Cecilia, and conductor Benjamin Johnson Lang. On May 1901 he portrayed the parts of Obadiah and Ahab in a staged version of Felix Mendelssohn's Elijah at the Hyperion Theater in New Haven, Connecticut. In 1903 he performed again with the Bach Choir of Bethlehem as a soloist in the cantata Ich will den Kreuzstab gerne tragen, BWV 56.

In 1904 Rieger returned to work as a touring minstrel show performer as a member of Primrose's Minstrels. In 1905 he was a soloist in a concert at Carnegie Hall honoring the centennial of Friedrich Schiller's death. By that time he had begun working as a voice teacher in New York City. In 1906 he was the Evangelist in the St Matthew Passion with the Bach Choir of Baltimore, a role he repeated in Milwaukee the following year.

In the 1910s Rieger was employed as a resident tenor at West-Park Presbyterian Church. At this point he performed rarely outside of church work and devoted most of his time to teaching singing. His notable pupils included Metropolitan Opera bass-baritone Frederick Gunther and soprano Muriel Wilson.

Rieger died at his home in New York City on January 26, 1930, at the age of 67.
