= The Lady Objects =

1938 film by Erle C. Kenton

- Directed by: Erle C. Kenton
- Screenplay by: Gladys Lehman; Charles Kenyon
- Produced by: William Perlberg
- Starring: Lanny Ross; Gloria Stuart; Joan Marsh
- Cinematography: Allen G. Siegler
- Edited by: Al Clark
- Music by: Morris Stoloff
- Production company: Columbia Pictures
- Distributed by: Columbia Pictures
- Release date: October 12, 1938
- Running time: 66 minutes
- Country: United States
- Language: English

The Lady Objects is a 1938 American drama film written by Gladys Lehman and Charles Kenyon and directed by Erle C. Kenton. It was nominated for the Oscar for Best Song at the 11th Academy Awards with the song A Mist Is Over the Moon, with music by Ben Oakland and lyric by Oscar Hammerstein II. Although the writing credits differ, this film bears a striking resemblance to Columbia's 1933 film, Ann Carver's Profession.

== Plot ==
Bill Hayward's years as a college athlete and singer are behind him, and while he struggles financially, his attorney wife Ann is prospering, promoted to junior partner in her law firm.

While she's in Washington, D.C., on business, Bill accompanies friends June and George to a New York City nightclub where they have been hired to entertain. He is persuaded to get on stage and sing himself, but resists the temptation to get into a romantic situation with June, a former girlfriend from their school days.

June gets inebriated and a mishap results in her accidental death. Bill, however, is charged with her murder. Ann offers to defend him in court, but Bill can't bear that thought. When the case goes badly against him, however, Ann volunteers information that results in Bill's acquittal and their reconciliation.

== Cast ==
- Lanny Ross as William Hayward
- Gloria Stuart as Ann Adams Hayward
- Joan Marsh as June Lane
- Roy Benson as George Martin
- Pierre Watkin as Mr. Harper
- Robert Paige as Ken Harper
- Arthur Loft as Charles Clarke
- Stanley Andrews as Baker
- Jane Buckingham as Mrs. Harper (Jan Buckingham)
- Bess Flowers as Miriam Harper
- Ann Doran as Miss Hollins
- Vesey O'Davoren as Langham
