= William Rogers Chapman =

American organist, music teacher, and conductor (1855–1935)

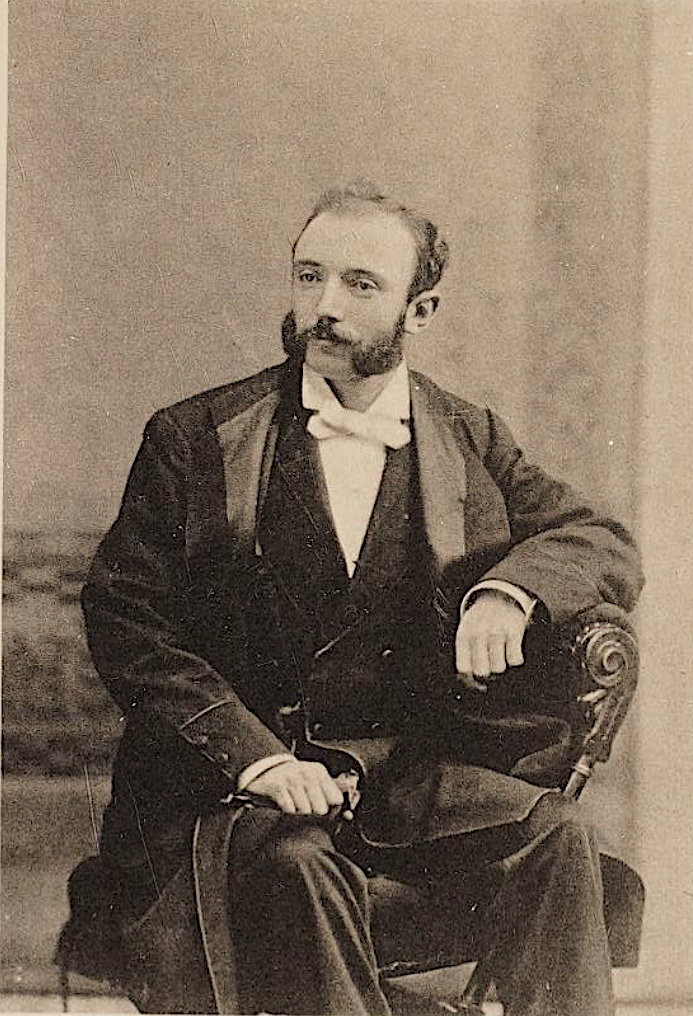
- Chapman in 1877 and then on his wedding day
- Born: August 4, 1855; Hanover, Massachusetts, United States
- Died: March 27, 1935 (aged 79); Palm Beach, Florida, United States
- Education: American Conservatory of Music
- Occupations: Conductor; organist; pianist; composer; music educator
- Known for: founder and director of: Musurgia Choral Society; Rubinstein Club; Metropolitan Musical Society; Maine Music Festival

William Rogers Chapman (August 4, 1855 – March 27, 1935) was an American conductor, organist, pianist, composer, and music educator. He is best known as the founding director of two choruses in New York City (the men's chorus Musurgia Society and the women's chorus the Rubinstein Club), and for establishing the Maine Music Festival. He led the latter organization for 30 years. A third New York City chorus he established, a mixed ensemble called the Metropolitan Musical Society, was largely made up of singers from the other two choirs. His choirs frequently collaborated with the New York Philharmonic. At the time of death in 1935, the Associated Press stated that he was known as "the father of good music in Maine".

== Early life and education ==
William Rogers Chapman was born August 4, 1855, in Hanover, Massachusetts. He was named after his father, the Reverend William Rogers Chapman, who died not long after his birth on October 25, 1855, at the age of 43. Chapman was christened on top of his father's coffin when he was three months old. He grew up in Bethel, Maine, where he was raised by his mother, Emily Irene Bishop Chapman. He was educated at Gould Academy in Bethel.

In 1868 William's mother married a second time, to William Jacob Valentine, a New York banker, and the family moved to Fordham, New York. Soon after William was sent to a school in New York City operated by the Collegiate Reformed Protestant Dutch Church with the aim of being trained as a minister. At the age of 14 he was sticken with sudden blindness and spent a year recuperating with bandaged eyes in a darkened room. During this time he began playing a piano in the room he was sequestered in, and developed a noticeable gift. His path was subsequently re-oriented toward music, and he began piano studies in New York with Sebastian Bach Mills. Other music teachers he studied under in New York City included William Mason (chamber music), George F. Bristow (harmony), and Henry Stephen Cutler (organ).

Chapman subsequently studied piano with Charles Fradel at the American Conservatory of Music (ACM) where he initially enrolled in 1872. His sister Minnie was also trained as a pianist at that conservatory, and had begun her studies there in 1871. In the summer of 1875 he was sent to Europe by his family for further training in Leipzig and Berlin. He traveled by ship first to England where he met with George Alexander Macfarren who advised him that he could progress as a musician just as easily in the United States as in Europe. During his visit to Germany he performed for Franz Liszt who sent a letter to Chapman's mother praising his talent. Heeding Macfarren's advice, Chapman returned to New York earlier that his mother intended as she had wished him to complete a conservatory education in Germany. He completed his music studies at the ACM from which he graduated in 1875. He later studied music theory, music composition, and conducting privately with Anton Seidl who became a close friend and colleague.

== Organist, school teacher, and marriage ==
In the fall of 1871 Chapman began working as an organist in Mamaroneck, Long Island, in a church led by Reverend Thomas R. Slicer. Soon after he began performing as a concert pianist in the New York City region in concerts that often featured his own original compositions. By 1875 he had left his post in Mamaroneck for a position as organist at St. Paul's Reformed Church in Mott Haven. When he left America for Europe his sister took over his organist duties there. After completing his education at the AMC, he joined the faculty of the New York Conservatory of Music at its Brooklyn campus in 1875. He taught there until his resignation in July 1877. In the 1875-1876 season he appeared a soloist with the New York Philharmonic (NYP), performing Liszt's Hungarian Rhapsodies under Theodore Thomas.

In 1875 Chapman met his future wife, Emma Louise Faulkner, a young woman visiting New York from Chicago who had graduated from Dearborn Seminary and was studying to be a classical vocalist under Frederic Woodman Root. Emma's uncle, Brooklyn Union editor Henry M. Smith, was a cousin of Chapman's mother, and Emily had known Emma's mother years earlier when they were both young. The pair formed a romantic attachment. Emily returned to Chicago, but they wrote more than 100 love letters to each other in the twenty months following their meeting in New York. They married on July 19, 1877, at First Presbyterian Church in Chicago. Among the couple's social circle in New York was Mark Twain.

In 1876 Chapman became a music teacher with New York City Public Schools (NYCPS), and his work for NYCPS including simultaneous teaching responsibilities within thirteen different schools. He resigned from his position with NYCPS in 1886. While teaching he continued to be employed as an organist concurrently at churches in Mott Haven and Manhattan. In 1877 he was appointed organist and choirmaster at the Church of the Covenant in Manhattan. He remained in this post for 13 years during which time he led annual Thanksgiving Day performances of Handel's Messiah at the church with a full orchestra. In c. 1890 he resigned from the Church of the Covenant following a reorganization within the presbytery in 1889 which had led to internal conflicts within the church.

In 1890 Chapman was appointed organist at Madison Avenue Reformed Church. His mother died in January of that year.

== Conductor ==
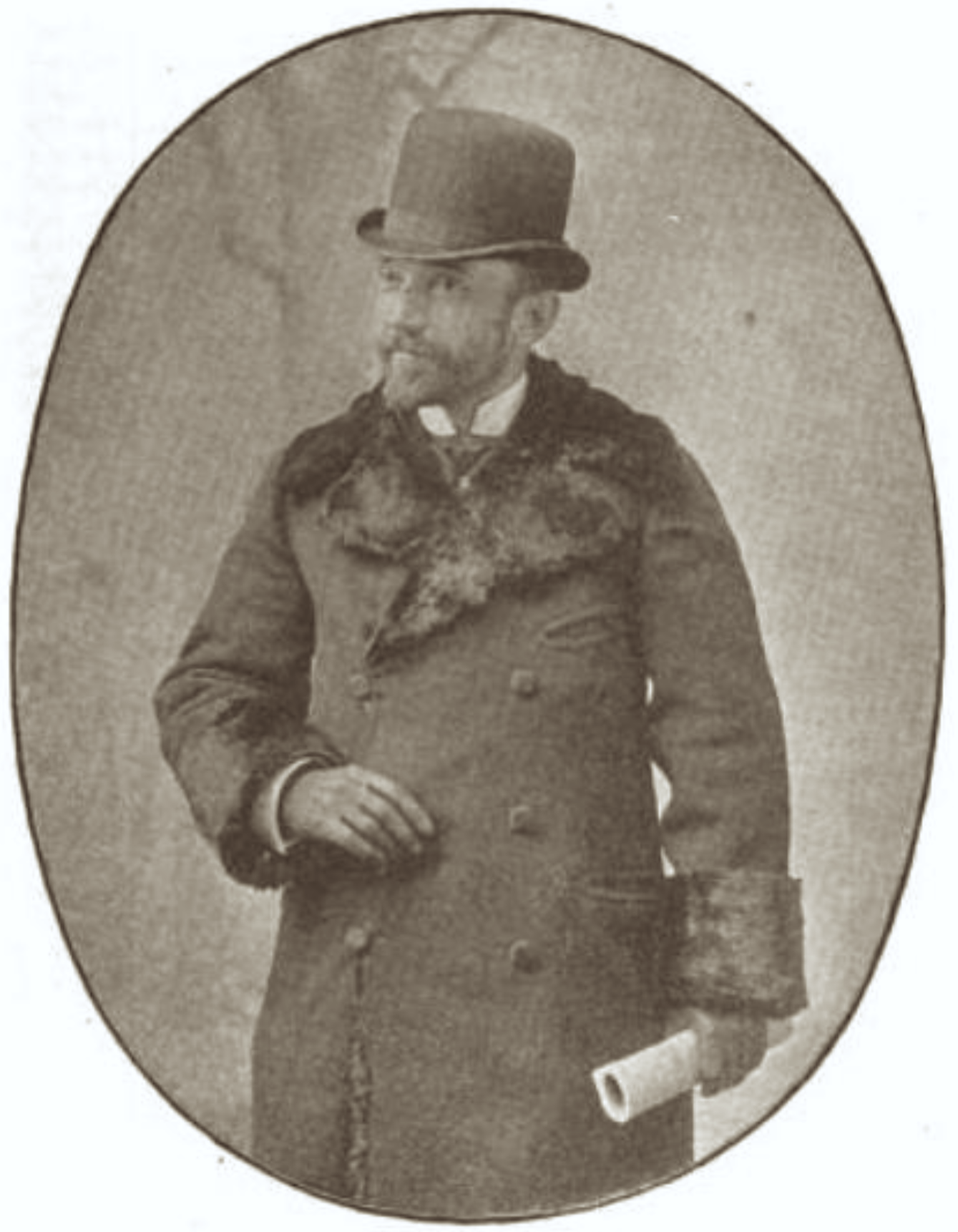
William Rogers Chapman

In 1883 Chapman founded the Banks Glee Club, a men's chorus made up of men working in the banking sector in New York City. This group was the seed for the Musurgia Choral Society (MCS, often shortened to Musurgia Society) which was established the following year in 1884 but with several professionally trained singers in the group. It was one of New York's better men's choruses, with a reputation similar to Joseph Mosenthal's Mendelssohn Glee Club. The press viewed these groups as rival organizations. The NYP was its partner organization, and its members regularly accompanied the chorus in its concerts. Chapman collaborated closely with Theodore Thomas who was then the NYP's conductor. Many prominent musicians appeared as soloists with the MCS, among them sopranos Lilli Lehmann and Mary Howe; tenors William H. Rieger and Charles Herbert Clarke; harpist Maud Morgan; and violinists Michael Banner and Ovide Musin.

In 1886 Chapman founded a singing class for female students who were former pupils of his at NYCPS and had wanted to continue music studies after graduation. This group evolved into New York's first women's choral society, the Rubinstein Club (RC, named for Anton Rubinstein), which was formally organized under that name in 1887. The club quickly gained an outstanding reputation and counted among its members many of the best church singers in the city, and many society women of New York with whom it became a "fad" to join. Its board was made up of almost all women, including Lucy Skidmore Scribner, who was the choir's treasurer when it was founded. Later Mabel McKinley, niece of American president William McKinley, was elected president of the RC's board in 1903.

The New York Herald critic wrote the following in his review of the RC's first concert on December 15, 1887, at Chickering Hall in which they were accompanied by an orchestra made up of members of the New York Philharmonic:

William R. Chapman is the musical director of the club, and his work deserves unqualified praise. The material at his command is, fortunately, remarkably good. The soprano voices are bright and fresh, while the contraltos have power, fullness and depth. Their singing was characterized by admirable attention to light and shade, the time was perfect, and even in the unaccompanied numbers the pitch was well maintained. The Rubinstein Club has certainly made a most successful beginning, for a more enjoyable choral concert has not been heard here for a long time. Excellent taste was shown in the selection of the programme, in which nothing was hackneyed and there was just enough instrumental music to relieve the vocal. The great pianist and composer whose name has been adopted by the new society was well represented in the programme, which contained a copy of a letter from him to Mr. Chapman wishing the club success and regretting that he had no suitable unpublished composition to send for the opening concert.

The RC was led by Chapman for 47 years until ill health forced him to resign in May 1934. The RC performed concerts as many of New York's top venues, among them the Metropolitan Opera House ("Met"), Carnegie Hall, and Mendelssohn Hall. One of Victor Herbert's earliest appearances as a concert cellist was with the RC in 1887. On the 25th anniversary of the RC a special banquet was given honoring Chapman and his wife (who was a longtime leader in the women's group) that was hosted by John Philip Sousa and featured Lillian Nordica as a guest singer. At its 30th anniversary celebration in 1917, the RC was joined by Enrico Caruso among a litany of other musical luminaries and that same year Amelita Galli-Curci was a soloist with the RC at one of their concerts. During World War I the RC was highly active in raising funds for the war effort, purchasing millions of war bonds with money the chorus raised. The organization was also involved in caring for wounded soldiers sent home to recover.

Despite its successes, the RC did receive negative feedback in the press for simply being an ensemble of all women, with prominent critic Henry Edward Krehbiel writing "A female chorus cannot be a success, and if you should form one of angels from heaven, with Saint Cecilia as conductress, I would say the same." Krehbiel remained one of Chapman's most severe critics.

In 1888 the RC and MCS joined together to form a mixed chorus under the name Metropolitan Musical Society (MMS) for performances at the Met, at which time Chapman's portrait was hung in theatre alongside the other Met conductors. This third chorus became its own independent group, although many singers from the RC and MCS continued to be active in the MMS. All three of these choirs were active with the NYP, notably joining the orchestra to perform Beethoven's Symphony No. 9 for the conclusion of its 48th season. In 1889 the MMS collaborated with Anton Seidl for a music festival at the Met in which they performed music by Felix Mendelssohn with Chapman conducting. In 1892 the MMS performed with Adelina Patti at Madison Square Garden. Seidl succeeded Thomas as conductor of the NYP, and the MMS continued to perform with the orchestra under his leadership. After Seidl's death in 1898 the relationship between the NYP and Chapman and his choirs continued under NYP conductor Emil Paur, including another performance of Symphony No. 9 in 1900.

Chapman resigned from his post as director of the MS in 1892 with his final concert leading the chorus being on April 20 of that year at Carnegie Hall with George and Lillian Henschel as soloists. By this time he had was teaching on the music faculty at Vassar College. His departure from the choir was under tense circumstances, and he essentially resigned before being forced out. Immediately after his resignation, he founded another men's chorus, the Apollo Club of New York (ACNY), with about a third of the MS members leaving with him. In the 1897-1898 season both the RC and ACNY began performing their seasons in the new performance hall at the Waldorf-Astoria. It remained the RC's home until the hotel was demolished in 1929. In 1898 Chapman was principal conductor of the Worcester Music Festival, replacing Carl Zerrahn at the last minute when Zerrahn resigned from his post just prior to the event.

In 1897 Chapman founded the Maine Music Festival (MMF), and the Maine Symphony Orchestra which was attached to the festival. He was director of that annual music festival for 30 years. Under his leadership the MMF gained a reputation as one of the United States' top classical music festivals, and the MMF notably drew larger crowds than any previous musical event held in that state up to that point in history. The festival initially focused on major choral works like oratorios, and more than 5000 singers from Maine participated in choirs attached to the festival during its history. Eventually the festival grew to include staged operas. The festival attracted many well known singers of the period, among them, sopranos Nellie Melba, Frances Alda, Geraldine Farrar, Rosa Raisa, Emma Calvé, Margaret Woodrow Wilson, Emma Eames, Maria Jeritza, Marcella Sembrich, Amelita Galli-Curci, Nina Morgana, and Lillian Blauvelt; contraltos Louise Homer Margaret Matzenauer, and Ernestine Schumann-Heink; baritones Lawrence Tibbett and Gwilyn Miles; and tenors John McCormack, Beniamino Gigli, Edward Johnson, Armand Tokatyan, and Evan Williams.

== Retirement and death ==
Chapman retired after the 30th annual MMF in 1926. In June 1926 he was awarded an honorary doctorate in music from the University of Maine. In his later life he was a friend of American entertainer Will Rogers. In December 1933 ill health forced him to abandon his conducting responsibilities. He led the RC one final time on February 20, 1934, in a performance with soprano Rosemarie Brancato. It was his final concert.

Chapman died in Palm Beach, Florida, on March 27, 1935, at the age of 79.
