= Muriel Wilson =

American soprano and actress (1901–1969)

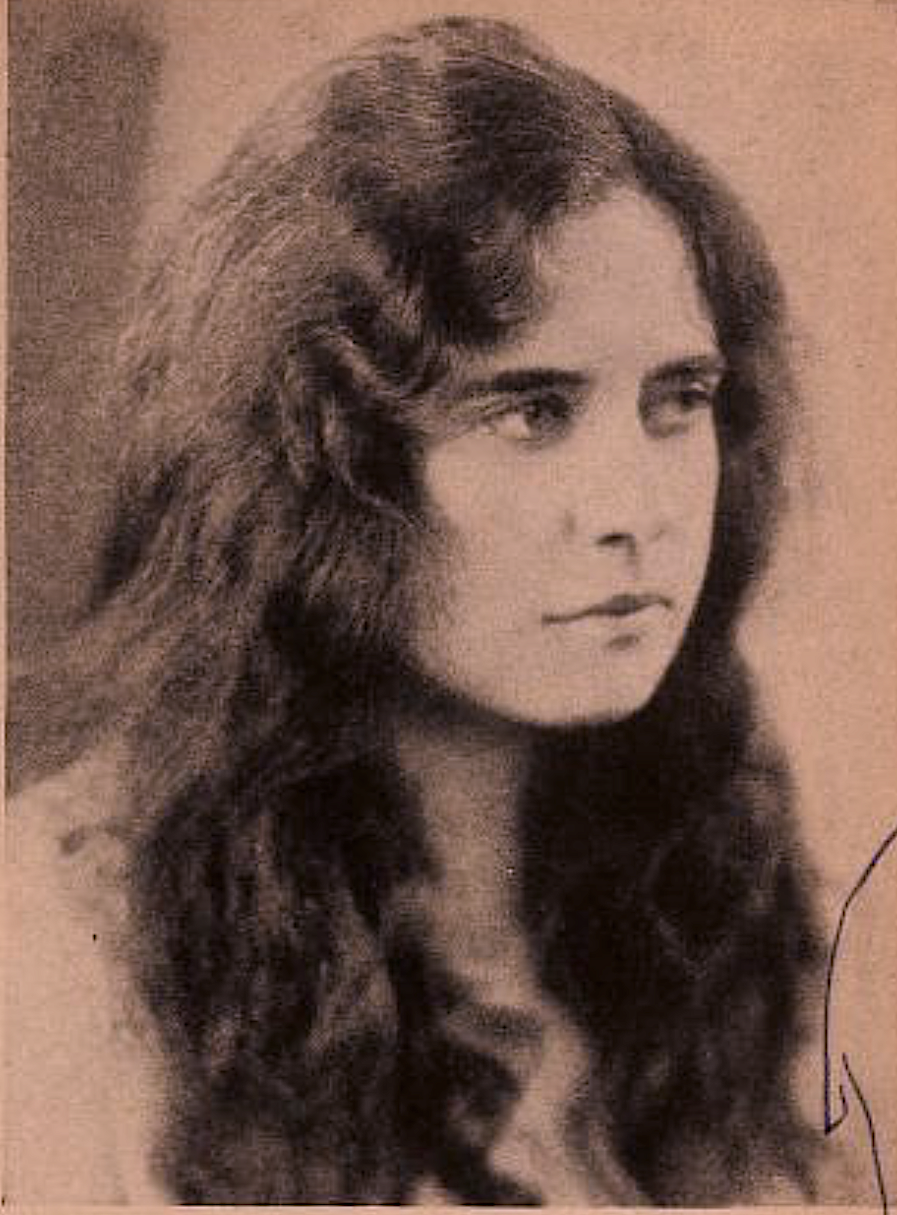
- Muriel Wilson in 1930
- Born: Muriel Helen Wilson; June 29, 1901; New York City, U.S.
- Died: May 3, 1969 (aged 67); Yonkers, New York, U.S.
- Other names: Muriel Hufsmith (married name)
- Occupations: Soprano actress
- Years active: 1919–1950s
- Spouse: Fred Hufsmith

Muriel Helen Wilson (June 29, 1901 – May 3, 1969), also known by her married name Muriel Hufsmith, was an American soprano and actress who was active from 1919 into the 1950s. She made her Broadway debut in Harold Orlob's musical Nothing But Love (1919) and subsequently returned to Broadway in Adrienne (1923) and The Young Idea (1932). She was primarily active as a church vocalist during the 1920s, and sang in a sacred music quartet on the radio programs Midweek Hymn Sing and Shut-In Hour during the early years of American radio. In the late 1920s, she became a regular performer in performances of light operas on The Philco Hour radio program.

Wilson is best known for creating the role of Alison Travers in the premiere of Charles Wakefield Cadman and Nelle Richmond Eberhart's radio opera The Willow Tree in 1932, and for her work as a main cast member of the popular musical radio program Maxwell House Show Boat (1932–1935) in which she was the singing voice of the part of Mary Lou. She was also a regular singer on the NBC Radio program Gems and Melody (1933–1935). She made several recordings with the Victor Talking Machine Company in the 1930s and early 1940s as a performer in duets, trios, and quartets. She was also active as an oratorio singer and remained active as a church vocalist throughout her career. Her husband and frequent performing partner was the tenor Fred Hufsmith.

== Early life and education ==
The daughter of William and Nellie Wilson, Muriel Helen Wilson was born in New York City on June 29, 1901. Her father was a dry goods merchant on the West Side of Manhattan who was at one time president of the West Side Dry Goods Association. Her mother was the organist and choir director at Faith Presbyterian Church located at 359 West 48th Street in Manhattan. She was also a well-known suffragist in New York City who was heavily involved in the Republican Party; notably serving as a superdelegate to the United States presidential nominating convention.

Muriel studied music at the American Institute of Applied Arts in New York City. She also studied singing privately in New York City with tenor William H. Rieger, who was her principal voice teacher.

== Career ==
Wilson made her Broadway debut at the Lyric Theatre in 1919 as Josephine in Harold Orlob's musical Nothing But Love. She later returned to Broadway in Albert Von Tilzer's Adrienne (1923) and Noël Coward's The Young Idea (1932, as Priscilla Hartleberry). She worked as a church vocalist at the Fourth Avenue Methodist Church in Brooklyn in 1920, and by 1922 was the resident soprano at All Souls Church in that city. In 1921 Wilson starred in a production of the three act farce Billy's Bungalow in Brooklyn. That same year she performed at an event featuring former Secretary to the President of the United States Elijah W. Halford that was sponsored by the YMCA of Greater New York.

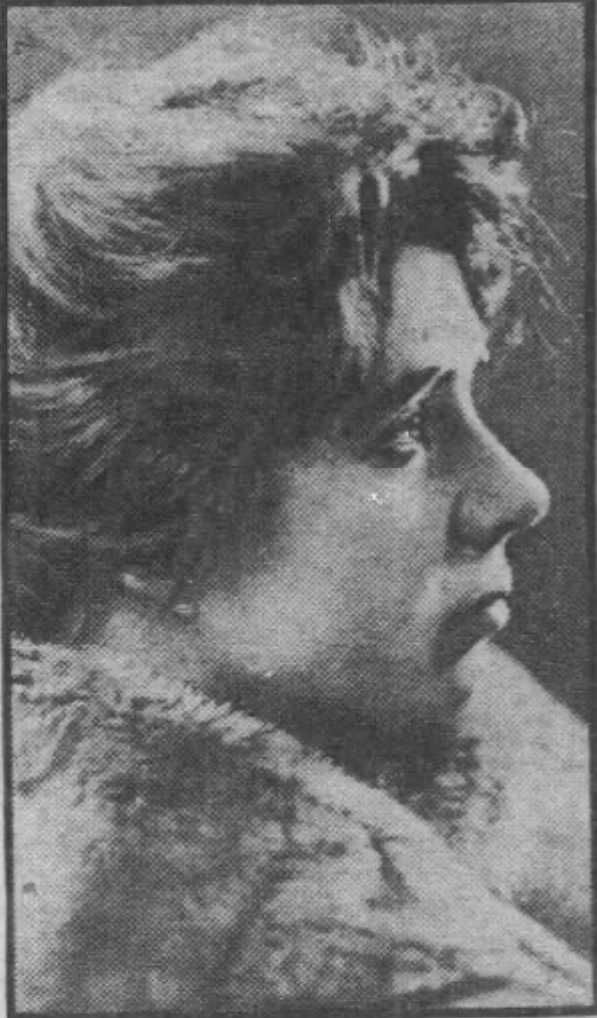
Wilson in 1922

While traveling in a vehicle on July 3, 1921, Wilson was struck by a car which fractured her skull. The accident led to a lawsuit in which she said her injuries impaired her ability to sing. She sought damages of $25,000 but the case was eventually settled out of court for $4,300. In 1922 she starred as Mimi in the musical The Cameo Girl at the Brooklyn Academy of Music. In March 1923 she gave a recital which was broadcast nationally on the radio, and the following December performed for the 68th United States Congress and U.S. president Calvin Coolidge during an official ceremony in which the president was addressing that legislative body. That performance was broadcast on national radio. She subsequently became a regular performer on the radio in the 1920s on the sacred music programs Midweek Hymn Sing and Shut-In Hour in which she sang in a vocal quartet with baritone Arthur Billings Hunt, tenor Hunt Dengler, and contralto Helen Janke. She also toured in vaudeville in the mid 1920s.

In 1925 Wilson toured with the Chapman Concert Company. In November 1927 she performed the role of Annabel in an NBC Radio production of Reginald De Koven's opera Robin Hood with Colin O'More in the title role and Jessica Dragonette as Maid Marian. It was broadcast nationally on The Philco Hour program. She was featured on this program again the following month as Pepita in Leslie Stuart's Havana. She performed roles in several more light operas on The Philco Hour; among them Gretchen in The Red Mill (1928), Mother Superior in The Serenade (1928), Lila in Gypsy Love (1928), Lady Maude in Eileen (1928), Juliska Racz in Der Zigeunerprimas (1928), Mlle Pompon in The Fortune Teller (1928), Molly Seamore in The Geisha, Desiree in The Pink Lady (1928), Gretchen in The Student Prince (1929), Mitzi in Blossom Time (1929), and Huguette in The Vagabond King (1929) among others.

In 1929 Wilson performed the role of Abydos in The Wizard of the Nile with the National Light Opera, and portrayed Micaëla in Georges Bizet's Carmen with the National Grand Opera Company. That same year she was a performer in a concert organized by ASCAP honoring Victor Herbert on the fifth anniversary of his death at the Ritz-Carlton Hotel.

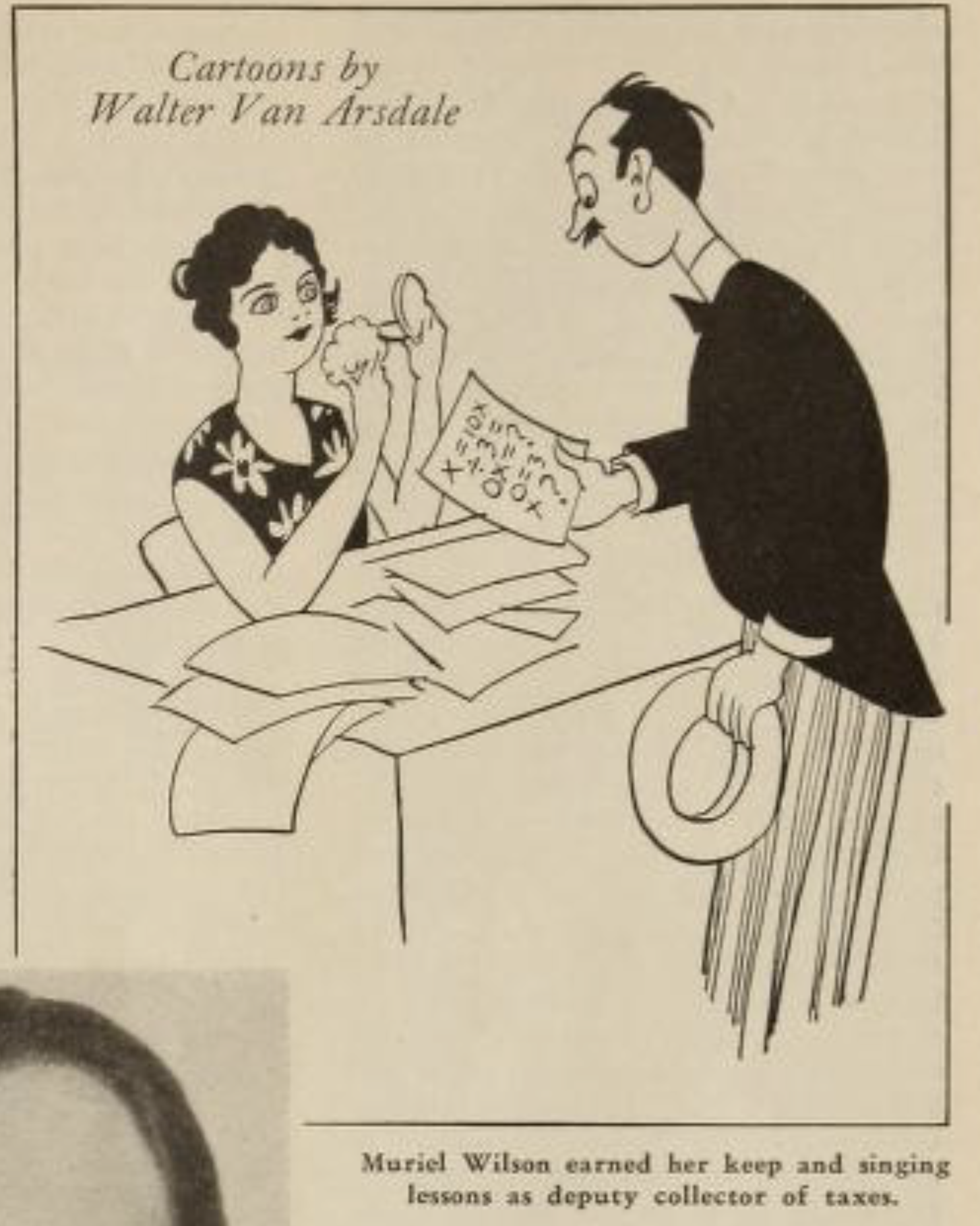
June 1931 cartoon of Wilson in Radio Digest. The cartoon features her working for the Internal Revenue Service by day; a job she held during her early days as a radio singer.

On October 3, 1932, she starred in the world premiere of Charles Wakefield Cadman and Nelle Richmond Eberhart's radio opera The Willow Tree. She created the role of the temptress Alison Travers in this production. It was conducted by Cesare Sodero who led the NBC National Grand Opera Orchestra for national broadcast on NBC Radio. Also in the cast was tenor Frederick Hufsmith whom Muriel later married in 1938. Wilson and Hufsmith were both resident singers on the NBC Radio program Gems and Melody which was aired nationally from 1933–1935. Without her husband she starred as the character Mary Lou as a principal cast member in the musical radio program Maxwell House Show Boat from 1932–1935. It was the most popular radio program in the United States during those years.

Wilson made several recordings for the Victor Talking Machine Company during the 1930s which are catalogued in the Discography of American Historical Recordings. In 1930 she recorded as a member of the Rondoliers Quartette, and in 1935 she recorded as a member of a female vocal trio whose other members included Elsie Baker and Ruth Rogers. She also recorded several duets with Rogers and performed in a number of other duets, trios and quartets for Victor in 1939 and 1941.

Wilson and her husband performed in concerts together into the 1950s. They were also active singers in sacred music performances at various churches; including the Pro-Cathedral in Brooklyn and the St. Rose of Lima Church in Manhattan. She was also active as an oratorio soloist in works like Johann Sebastian Bach's St Matthew Passion George Frideric Handel's Messiah, and Alfred Gaul's The Holy City. In 1941 she performed on the radio with the Mormon Tabernacle Choir.

Wilson died at Yonkers General Hospital on May 3, 1969.
