= Rosaline Greene =

American actress

Rosaline Greenberg (December 3, 1905 – December 17, 1987), known as Rosaline Greene, was an American actress called "the girl with the most beautiful speaking voice on the air". By November 1935, she had portrayed more characters than any other woman on the radio.

== Early years ==
Greene was born in Hempstead, New York to Polish Jewish emigrants Israel Greenberg and Celia Horowitz. Greene's home town was Bay Shore, New York. She was an honor graduate of the New York State College for Teachers. Following her graduation, she taught at Hamilton Range School.

== Career ==
=== WGY Players ===
Greene's professional debut as an actress came on radio when she was an 18-year-old college student. She was selected to be a member of the WGY Players although she "had never been on a stage and could not 'project'". That company presented a full-length production of Eugene Walter's The Wolf on August 3, 1922, and in September the group began performing a new play on WGY each Friday night, averaging 2.5 hours in length. By April 1924, WGY plays were extended via network connections to audiences in Washington, D.C., and New York City (over WRC and WJZ, respectively). Greene was the troupe's leading lady, earning $5 per week.

One of Greene's performances on WGY led to a theatrical opportunity in New York City. Max Marcin heard the Players' presentation of his play Silence with Greene in the leading role and "was so impressed by Miss Greene's interpretation of the part that after an interview she was engaged to understudy the leading lady in the New York company."

=== Other radio ===
After Greene left WGY, she worked at WOR radio where, in addition to her acting, she formed the Rosaline Greene Players and directed the ensemble of "college graduates, young and experienced professionals" as they acted on radio. On network radio, Greene was mistress of ceremonies on The Hour of Charm. On Maxwell House Show Boat, she acted the role of Mary Lou, and Muriel Wilson sang Mary Lou's songs. Greene portrayed Joyce Carraway on Stories of the Black Chamber and Peggy on Peggy's Doctor. Other radio programs on which Greene performed included Grand Central Station, Ziegfeld Follies, Portia Faces Life and The Eveready Hour. Her debut on The Eveready Hour was in the title role of a production of Joan of Arc on November 13, 1928.

== Personal life ==
Greene married radio broadcaster Joseph Maurice Barnett, a widower, in 1936 in Manhattan. He was later a talent agent for famed impresario Sol Hurok. They had a daughter, Liana, and sons Alan and Nick, as well as a son from his first marriage, Joseph. After his retirement in 1963, they moved to Los Angeles, where he died in 1978 and she died in 1987.

== Recognition ==
In 1926, while Greene was a member of the WGY Players, she won a contest at the Radio World's Fair at Madison Square Garden to be designated possessor of "The Perfect Radio Voice".
