= Charles Herbert Clarke =

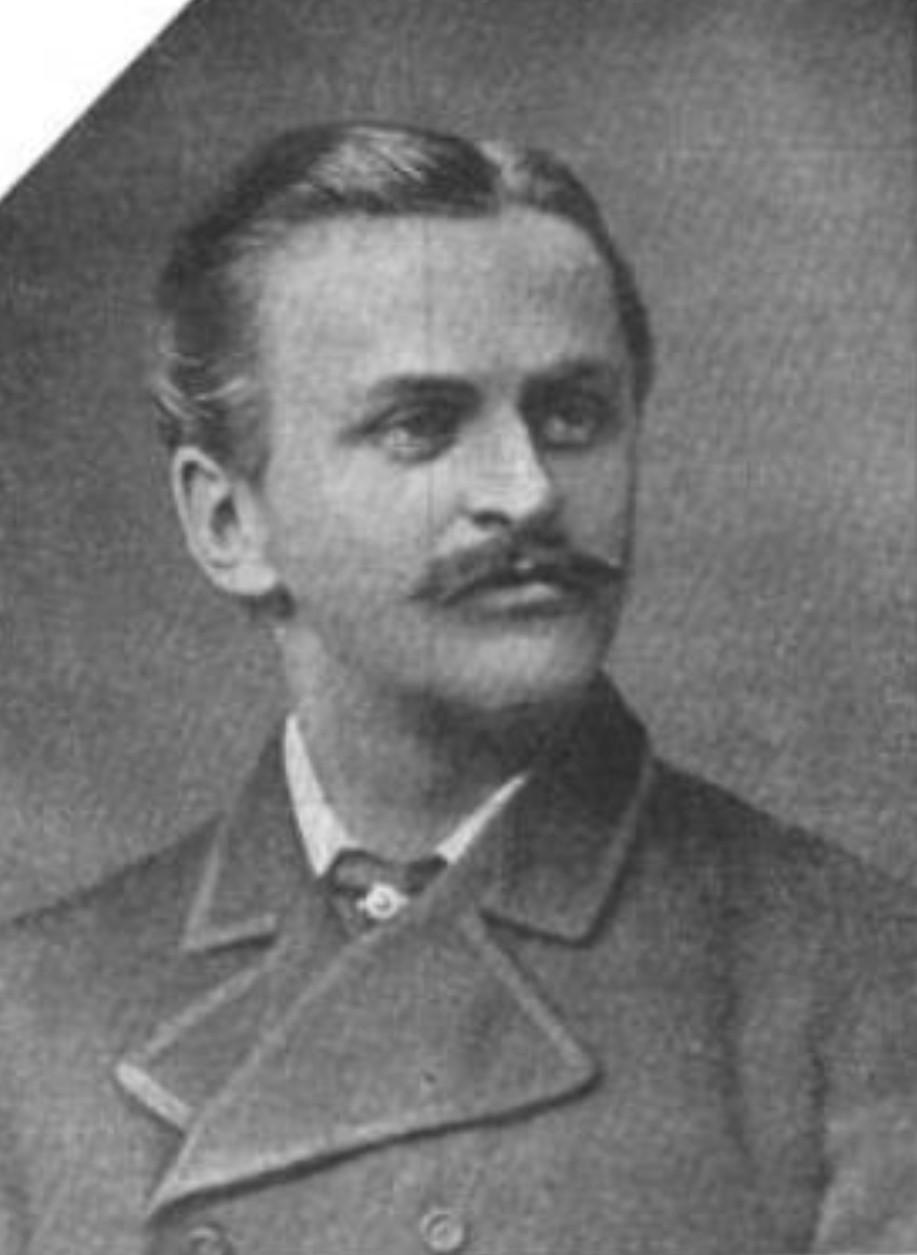
Charles Herbert Clarke as depicted on the front cover of The Musical Courier on October 14, 1891.

Charles Herbert Clarke (originally spelled Clark) (February 14, 1852 – August 23, 1928) was an American tenor, church musician, choral conductor, and music educator. Born in New Ipswich, New Hampshire, he was initially a child performer alongside his relatives in the Clark Troupe. He studied music in Boston where he began his career as a church musician before branching out into work as a concert and opera tenor. In c. 1880 he went to Europe for further studies in London and Italy, and by 1882 was back in the United States residing in Chicago where he worked as a church vocalist, music teacher, and a member of local opera companies. There he met the soprano Jennie Herrick whom he married in 1884. In 1885 Clarke and his wife relocated to New York City where he was active as a concert tenor, choral conductor, church musician, and music educator. He was a longtime performer of the Mendelssohn Quartet; an all-male classical vocal quartet, and for many years operated a voice studio out of Carnegie Hall.

== Early life and career ==
The son of John Prescott Clark and Mary Clark (nee Emerson), Charles Herbert Clark (later spelled Clarke) was born on February 14, 1852 in New Ipswich, New Hampshire. Born into a musical family, he performed as a child with his father, uncle, and siblings as part of the Clark Troupe. He began his adult career in Boston, Massachusetts where he also received his music education. He initially worked as a church singer at first Old South Church and then King's Chapel.

In 1872 Clarke was a founding member of the Boston Highland Musical Association which was established as a performance group for participation in the World's Peace Jubilee and International Musical Festival. In 1873 he was a member of the Ingleside Quartette. In January 1875 he portrayed Lyonel in the opera Martha at Boston's Kennedy Hall. The following June he performed the role of Fabrice in Friedrich von Flotow's L'ombre at the Chelsea Academy of Music. He reprised his role in Martha in Boston in 1878, and that same year was also seen in Verdi's Il trovatore. In 1879 he was a soloist at the New Hampshire Music Festival. He was also active as an oratorio soloist in Boston in 1870s until he left for Europe for music studies in London and Italy.

== Marriage and work in Chicago ==
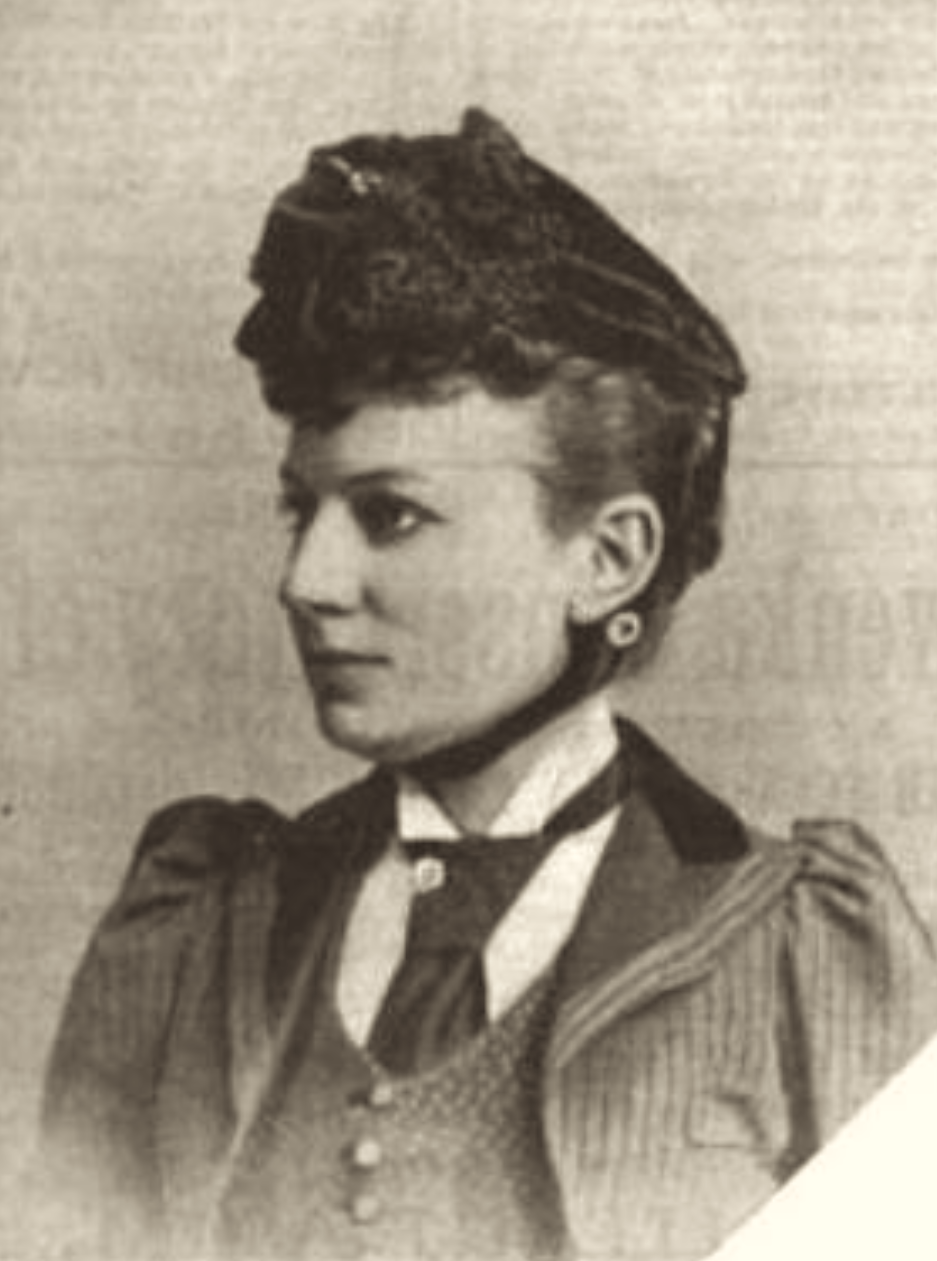
Mrs. Charles Herbert Clarke (a.k.a Jennie Herrick) from the front cover of The Musical Courier.

After returning to the United States, Clarke settled in Chicago where he was engaged as a director of music at Trinity Church. He was also active in Chicago as a voice teacher and a music educator at a school for girls. One of his pupils in Chicago was tenor Whitney Mockridge.

In January 1884 Clarke married Jennie Herrick in Chicago when they were both members of the Chicago Ideal Opera Company (CIOC). The couple had previously performed together with the Chicago Church Choir Company (CCCC) in Gilbert and Sullivan's Patience in 1882. Jessie Bartlett Davis was in the company as Lady Angela and Jennie portrayed the title role with Clarke as Archibald Grosvenor. The couple also appeared together in the CCCC production of The Pirates of Penzance with Jennie as Mabel and Charles as Frederic. With the CIOC Jennie appeared as Phyllis and Charles as Strephon in Iolanthe in 1883.

== Later life and career ==
In 1885 Clarke and wife moved to New York City where Charles was engaged as a singer at West Presbyterian Church and as director of music at Madison Avenue M.E. Church. He was concurrently active in New York as a voice teacher and music educator, and also taught on the voice faculty of New Haven Conservatory of Music in Connecticut. In the second half of the 1880s he was active as a concert tenor in sacred music events, such as oratorio performances, held at New York churches. He was a longtime member of the Mendelssohn Quartet (MQ), a men's classical vocal group, beginning in the 1880s. He was still actively performing in concerts as a member of the MQ as late as 1915.

In January and May 1889 Clarke was a soloist at the Metropolitan Opera House in a concert put on by the Metropolitan Musical Society under conductor William Rogers Chapman. In March 1889 he was a soloist in Ludwig van Beethoven's Symphony No. 9 with the New York Symphony Society and Oratorio Society of New York (OSNY). In December 1889 he was a soloist in Handel's Messiah with the Toronto Philharmonic Society. In February 1890 he was a soloist in Wolfgang Amadeus Mozart's Coronation Mass with the Toronto Choral Society. The following month he performed the premieres of two songs by Gerrit Smith, "Marjory" and "Dein Angesicht", at a Manuscript Society of New York concert. In 1893 he was a soloist in Edward Grell's Missa Solemnis with the OSNY under conductor Damrosch.

In 1896 Clarke was a soloist in Gerrit Smith's cantata King David at South Church. In May 1898 he performed the part of Frederic in The Pirates of Penzance with the Permanent Opera Company in Buffalo, New York. The following October he was a soloist in Dudley Buck's The Nun of Nidaros in a concert in Allentown, Pennsylvania at Central Market Hall.

By 1904 Clarke was working as the music director at First Church of Christ, Scientist in New York City. In 1906 he composed new music to Hans Henry Petersen's "I'm a Pilgrim, I'm a Stranger" which was performed by his wife. In the 1910s he and his wife were living in Brooklyn. At that time he was active as the director of church choir at in Perth Amboy, New Jersey where he also was conductor of the Orpheus Society choir since its founding in 1903. He also operated a studio as a voice teacher located inside Carnegie Hall during the late 19th and early 20th centuries.

Charles Herbert Clarke died in Stonington, Connecticut on August 23, 1928.
