= Fred Hufsmith =

American tenor (1897–1970)

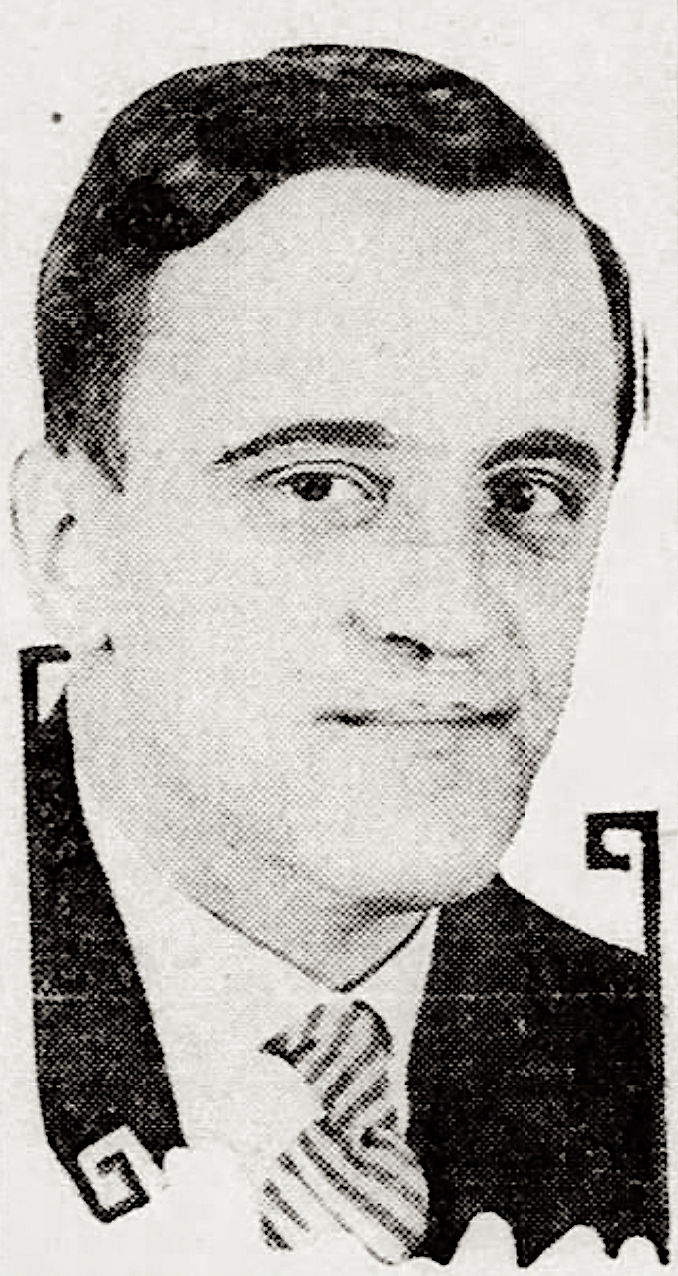
- Born: January 5, 1897; Bethlehem, Pennsylvania
- Died: May 14, 1970 (aged 73); Miami, Florida
- Occupation: Tenor
- Spouse: Muriel Wilson

Frederick Russell Hufsmith (January 5, 1897 – May 14, 1970) was an American tenor. Born in Bethlehem, Pennsylvania, and raised in nearby Slatington, he was active on the Chautauqua circuit as an oratorio soloist in the early 1920s before studying music at the University of Miami where he graduated in 1928. He moved to New York where he was best known for his performances as a contracted singer for NBC Radio in the 1930s and 1940s. He frequently performed with his wife, the soprano Muriel Wilson, including in the world premiere of Charles Wakefield Cadman and Nelle Richmond Eberhart's radio opera The Willow Tree (1932) and on the program Gems and Melody (1933–1935). He continued to perform in concerts with his wife into the early 1950s.

== Early life, education, and early career ==
The son of Edwin Franklin Hufsmith, Frederick R. Hufsmith was born in Bethlehem, Pennsylvania, on January 5, 1897. He grew up in Slatington, Pennsylvania, and attended Slatington High School. In 1915 he joined the staff of the Slatington News. In 1918 he served briefly in the United States Army during World War I. After the war, he studied singing in Philadelphia with Frederick Leonard.

Hufsmith began his career as a church singer in 1921 at Salem Lutheran Church in Bethlehem, and was frequently heard in local concerts in the region around Allentown and Bethlehem. He later worked on the music staff of the Church of the Advocate in Philadelphia. In 1923 he performed with the Swarthmore Chautauqua association as an oratorio soloist. From 1924 until 1926 he was a member of the Conly Concert Company. In December 1924 he performed as part of a vocal quartet in a concert sponsored by the Philadelphia Music League at the Pennsylvania Academy of the Fine Arts. In May 1926 he was a soloist in a concert version of the opera Mignon at the The Bellevue-Stratford Hotel that was conducted by Alexander Smallens. In summer of 1927 he toured the Chautauqua circuit as Jack Travers in the operetta The Firefly.

By the fall of 1926 Huffsmith was studying music at the University of Miami (UM) in Florida where he was a voice student of Elise Graziani. While there he starred as Lyonel in the school's production of Friedrich von Flotow's Martha. After graduating from the school in 1928, he moved to New York City. He later returned to the UM as the featured guest soloist in UM Symphony Orchestra's January 1930 concert under conductor Arnold Volpe. He returned to Miami again in 1932 to give a concert at the Mana-Zucca Club.

In New York, Huffsmith continued to study singing with Romano Romani (teacher of Rosa Ponselle) and Solon Alberti.

== Career in New York and on radio ==
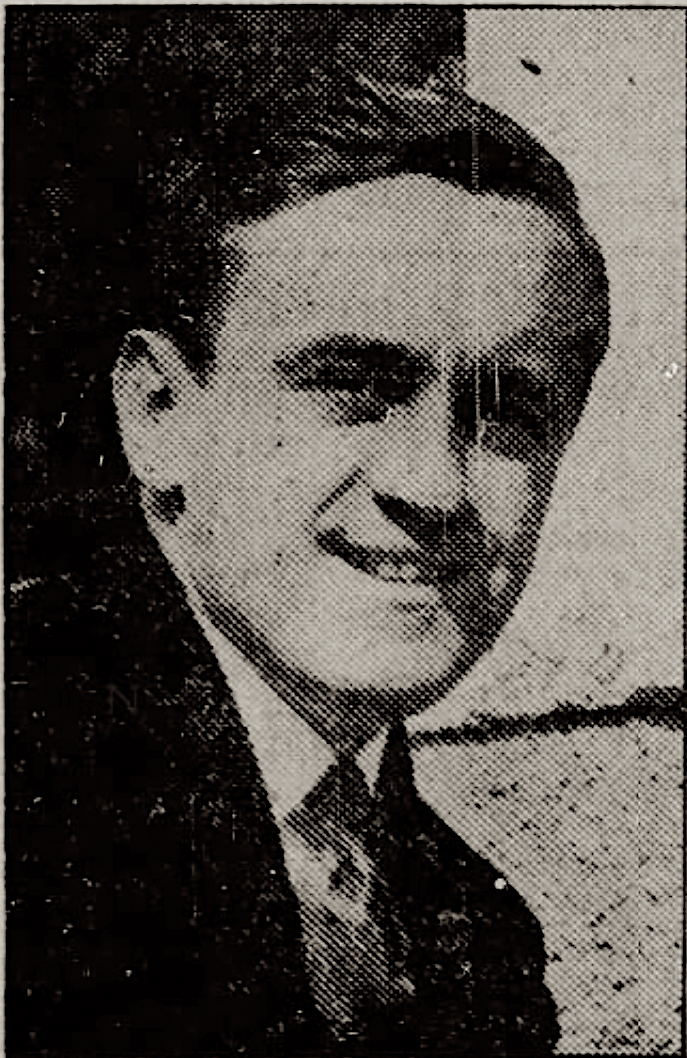
Fred Hufsmith

Hufsmith worked as a church singer in New York at the Fourth Presbyterian Church. In 1929 he made his first appearance on the concert stage in New York City singing with the Barbizon String Quartet. Soon after he became a contract singer with NBC Radio, performing weekly as a soloist on national broadcasts. He performed frequently on the Westinghouse Broadcasting programs with Cesare Sodero and his orchestra. On December 27, 1931 Hufsmith sang the title role in Richard Wagner's Lohengrin in a radio broadcast of the complete opera with the NBC Symphony Orchestra and conductor Walter Damrosch.

Some of the NBC Radio programs in which Hufsmith was a regular featured singer included McKesson Musical Magazine (1932), Gilbert and Sullivan Gems (1933), The Golden Blossom Revue (1933), and Yesterday and Today (1942). In the 1940s he was the resident tenor on Harry Emerson Fosdick's radio program. He performed the role of Ralph Rackstraw in Gilbert and Sullivan's H.M.S. Pinafore with conductor Emile Coté on the 1942 RCA Victor recording of the operetta.

In 1938 Hufsmith married soprano Muriel Wilson. Muriel and Fred frequently performed together on the radio in the 1930s and 1940s. The pair worked together as regular singers on the radio program Gems and Melody (1933–1935). They also starred opposite each other in the world premiere of Charles Wakefield Cadman and Nelle Richmond Eberhart's radio opera The Willow Tree which had its debut broadcast on October 3, 1932. Fred portrayed the role of Gordon who cheats on his girldried with Alison Travers (portrayed by Muriel). On stage they performed in concerts together into the 1950s.

== Later life ==
Muriel Wilson died at Yonkers General Hospital on May 3, 1969. Hufsmith spent the end of his life in Florida where his sister lived. He died in Miami, Florida, on May 14, 1970.
