= Maxwell House Show Boat =

Radio program in the 1930s

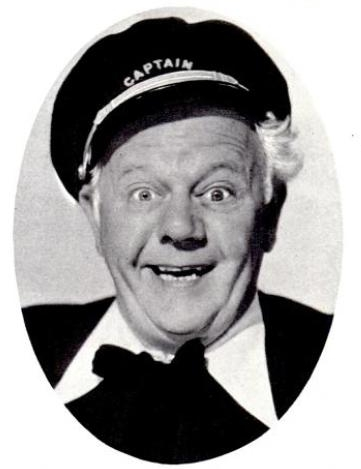
Charles Winninger as Captain Henry in 1937

Maxwell House Show Boat, originally titled Show Boat, was an hour-long American radio program that aired from 1932-1937. It was the top radio show in the United States from 1933 to 1935. It aired on NBC Radio Thursday nights, 9 pm.

== History ==
Show Boat was inspired by Jerome Kern and Oscar Hammerstein II hit musical Show Boat (1927) which was in turn based on the novel of the same name by Edna Ferber. It was put together as a program not only to entertain using material initially inspired by that show but also as a vehicle to promote Maxwell House coffee. Actor Charles Winninger, who was famous for portraying Captain Andy in the Hammerstein and Kern musical on Broadway, was hired to portray a similar character, Captain Henry, on this program. Otherwise, the Maxwell House program and the musical Show Boat had nothing to do with each other besides the fact that both had a Mississippi showboat as a setting for the action.

The program debuted with the title Show Boat on October 6, 1932 with a principal cast that included Winninger as Captain Henry, Rosaline Greene as the speaking voice of Mary Lou, Muriel Wilson as the singing voice of Mary Lou, Allyn Joslyn as the speaking voice of the Master of Ceremonies, and Lanny Ross as the singing voice of the Master of Ceremonies. Later in the first season actress Irene Hubbard was added to the program as Captain Henry' sister Maria Jamison, and Wright Kramer portrayed Maria's husband, Walter Jamison.

The show's final broadcast was on October 28, 1937.

== Main cast ==
- Charles Winninger (1932-1934, and 1937, Captain Henry)
- Frank McIntyre (1935-1936, Captain Henry)
- Allyn Joslyn (speaking voice of master of ceremonies)
- Lanny Ross (singing voice of master of ceremonies )
- Rosaline Greene as speaking voice of Mary Lou
- Muriel Wilson as singing voice of Mary Lou
- Irene Hubbard as Maria Jamison
- Wright Kramer as Walter Jamison
- Mark Smith as Uria Caldwalder
- Conrad Thibault as Himself (1934-1935)

== Other recurring performers ==
- Annette Hanshaw (1932-1934)

== See also ==
- List of most-listened-to radio programs
