= Lanny Ross =

American musician

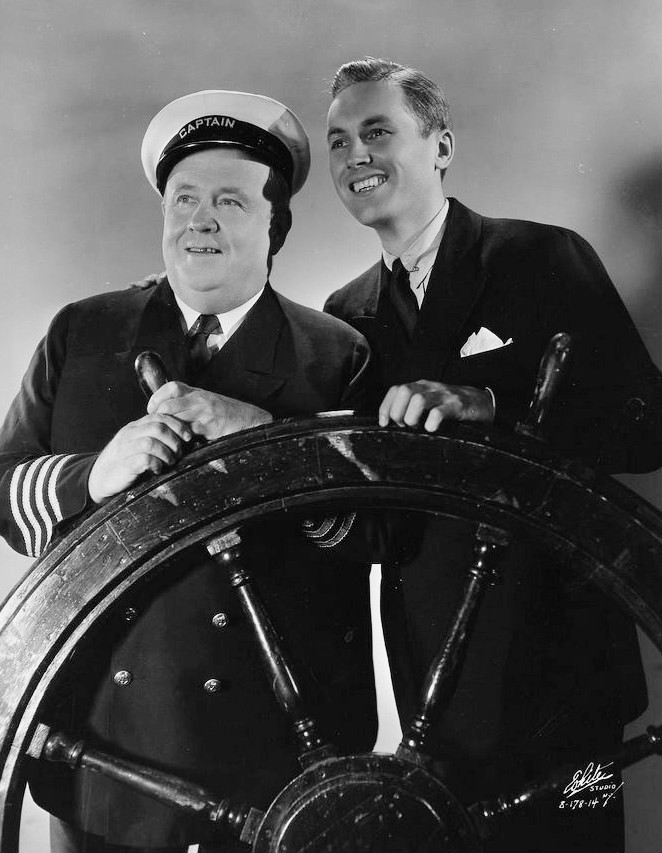
- Ross (at right, with Frank McIntyre) on the Maxwell House Show Boat radio program in 1935

Background information
- Born: January 19, 1906; Seattle, Washington, U.S.
- Origin: Taft School, Yale University, Columbia Law School
- Died: April 25, 1989 (aged 83) Gilman, Iowa
- Occupations: Singer, songwriter
- Instruments: Vocals, piano

Lanny Ross (January 19, 1906 – April 25, 1988) was an American singer, pianist, songwriter, and collegiate sprinter.

== Biography ==
He was born Lancelot Patrick Ross in Seattle, Washington. His parents were Douglas and Winifred Ross, both natives of England. He graduated from Taft School in 1924, where he captained the track team and led the glee club, and Yale University in 1928, where he blossomed as one of the nation's foremost intercollegiate track performers. As a sprinter, he won the 1928 USA Indoor Track and Field Championships title in the 300 yards.

He was also a soloist with the famous Yale Glee Club, and he was a member of Zeta Psi and Skull and Bones. Additionally, in 1931 he earned a law degree from Columbia Law School, earning the wherewithal by making radio appearances. He also studied classical vocal technique at the Juilliard School of Music with Anna Eugénie Schoen-René.

== Career ==
Lanny Ross made his theatrical bow at the age of four, performing with his father in Ben Greet's professional Shakespearean company. During his primary education in a Canadian convent and various Seattle and New York schools, young Ross confined his appearances to choir work, including term as head monitor at the Cathedral of St. John the Divine, NY. His career began in radio in 1928 and included a five-year run with Annette Hanshaw on the Maxwell House Show Boat program. His recording career began in 1929. He did so well on the radio that he gave up the legal profession and set forth on a singing career. Ross went on to success in vaudeville, nightclubs, and motion pictures.

His radio programs included Troubadour of the Moon, Maxwell House Showboat, Packard Mardi Gras, Lucky Strike Hit Parade, and his own Lanny Ross Program, sponsored by Franco-American over the CBS Network.

Ross introduced the standard popular song "Stay as Sweet as You Are" (w. Mack Gordon, m. Harry Revel) in the 1934 film College Rhythm. He recorded the song with Nat Finston and the Paramount Recording Orchestra in Los Angeles on October 21, 1934. It was released on Brunswick 7318 (matrix LA-247-A) and became Ross' most successful record. He was signed by Paramount Pictures as a threat to the studio's leading singing star, Bing Crosby. Ross starred in Melody in Spring and College Rhythm; he was slated to co-star with W. C. Fields in the 1935 film Mississippi, but he was replaced by Crosby. Paramount then released Ross, who returned to radio.

Ross was later featured in The Lady Objects (1938) for Columbia Pictures. In 1939 he lent his singing voice to Max Fleischer's animated feature, Gulliver's Travels. Ross co-wrote the song "Listen to My Heart" with Al J. Neiburg and Abner Silver. It was performed in the 1939 short film Tempo of Tomorrow by Patricia Gilmore singing with the Richard Himber Orchestra.

Ross took to the stage in 1941, drawing critical acclaim for his acting in Petticoat Fever, Pursuit of Happiness, and Green Grow the Lilacs.

In 1941 Lanny Ross, like many New York-based singers, filmed a series of three-minute musicals for coin-operated Soundies movie jukeboxes. He was accompanied by Roy Bargy and his orchestra.

In 1943 Sol Lesser produced the motion picture Stage Door Canteen, based on the actual Stage Door Canteen serving military personnel in New York during wartime. Lesser made the film as a patriotic, goodwill venture, which earned almost four million dollars. He turned over the money to the American Theater Wing to establish canteens in other cities. While half the film was made in Hollywood, the other half was made in New York, where Lanny Ross and other stars were based. Ross sang the Oscar-nominated ballad "We Mustn't Say Goodbye". It was his last motion-picture appearance; his career was interrupted by military service.

== Army officer ==
Lanny Ross joined the U.S. Army in 1943, achieving the rank of captain and, in early 1945, major. Bob Hope, touring military bases at the time, wrote: "Lanny Ross was with us in the Southwest Pacific and not only took care of us, our facilities for entertaining, etc., but also did a couple of songs whenever needed -- which was most of the time." Ross also sang on the GI radio station, WVTC. Ross's last outpost was in Yokohama, Japan; on September 30 he opened a GI theatre ("one of the two large houses to survive Allied bombings") and hosted a vaudeville revue with Army talent, after which he was honorably discharged at Fort Dix on October 20, 1945.

== Comeback, in person and on radio ==
He resumed his career on November 1, 1945, as a guest on Andre Kostelanetz's program over the CBS network. The New York Daily News reported his successful return: "Lanny is in good voice. His vibrant tenor delivers both words and music with sweet tones, smooth style, and clear-cut diction. His many fans welcome Ross, certain that he will soon again be numbered among the most popular of microphone songsters." He began a vaudeville engagement in Philadelphia, reviewed by a Variety correspondent: "Ross had the usual cold-early-Friday-afternoon audience in the palm of his hand. His voice hasn't lost any of its resonance. House almost filled when caught." Ross next went to Miami in January 1946, where he "stops the show cold."

Procter & Gamble hired Ross for a weekday-evening, 15-minute radio program, paying him $3,000 per week. The show made its debut on April 1, 1946. The Lanny Ross Show became a fixture on CBS, running through the 1950s as a weekday-afternoon, half-hour program featuring conversation, recordings, and his own vocals. He had conducted a three-week tour of Japan in late 1960, stopping near Tokyo to interview 20 Army servicemen for his radio program. He broadcast the tapes in early 1961. The program went off the air in May 1961; many of CBS Radio's longtime programs were being canceled between 1959 and 1962.

Lanny Ross largely retired from performing in the early 1970s, although he continued to do occasional shows, including a 1980 tour with bandleader Harry James. In December 1984, at age 78, he sang at three of the famous "21" restaurant's annual Christmas celebrations, accompanied (as was the 21's custom) by a Salvation Army band.

== Personal life ==
Olive Anne White (1899-1984) became his business manager in 1932; she was seven years his senior. In 1935 they were married, and stayed together for almost five decades.

In the 1940s and 1950s the Rosses lived on a farm in Stanfordville, New York, on Bangall-Amenia Road. He sold this farm to Richard C. Patterson, U. S. Ambassador to Switzerland, in April 1951, for $100,000. It subsequently came into the ownership of actor James Cagney, in May 1955, again for $100,000. Part of the road was renamed Cagney Way. The Rosses relocated to a Manhattan apartment.

Ross's wife died in 1984 at the age of 85. Ross suffered a stroke in 1987 and another in early 1988. He was admitted to Lenox Hill Hospital in New York, where he died of heart failure on April 25 at the age of 82.

== Filmography ==
Year	Title	Role	Notes
1933	Yours Sincerely	Steve Alden	Short subject
1934	Melody in Spring	John Craddock	
1934	College Rhythm	Larry Stacey	
1938	The Lady Objects	William Hayward	
1939	Gulliver's Travels	Prince David	Singing voice
1943	Stage Door Canteen	Himself	Final film
