= Cesare Sodero =

Italian composer (1886–1947)

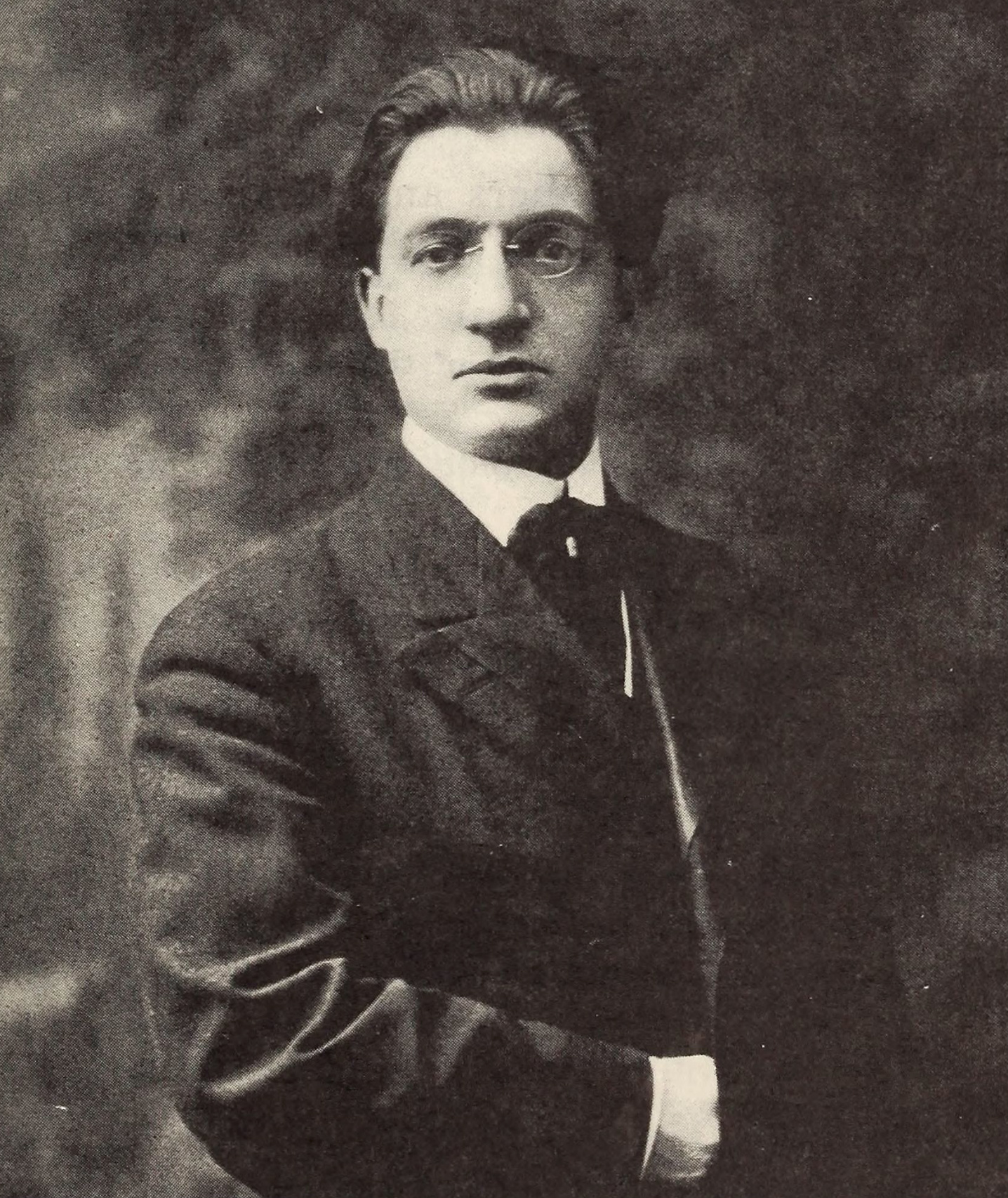
- Sodero in 1916

Personal details
- Born: August 2, 1886 Naples, Campania, Italy
- Died: December 16, 1947 (aged 61) Manhattan, New York City, U.S.
- Spouse: Carolina Cottie
- Relations: Carlo Sodero (brother) · Domenico Sodero (brother)
- Children: Cesare Jr · Riccardo · Edgardo · Manon · Ivan · Velia
- Parent: Francesco Sodero · Carolina Bartoli
- Education: Conservatorio di San Pietro a Majella
- Occupation: Conductor · musician

Cesare Sodero (August 2, 1886 – December 16, 1947) was an Italian conductor who spent much of his career working in the United States.

== Biography ==
Born in Naples, Sodero was the second child of Francesco Sodero and Carolina Bartoli. Sodero studied with Giuseppe Martucci, and graduated from the Naples Conservatory at fourteen. He made his conducting debut at the age of fifteen in 1901. He toured Europe for a short time as a cellist before coming to the United States in 1906 at the invitation of Oscar Hammerstein I.

He was principal cellist of the Manhattan Opera Company until its demise in 1910. For seven years he directed various American opera companies, among them the Hammerstein's Opera Company, the Aborn Opera Company, and the opera company run by Henry Wilson Savage. His aim was to promote American interest in Italian symphonic music.

In 1914 he became principal conductor at the New York Recording Department of Thomas A. Edison, Inc., formerly the National Phonograph Company. He contracted and conducted a wide variety of instrumental ensembles for Edison, principally focusing on band and orchestra selections. Alone of the musicians at Edison, Sodero had final say on repertoire he recorded, rather than Thomas Edison, and Sodero's instrumental recordings are some of the most colorful and imaginative of the entire acoustical recording era. Sodero also conducted the accompaniments for most of the operatic records made at Edison between 1915 and 1925, working with singers including tenor Jacques Urlus and soprano Claudia Muzio. Sodero remained with Edison until 1925, when he turned to radio.

He achieved significance as a pioneer in the broadcast of opera, directing a series of fifty-three works in tabloid form for NBC in 1926. From then until 1934 he also conducted several hundred symphonic concerts for the network; he then became music director for the Mutual network. From 1934 to 1942 he served as the conductor of the Mendelssohn Glee Club of New York.

Having worked for most of his career in the relatively "invisible" fields of recording and radio, Sodero was surprisingly appointed as the principal conductor of the Metropolitan Opera's Italian wing in 1942 on account of Ettore Panizza's deciding to remain in Argentina after the United States' entry into World War II. Sodero's Met debut, Aida on November 28, was highly successful, and critics praised Sodero's precise, powerful, yet lyrical direction. He worked steadily and successfully with the company until his death.

Sodero also composed music, and wrote one opera during his career. Titled Ombre Russe, it was given its premiere by NBC in 1929; the stage premiere took place in Venice in 1930. He also took part in the Metropolitan Opera Association's American Relief for Italy benefit in 1946, alongside George Szell, Fritz Busch, and Emil Cooper.

Sodero died in New York City in 1947.
