= Neue Nationalgalerie =

Art museum in Berlin, Germany

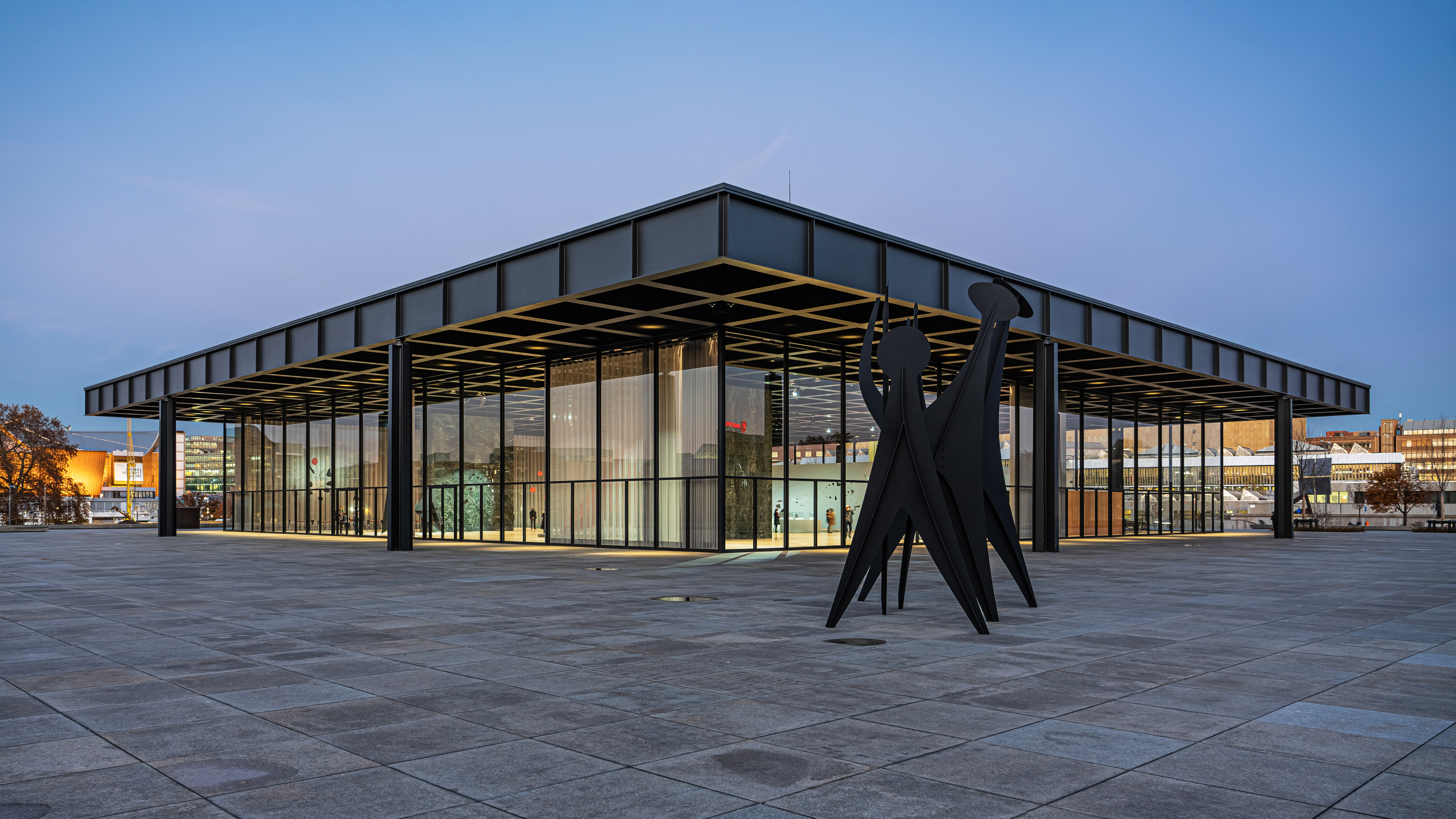

- Location within Berlin
- Established: 1968
- Location: Kulturforum, Berlin, Germany
- Coordinates: 52°30′25″N 13°22′04″E
- Architect: Ludwig Mies van der Rohe
- Website: smb.museum/en/museums-institutions/neue-nationalgalerie

The Neue Nationalgalerie (New National Gallery) at the Kulturforum is an art museum in Berlin, Germany. Its main focus is on modern art from the 20th century. It is part of the National Gallery of the Berlin State Museums. The museum building and its sculpture gardens were designed by Ludwig Mies van der Rohe and opened on 15 September 1968 in what was then West Berlin south of the Tiergarten park.

The gallery closed in 2015 for renovation. The work, by David Chipperfield Architects, was completed in 2021, and the museum reopened in August 2021 with an exhibition of works by American sculptor Alexander Calder.

== Architecture ==
=== Dimensions, specifications and materials ===
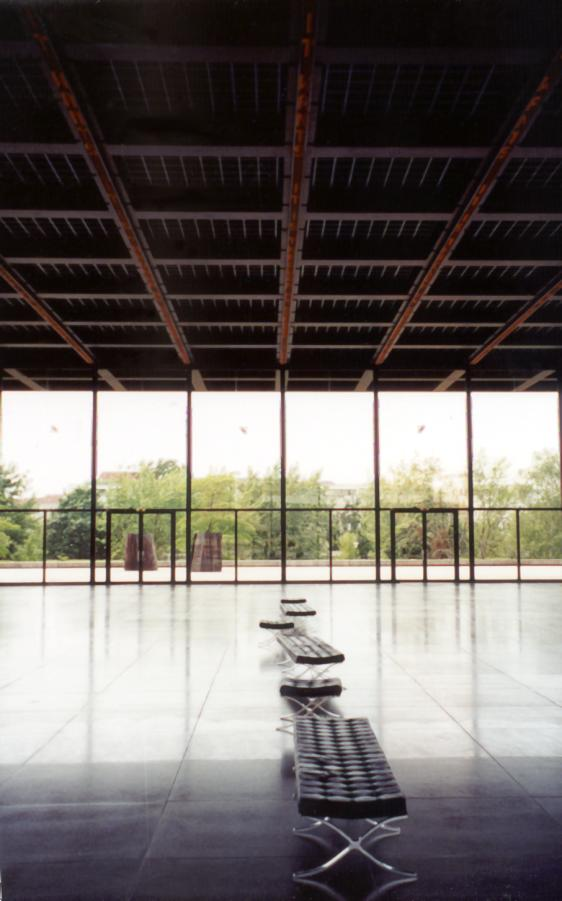
This interior view of the Neue Nationalgalerie's ground floor shows the play of light off the reflective floor, as well as the animated red LCD tracks on the ceiling.

The plan of the Neue Nationalgalerie is divided into two distinct stories. The upper story serves as an entrance hall as well as the primary special exhibit gallery, totaling 2,683 m^{2} (28,880 sq ft) of space. It is elevated from street level and only accessible by three flights of steps. Though it only comprises a small portion of the total gallery space, the exhibition pavilion stands boldly as the building's primary architectural expression. Eight cruciform columns, two on each length placed so as to avoid corners, support a square pre-stressed steel roof plate 1.8 meters (5 ft 11 in) thick and painted black. An 18-meter (59-foot) cantilever allows for ample space between the gallery's glazed façade and eight supporting columns. Mies' office studied this cantilever extensively in various scaled models in order to ensure its structural stability as well as the seeming flatness of the roof plate. The floor-to-ceiling height reaches 8.4 meters (28 ft), and the space is (laid) out on a 3.6-meter (12 ft) square dimensional grid. Black anodized aluminum "egg crates" fit within the grid house lighting fixtures, with air ducts suspended above.

The lower story serves primarily as housing for the gallery's permanent collection, though it also includes a library, offices, and a shop and café, and totals about 10,000 m^{2} (110,000 sq ft) of space. It is three-quarters below ground so as to allow for safe storage of the artwork. Its sole glazed façade looks out on the museum's sloping sculpture garden and provides ample indirect interior lighting.

A rooftop plaza further extends the museum's exhibition space.

=== Contemporaneous projects ===
In 1956, José M. Bosch, president of Ron Bacardí y Compañía, approached Mies to commission the design of a new office space in Havana. He was particularly interested in a very open plan, and the relatively simple idea Mies came up with involved a square roof plate supported on each side by two columns, entirely free of interior columns. Though initial structural challenges had to be dealt with, the resulting pavilion typology became integral to Mies' architectural lexicon, in many ways the epitome of his universal conception of space.

Planning for the Bacardí building was abandoned in September 1960 due to the political unrest in Cuba, but about the same time two other commissions were brought to Mies' office. In the summer of 1960 the wealthy industrialist Georg Schaefer approached Mies about constructing a museum in Schweinfurt for his private collection of nineteenth-century art. A modest initial plan was drawn for the structure, but later that year Mies decided to reconfigure the abandoned Bacardí project for the Schweinfurt museum because he was eager to see it constructed. A scaled-down model of the Bacardí project was created, rendered now in steel rather than concrete. Then in March 1961, Mies was contacted by Berlin's Senator for Construction and Housing who invited him to design an exhibition space for the national collection of early twentieth-century art. The two museum projects, though different in scale, were essentially identical in form, each a steel version of the original Barcardí design. Though the Schweinfurt project never came to fruition, the reductive exercise of continual reconfiguration led to a refinement of Mies' Berlin design, and the Neue Nationalgalerie remains as the sole built form of the three related plans.

=== Aesthetic importance ===
Much of Mies' syntactical development throughout the three building progression leading up to the Neue Nationalgalerie was prefigured in an earlier project for a Museum for a Small City. This project was published in a special May 1943 edition of Architectural Forum. In his publication, Mies describes a seemingly floating roof plane, suspended above a single clear-span space punctuated by equidistant columns. This project is now seen as a significant move on Mies' part toward the alleviation of interior space by both defining and minimizing structural enclosure, thus joining exterior and interior space in a meaningful way. The structure itself, a composite of little more than ground plane, support and roof, thus becomes the building. The aesthetic importance of the clear-span was directly related to Mies' conception of museum space in general, a "defining, rather than confining space". The completely open nature of the plan also serves to eliminate the barrier between art and community, simultaneously breaking down the reverence enacted by severely partitioned spaces and inviting interaction between viewer and art. The overall aesthetic affect is thus one of vitalizing liberation. This infinitely transformative capability and universality is also seen in Mies' buildings from the intervening years, namely the Farnsworth House in Plano, Illinois, and Crown Hall of the Illinois Institute of Technology campus. Various commentators have recognized the structure's ties to classical building, seeing it as a modern temple whose monumental simplicity evinces the immense skill behind its design and conception.

=== Criticism ===
The ability of clearly articulated external structures to alleviate façades and create large-scale universal spaces required certain boldness on the part of the client. The ineffable expression of the Neue Nationalgalerie's entrance pavilion had certain logistical downsides. Its smooth granite flooring reflects the warm natural light that floods the space, creating hazy shadow and making curatorial efforts notoriously complicated. The singular expression of the pavilion space also relegated the lower story to a secondary position, presenting further difficulties for the display of artwork involving a lack of natural lighting and relatively pedestrian layout of viewing space. When asked later to renovate and expand the building's lower story, Mies refused, as to do so would destroy the perfect proportions of the temple above. He originally conceived of the entrance pavilion as a place for very large works, allowing for unencumbered visual interaction and for use of the piece as space element in itself. An early collage included in the May 1943 Architectural Forum article about Museum for a Small City includes Picasso's Guernica, along with other large, plane-like paintings. Yet smaller works had to be shown on moveable freestanding walls or hanging partitions, making a curator's ability to effectively differentiate spaces difficult.

=== David Chipperfield renovation ===
Having had no thorough modernization since its inauguration, the Neue Nationalgalerie required upgrades to its air-conditioning, lighting, security, accessibility, electricity, visitor facilities and the behind-the-scenes infrastructure for moving art. In 2012 it was announced that British architect David Chipperfield would oversee a major renovation of the building. In a non-competitive selection process common for public contracts in Germany, his firm was chosen for the contract out of 24 architectural firms based on a two-stage negotiation process.

Originally planned for €101 million, the €140 million renovation project started in 2015 and was originally expected to last three years, during which time the museum was closed. Original building elements, such as handrails and shelves, were removed, restored and reinstalled in their previous locations. Archival material dating from the construction at the Museum of Modern Art in New York and the Library of Congress in Washington, DC, helped the architects remain true to Mies's design. Meanwhile, the structural framework of the roof, which rests on eight steel beams, and the glass facade was restored.

== Collection ==
The collection features a number of unique highlights of modern 20th-century art. Particularly well represented are Cubism, Expressionism, the Bauhaus and Surrealism. The collection owns masterpieces of artists like Pablo Picasso, Ernst Ludwig Kirchner, Joan Miró, Wassily Kandinsky and Barnett Newman. The design of the building, despite its large size, allows for the display of only a small part of the collection, and the displays are therefore changed at intervals.

Pablo Picasso, 1909, Femme assise (Sitzende Frau)

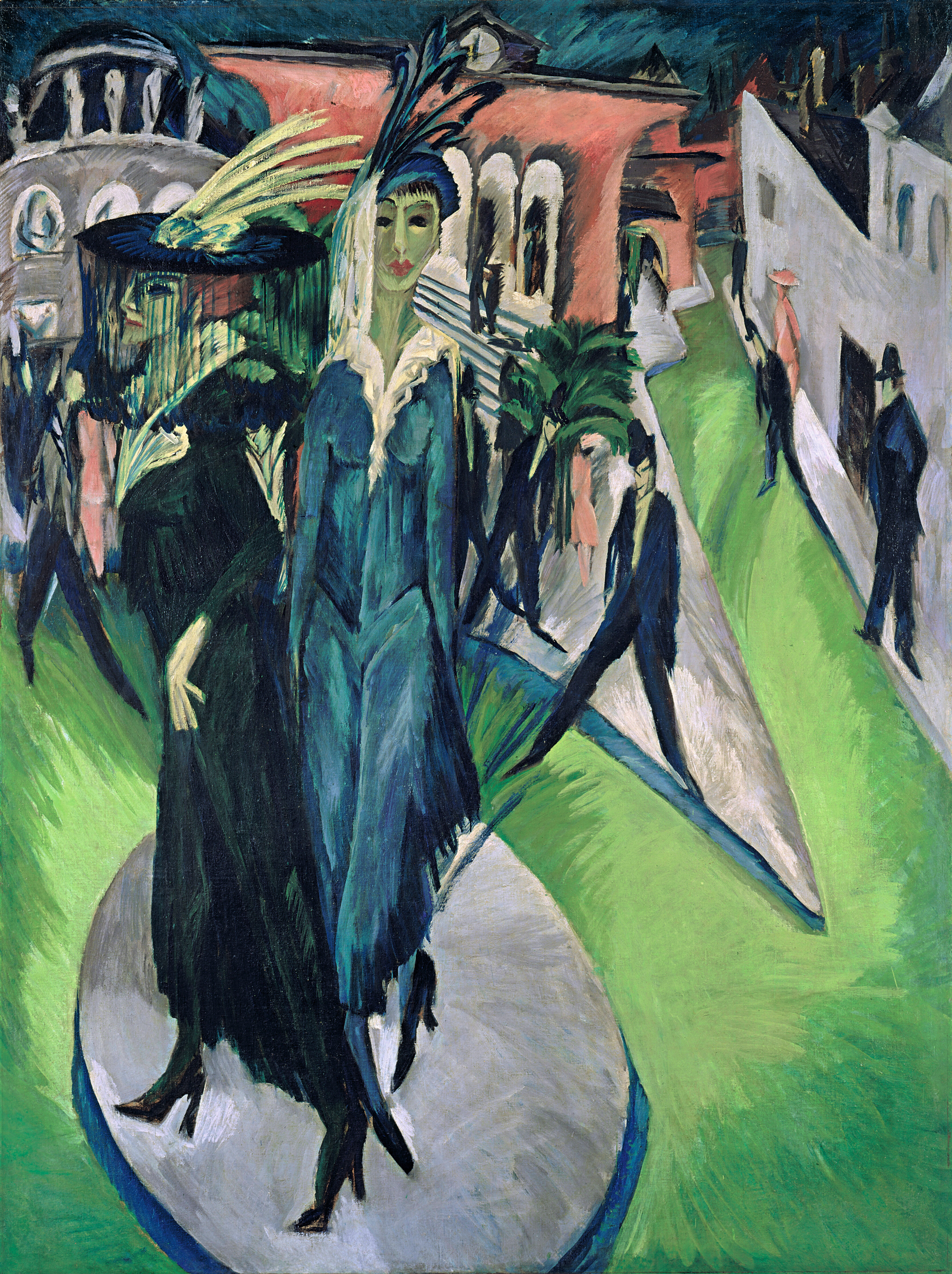
Ernst Ludwig Kirchner, 1914, Potsdamer Platz

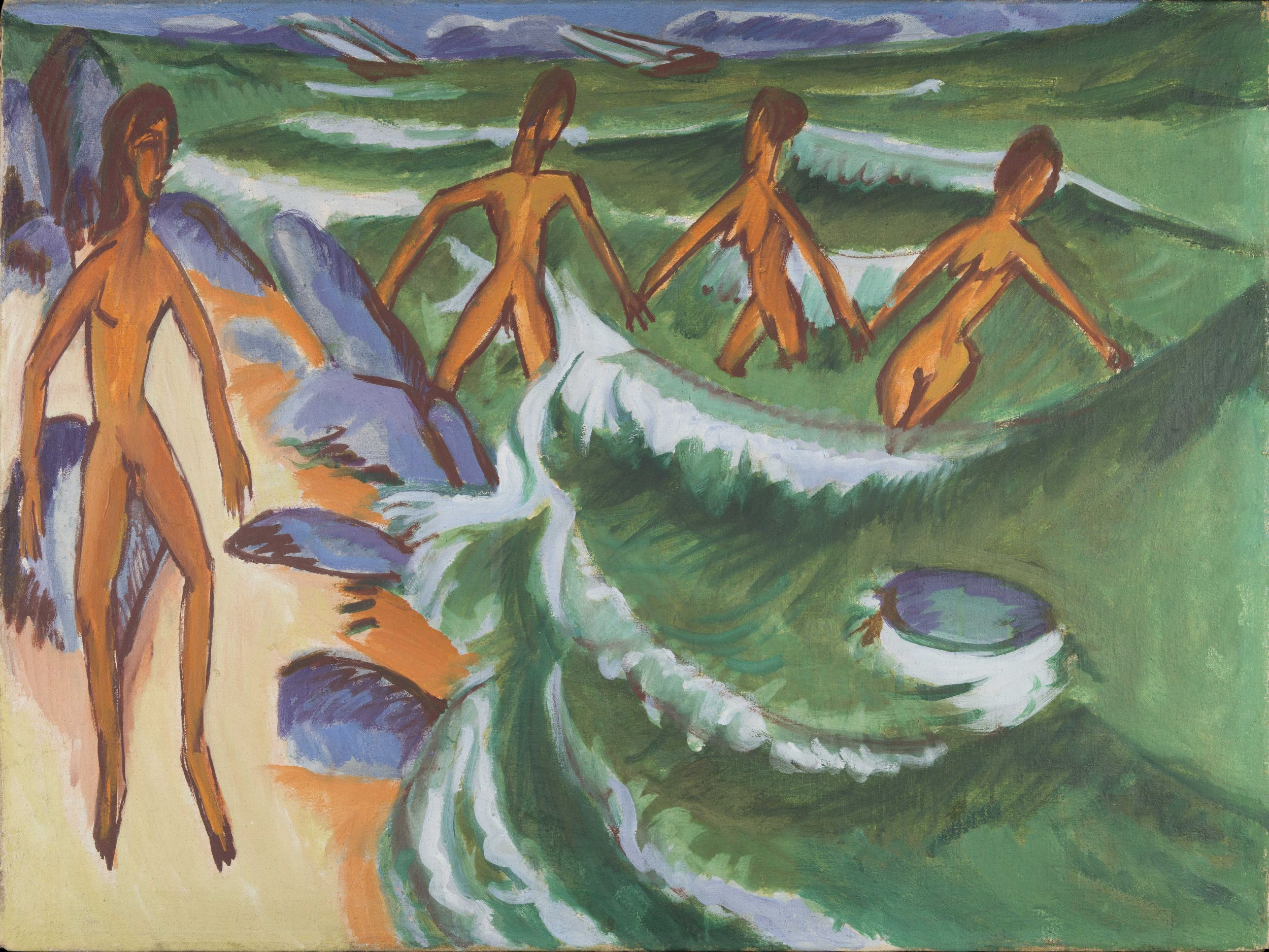
Ernst Ludwig Kirchner, 1913, Badende am Strand

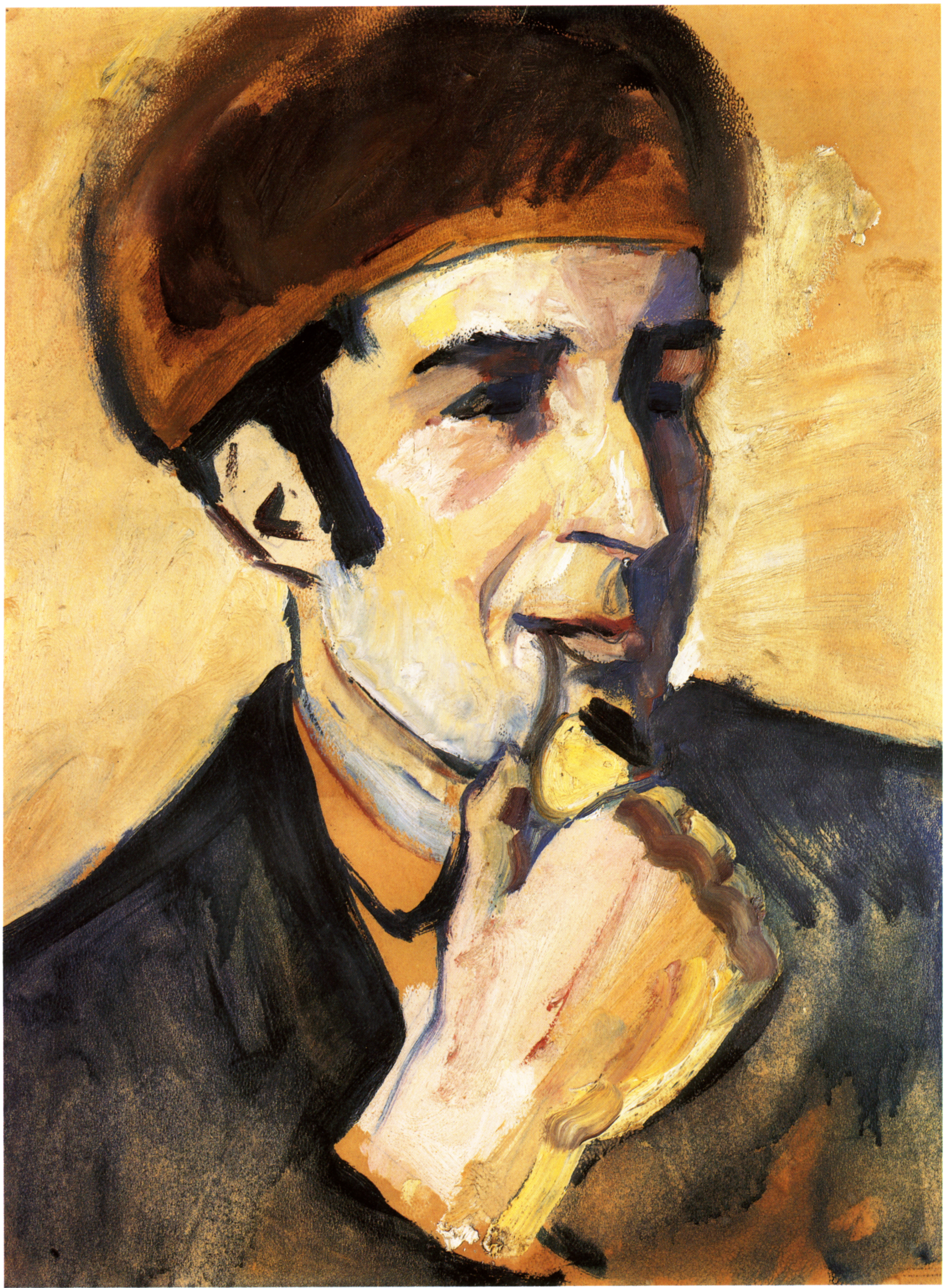
August Macke, 1910, Portrait of Franz Marc

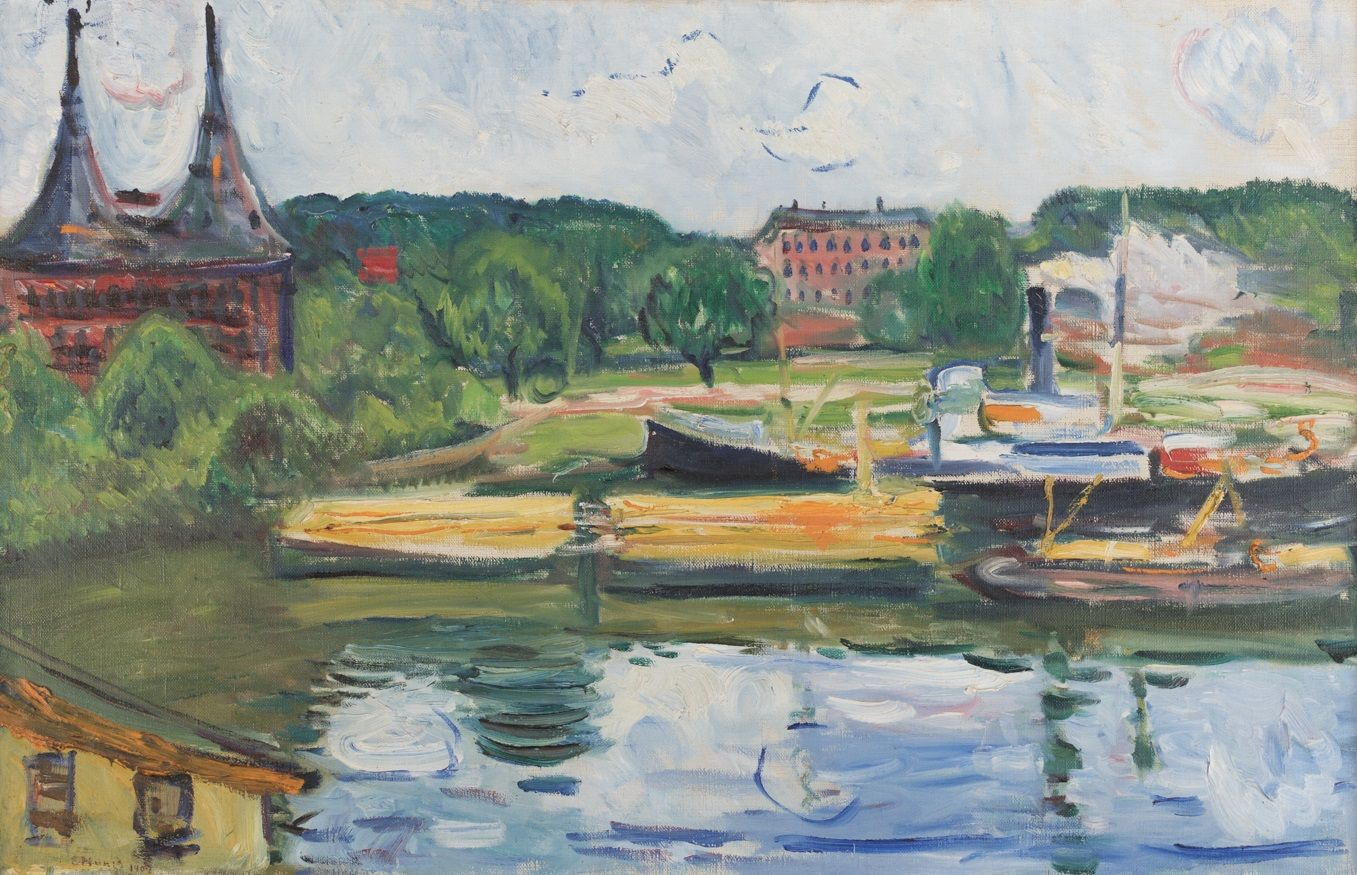
Edvard Munch, 1907, Lübecker Hafen mit Holstentor

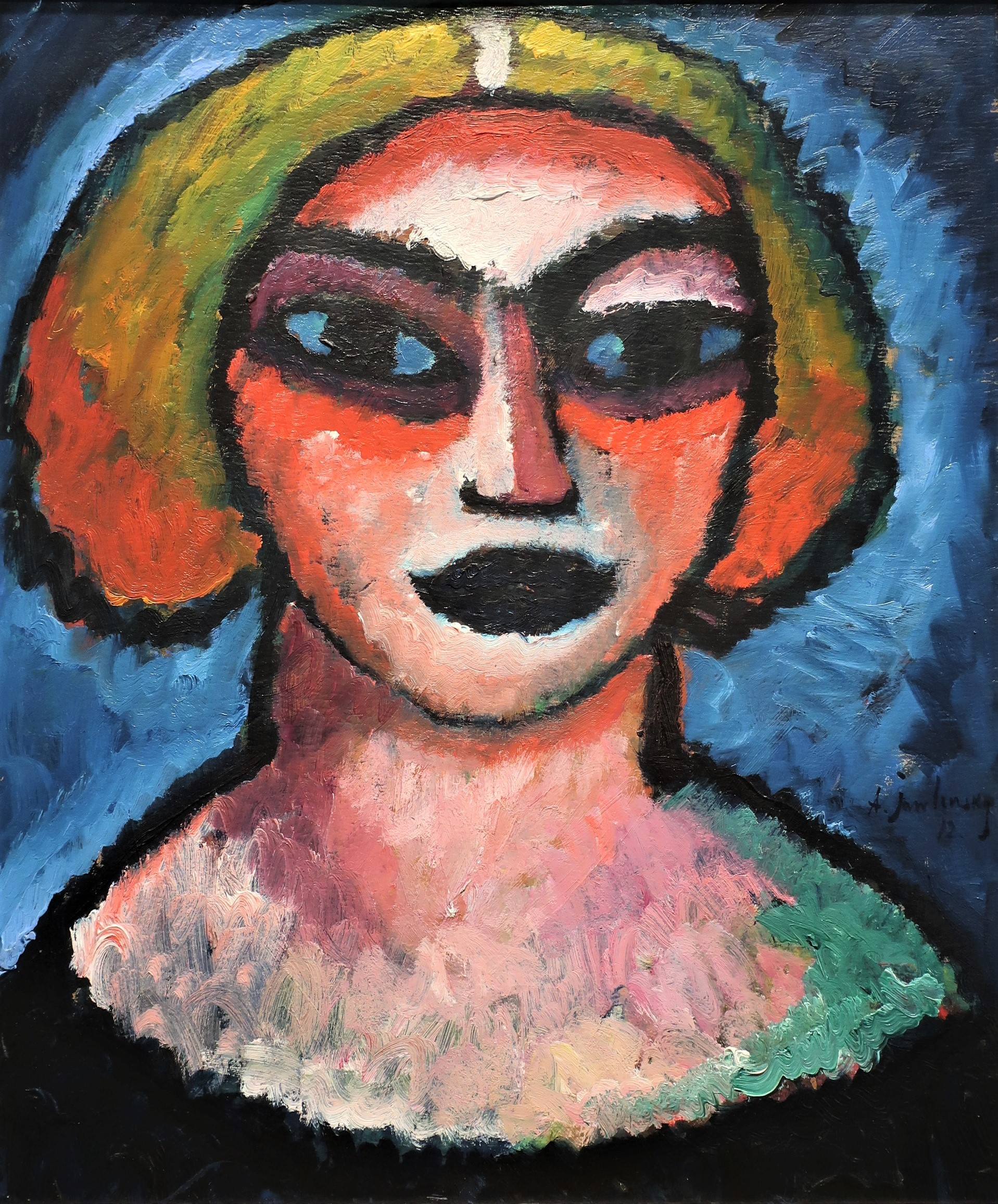
Alexej von Jawlensky, 1912, Frauenkopf

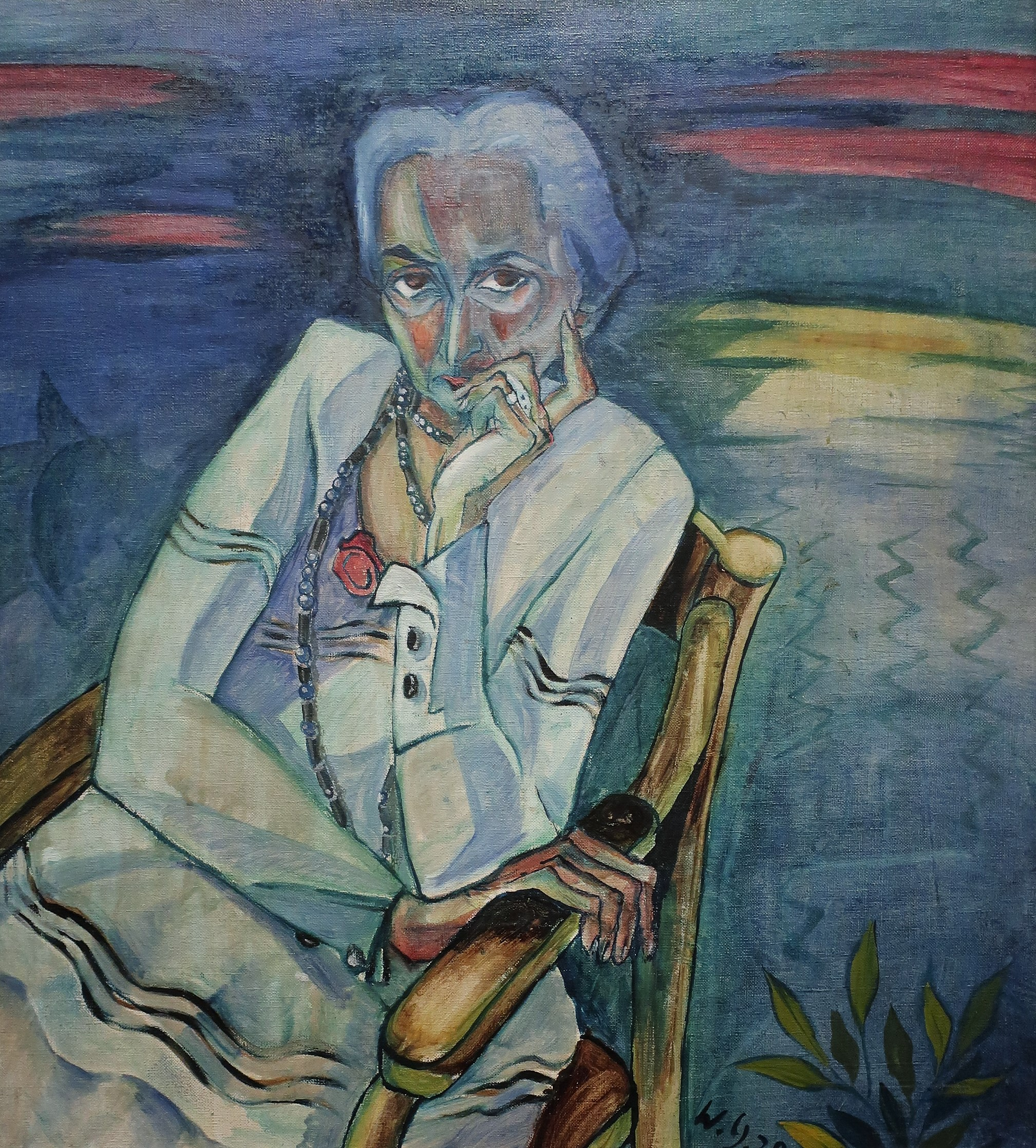
Walter Gramatté, 1920, Porträt Rosa Schapiere

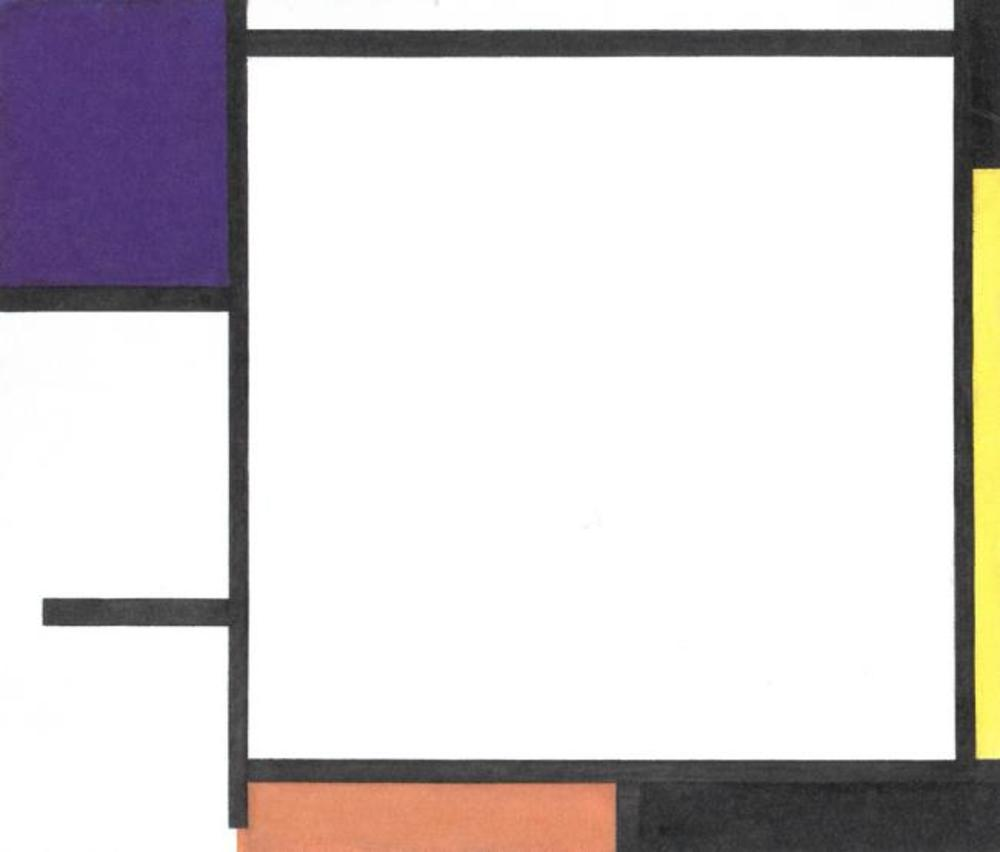
Piet Mondriaan, 1922, Composition with blue, black, yellow and red

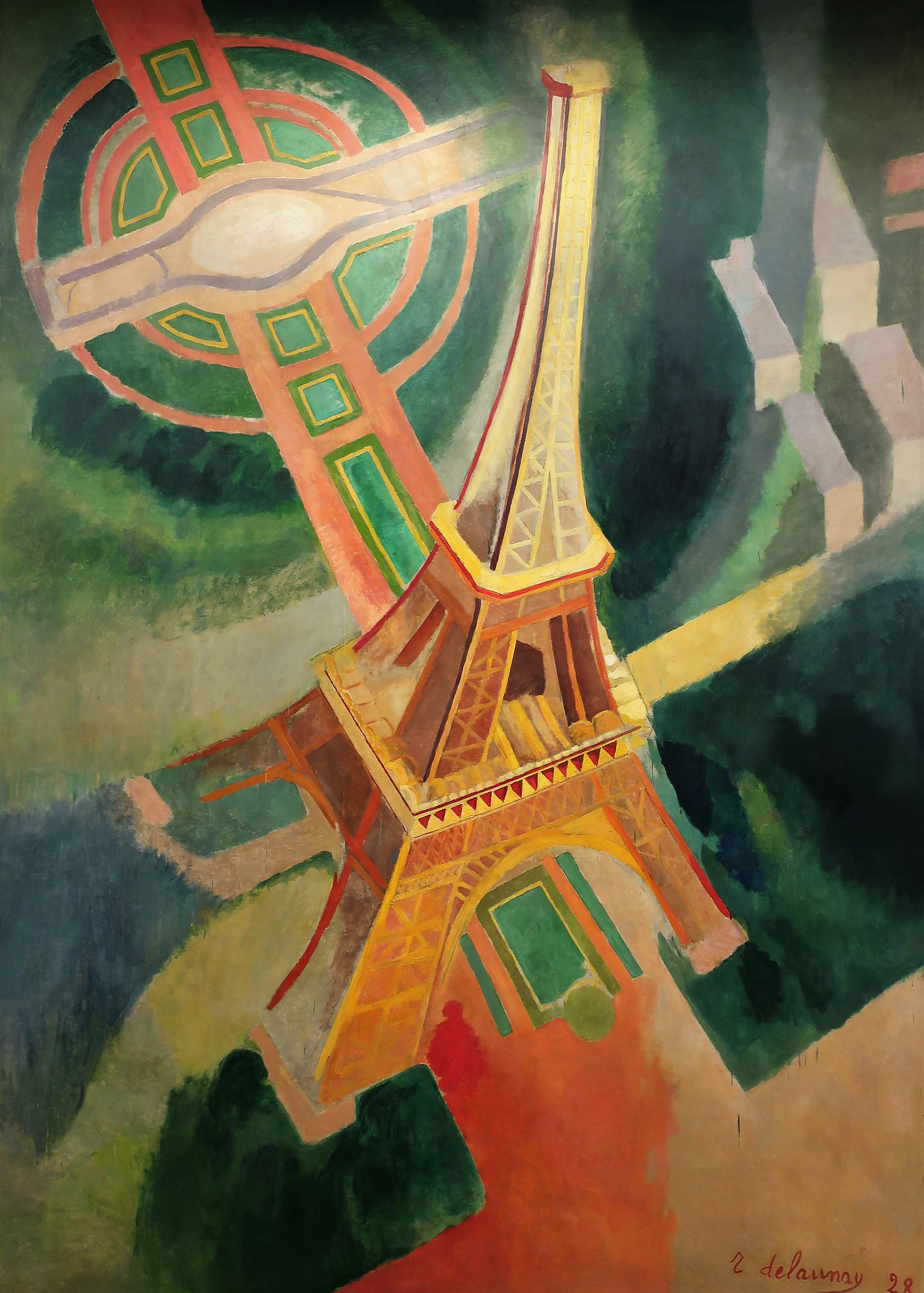
Robert Delaunay, 1928, Eifelturm

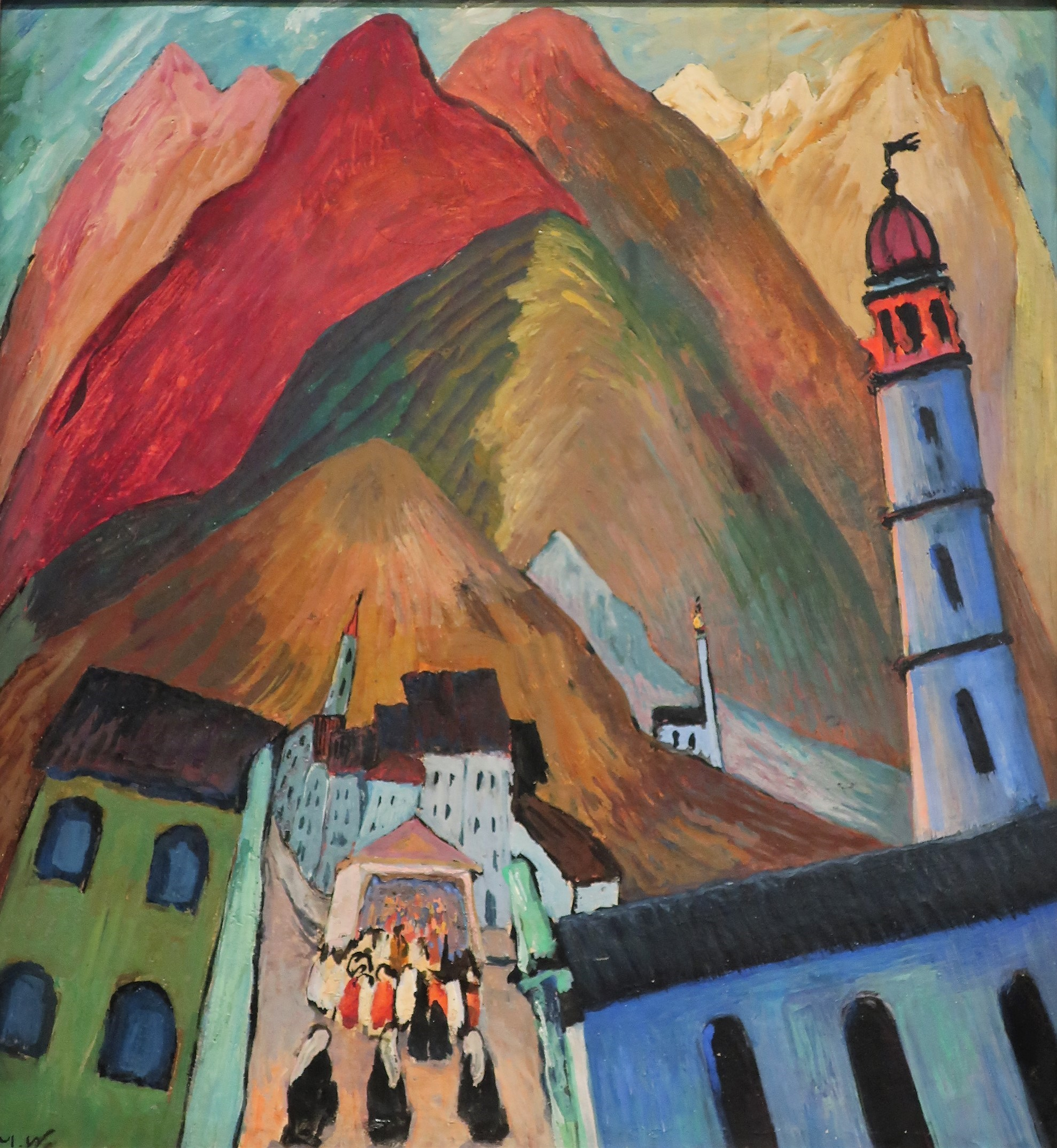
Marianne von Werefkin, 1924, Prozession bei Ascona

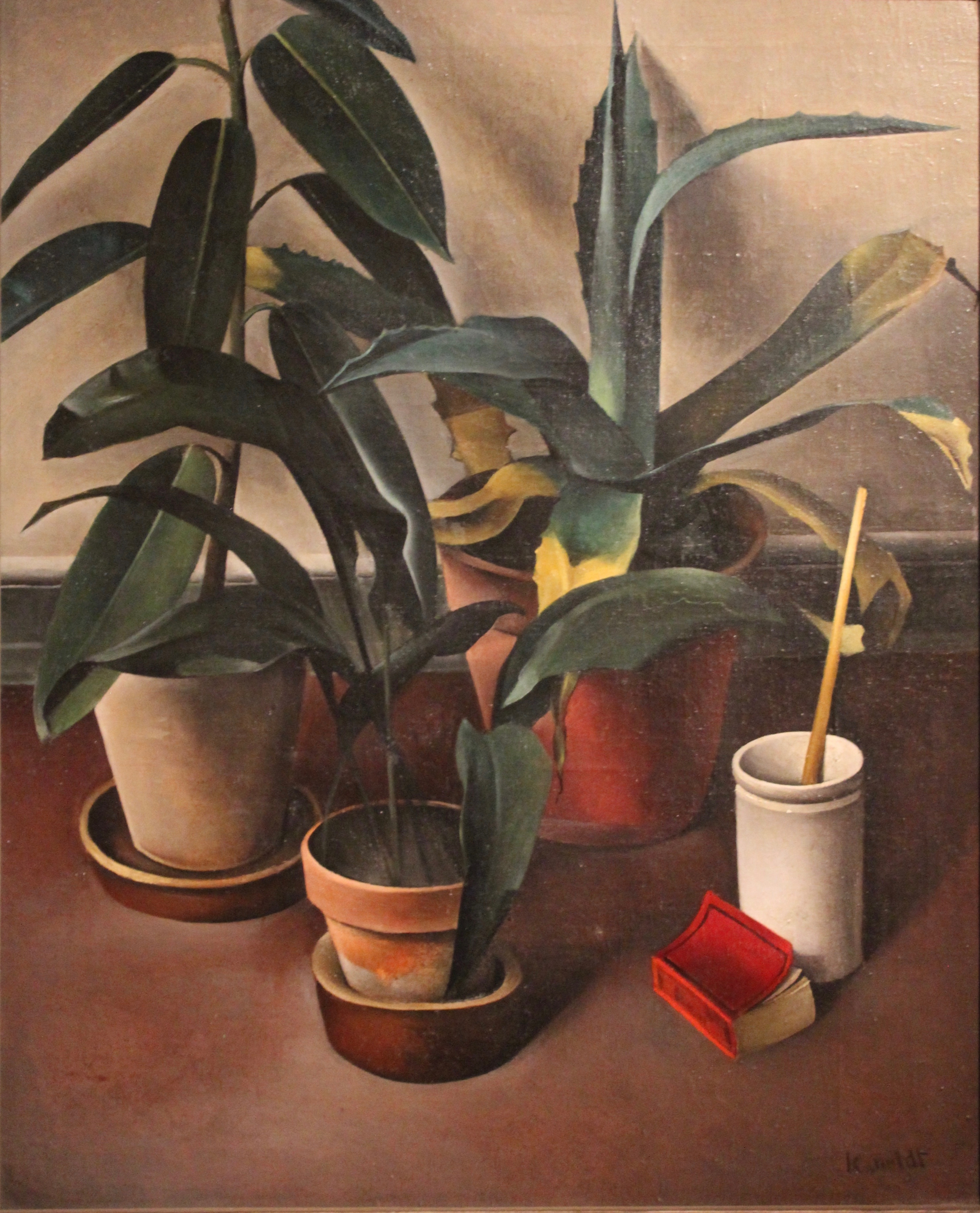
Alexander Kanoldt, 1926, Still Life I

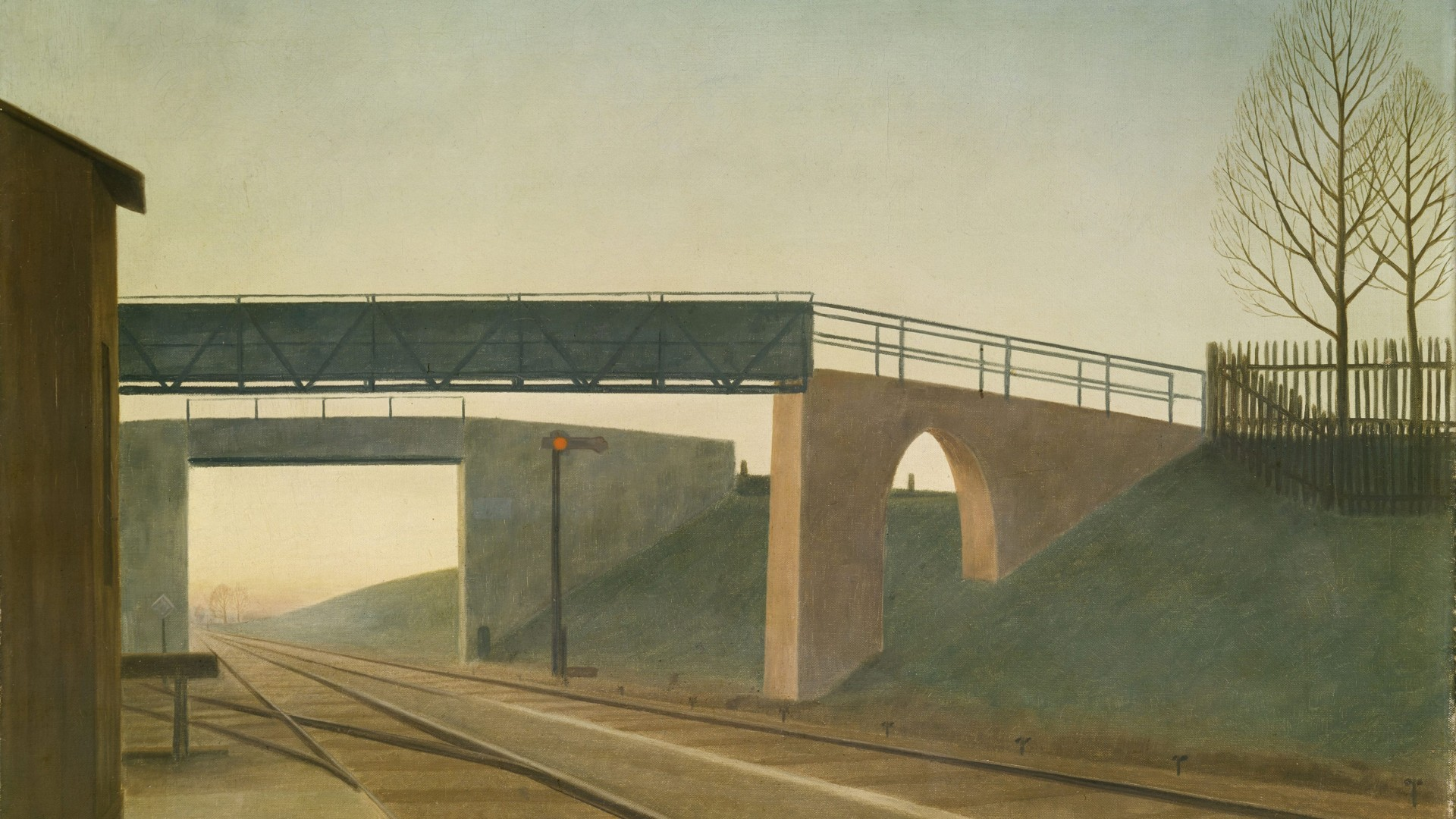
Georg Schrimpf, 1932, Railway Crossing

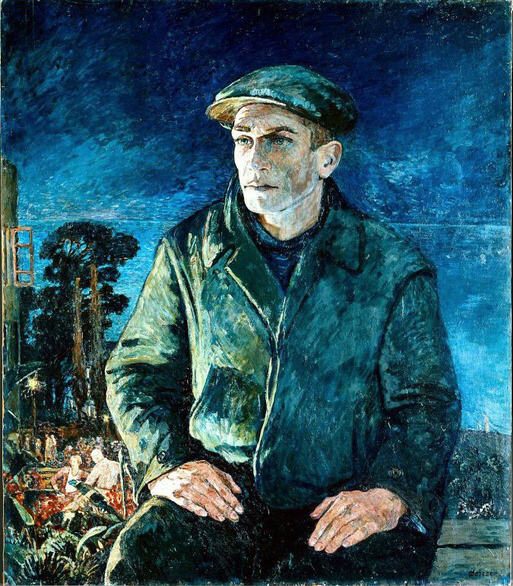
Heinrich Vogeler, 1936, Deutscher Stachanowarbeiter

== Permanent art installations ==
The Neue Nationalgalerie's ceiling, constructed as a grid of black-painted steel beams, has been used as an exhibit surface in itself for Installation for the Neue Nationalgalerie, an installation of long lines of LCD displays by artist Jenny Holzer in 2001, which continuously scrolled abstract patterns down their length.

The Neue Nationalgalerie's terrace provides a particularly prominent space for large-scale pieces of sculpture from the 20th century. Permanently installed sculptures include Gudari (1957) by Eduardo Chillida, Polis (1968) by Joannis Avramidis, the kinetic metal sculpture Vier Vierecke im Geviert (1969) by George Rickey, Three Way Piece No.2: The Archer (1964–65) by Henry Moore, Têtes et Queue (1965) by Alexander Calder, and Berlin Block Charlie Chaplin (1978) by Richard Serra. In 2003, with the permission of the Barnett Newman Foundation, a fourth edition of the sculpture Broken Obelisk (1963) by Barnett Newman was cast and temporarily installed in front of the museum. In 2011, Thomas Schütte's work Vater Staat (2010) was donated by Nicolas Berggruen and installed on the terrace. Many other pieces of sculpture – by artists from Auguste Renoir to Ulrich Rückriem – are on permanent display in the museum's garden.

== Directors ==
- 1967–1974: Werner Haftmann
- 1974–1975: Wieland Schmied
- 1975–1997: Dieter Honisch
- 1999–2008: Peter-Klaus Schuster
- 2008–2020: Udo Kittelmann
- 2020:-2022 Joachim Jäger
- Since 1 January 2022: Klaus Biesenbach

== Images ==
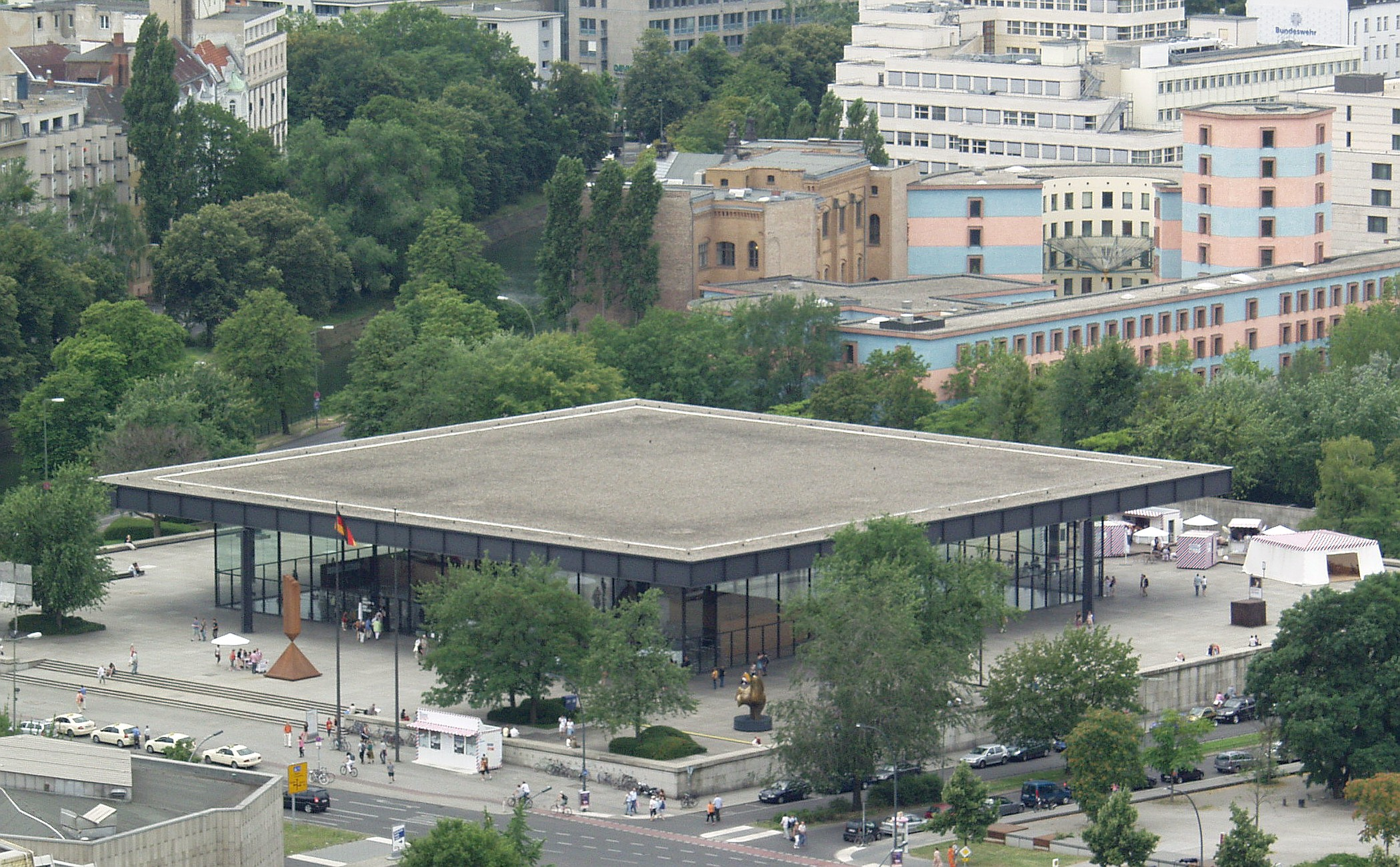
A view from above

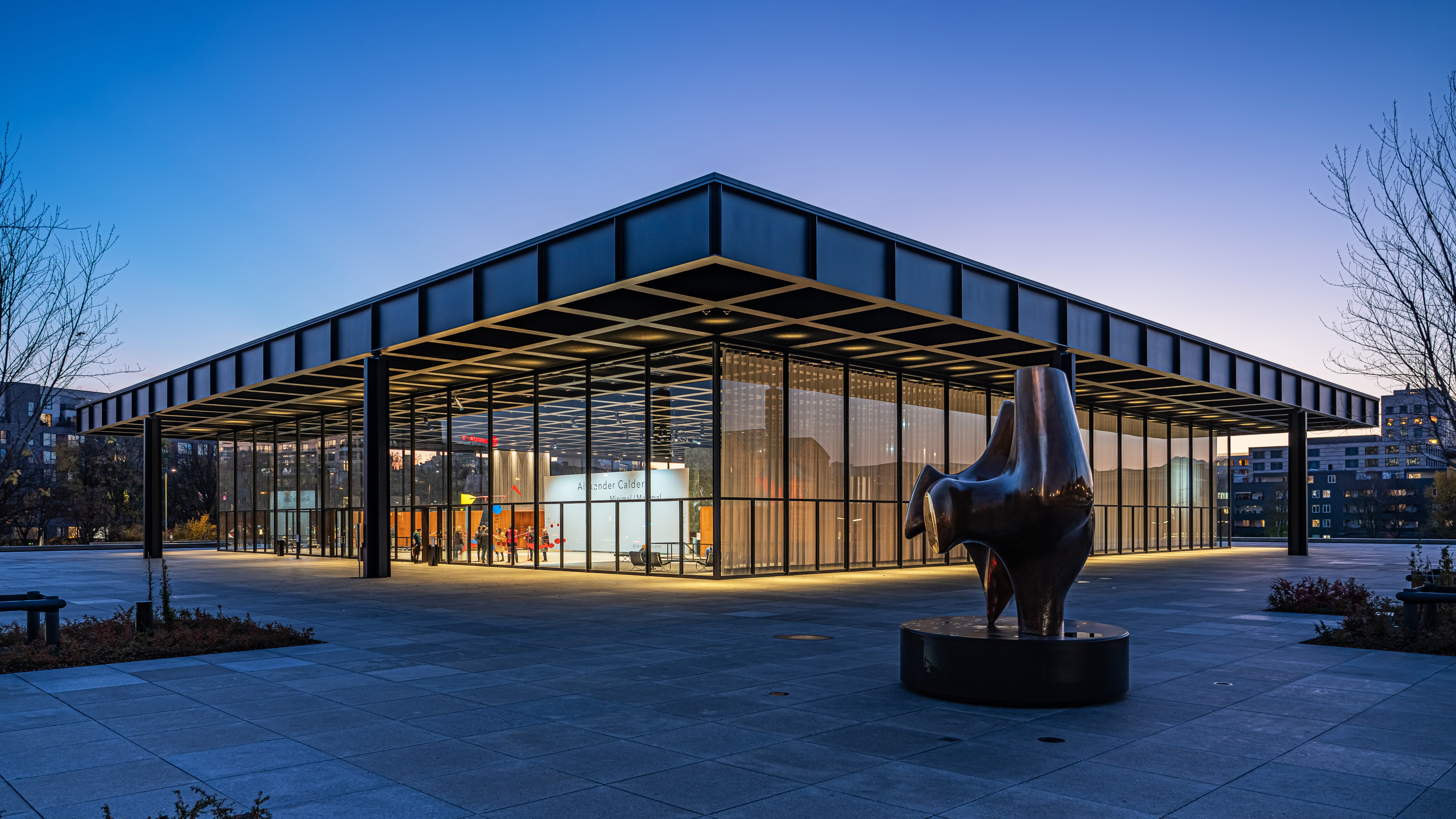
Entrance side with Three Way Piece No. 2: The Archer

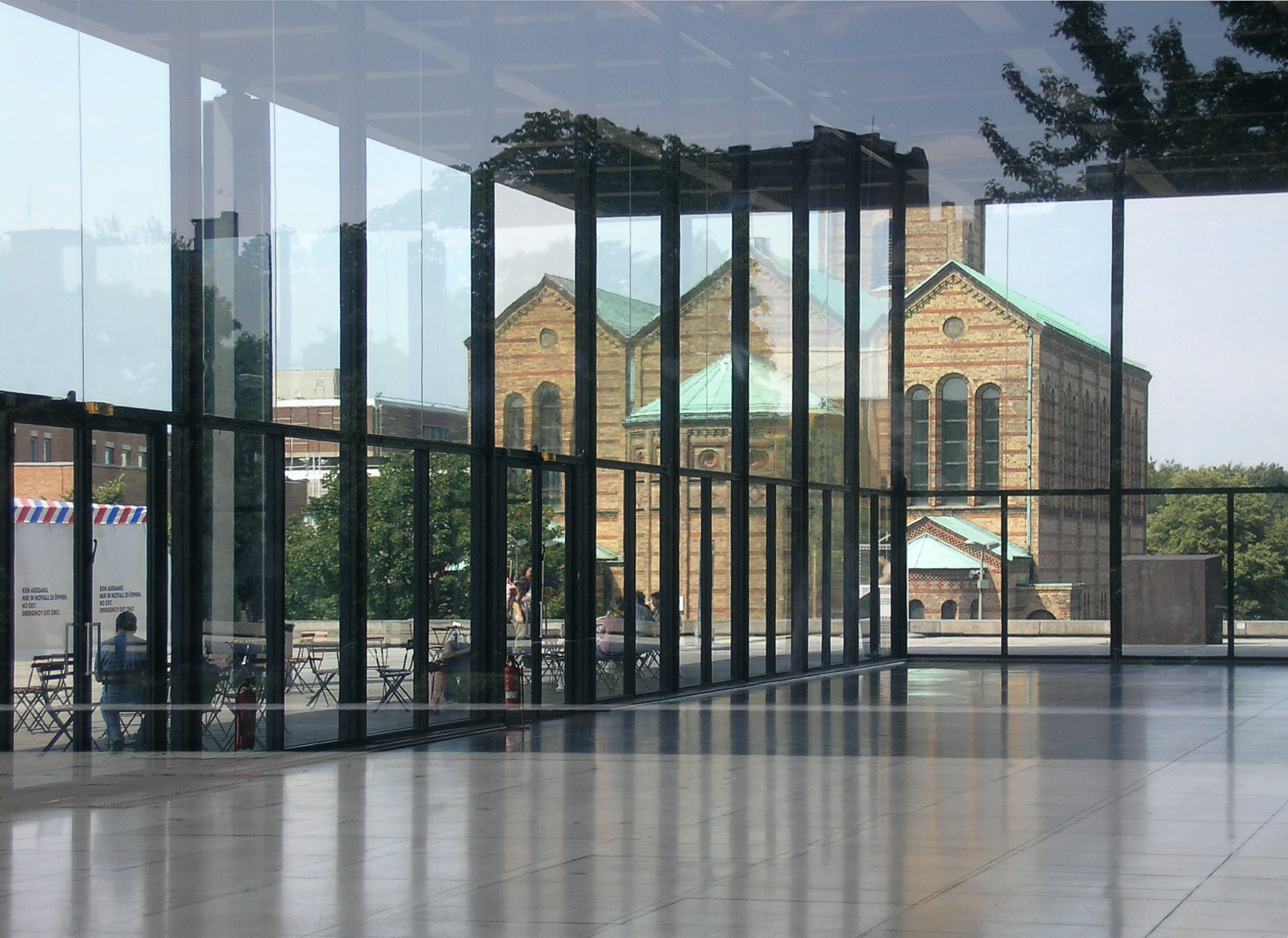
Interior view

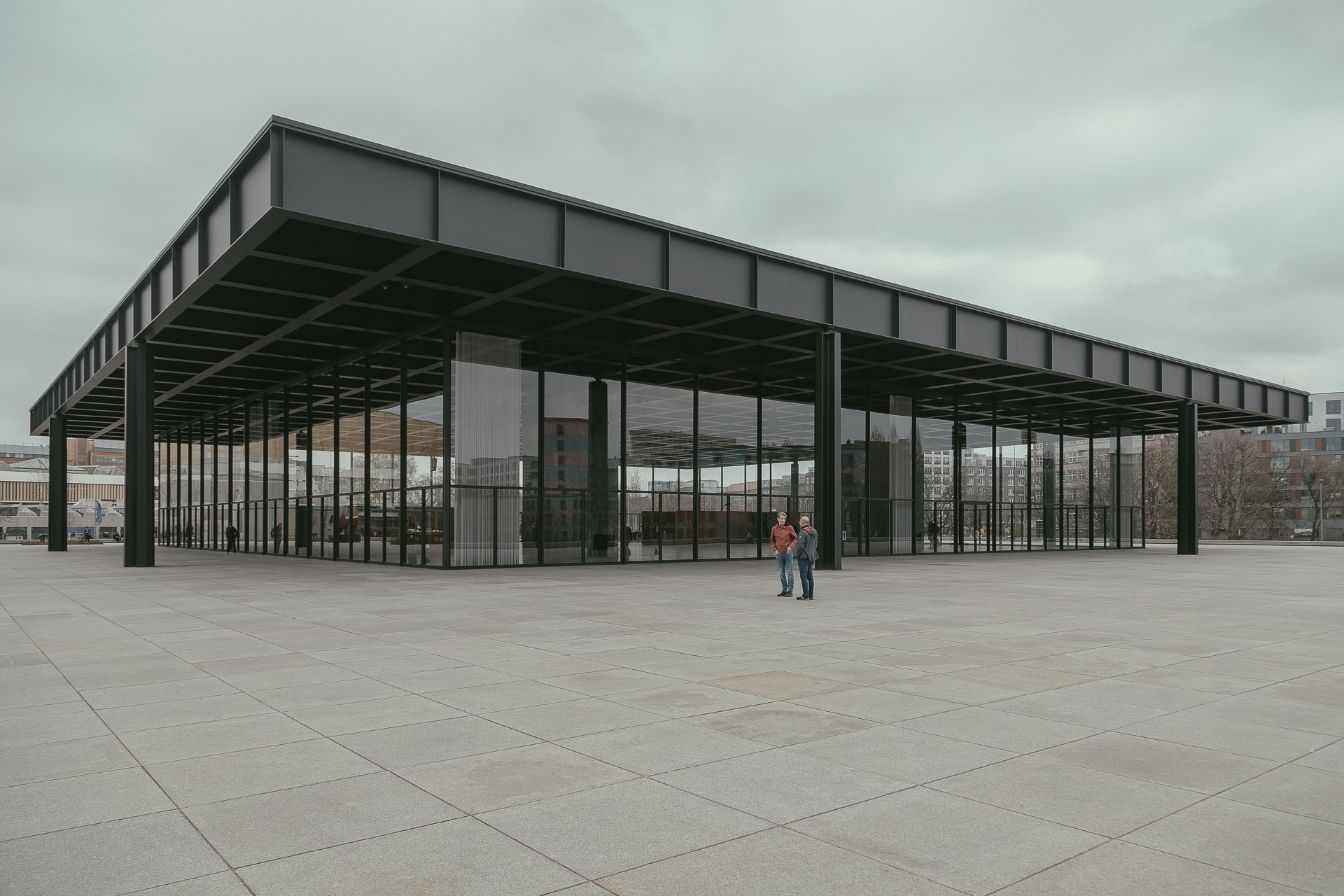
Museum western façade after restoration

== See also ==
- Alte Nationalgalerie
- List of art museums
- List of museums in Berlin
- List of museums in Germany
- List of national galleries
