= Sophie Carmen Eckhardt-Gramatté =

Russian musician (1899–1974)

Sophie Gramatté
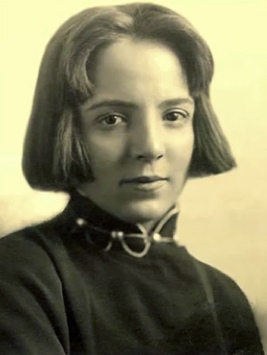
- Photo of Sophie Gramatté (taken in the 1920s)
- Born: 6 January 1899
- Died: 2 December 1974 (aged 75)
- Occupations: Violinist, Pianist

Sophie Carmen Eckhardt-Gramatté (Russian: Софи Кармен Экхардт-Граматте; 6 January 1899 [O.S. 25 December 1898] in Moscow, Russia – 2 December 1974 in Stuttgart, Germany) was a Russian-born Canadian composer, virtuoso pianist, and violinist.

== Biography ==
=== Early life ===
She was born as Sofia (Sonia) Fri[e]dman-Kochevskaya in Moscow, where her mother worked as a governess in the household of Leo Tolstoy. She began to learn piano in 1904 and wrote her first piano compositions in 1905. She studied at the Conservatoire de Paris from 1908 to 1913, where her teachers included Alfred Brun and Guillaume Rémy for violin, S. Chenée for piano, and Vincent d'Indy and Camille Chevillard for composition. She made her début in 1910, and her first composition, an Etude de Concert, was published in Paris that year. She moved to Berlin in 1914, where she studied violin with Bronisław Huberman; by 1919 she had undertaken several concert tours of Western Europe, on which she performed her own works.

=== Career ===
In 1920, she married the painter Walter Gramatté in Berlin, and from 1924 to 1926 lived in Spain, where Pablo Casals was her mentor. During this time she wrote her first piano concerto. She toured with Edwin Fischer in Germany in 1925.

Following her husband's death in 1929, she toured the US, performing to critical acclaim her first piano and violin concertos in an American debut with Leopold Stokowski in Philadelphia and Frederick Stock in Chicago. Upon her return to Berlin in 1930 she gave up her performing career to devote herself to composition.

In 1934, she married the journalist and art historian Ferdinand Eckhardt. From 1936 she pursued further lessons in composition with Max Trapp in Berlin at the Berlin Academy of Arts. She and her husband moved to Vienna in 1939 where she continued to compose. In 1945 she became a member of the group that reopened the Austrian branch of the International Society for Contemporary Music. The couple left Vienna in 1953, and settled in Winnipeg, Canada, where she continued to compose. In Winnipeg she taught several violin students out of a private studio, including violinist Gwen Thompson.

=== Later life and death ===
In 1970 she was awarded an honorary doctorate from Brandon University, Manitoba, as well as the title 'professor' by the Viennese minister of education. In 1974 she became the first Canadian composer to receive the Diplôme d’honneur of the Canadian Conference of the Arts. Also that year her life was the subject of a two-hour CBC documentary. Some of her music and old performances are included in Radio Canada International's Anthology of Canadian Music. A project that she had initiated to encourage young musicians to study and play contemporary music was only realised posthumously in 1976, with the first annual Eckhardt-Gramatté competition for the performance of Canadian music.

Eckhardt-Gramatté died in Stuttgart as a result of a car accident. Her legacy is preserved through the work of the Eckhardt-Gramatté Foundation. Several locations named in honour of Eckhardt-Gramatté or her husband Ferdinand Eckhardt were renamed when a 2023 article revealed Ferdinand's Nazism, which included a public oath of allegiance to Adolf Hitler and authoring several pro-Nazi articles.

== Compositions ==
As a composer, Eckhardt-Gramatté was largely self-taught. She composed more than 175 works. She learned a great deal from the virtuoso music she performed on both the piano and the violin, and her compositions – especially from the 1920s – reflect this. By the late 1930s her contrapuntal idiom had reached full maturity, and in the following decade her style moved towards neo-classicism and bitonality with some use of jazz idioms. In 1950, with the Piano Sonata no.5, she began to adopt serialism, and by 1955 her use of metric manipulation showed similarities to that of Olivier Messiaen and Boris Blacher. She retained a lifelong admiration for the music of Johann Sebastian Bach – the ending of her 1955 Concerto for Orchestra reworks the prelude from his Partita in E major – and, like Bela Bartók, she frequently used the interval of a fourth as a structural device. Her music is dark, dense and dramatic, with forward drive. She admired the First Viennese School, but her brand of counterpoint is individual and its dissonance owes much to the post-Romantics. Despite her use of modern techniques, she remained a Romantic in spirit. In addition to writing music, she developed a piano teaching method, the 'E-gré Piano Technique', whose basis is the use of rotary movement.

Her compositions include: two symphonies; a concerto for orchestra; a triple concerto for trumpet, clarinet, bassoon, strings, and timpani; three piano concertos; two violin concertos; a piece for two pianos and orchestra; a bassoon concerto; various chamber works; as well as numerous instrumental solos for piano and violin.

Most of her compositions are published by Plangere Editions.

=== Selected works ===
- Lagrime for viola (or cello) and piano, E. 61 (1928)
- Procession funèbre, Symphonic Poem, E. 74 (1928)
- Violin Concerto No. 1, E. 59bis (1929)
- Piano Concerto No. 1 in A minor, E. 60 (1925–31)
- February Suite for violin and piano (1934)
- String Quartet No. 1, E. 103 (1938)
- Symphony No. 1 in C major, E. 104 (1939)
- String Quartet No. 2 "Hainburger-Quartett" (1943)
- Duo for viola and cello, E. 109 (1944)
- Piano Concerto No. 2 in E-flat major, E. 117 (1946)
- Concertino for string orchestra, E. 119 (1947)
- Triotino, "Nicolas-trio" for violin, viola and cello, E. 114 (1947)
- Triple Concerto for trumpet, clarinet and bassoon, E. 123 (1949)
- Bassoon Concerto, E. 124/25 (1950)
- Markantes Stück for piano and orchestra (1950)
- Violin Concerto No. 2, E. 127 (1951)
- Concerto for orchestra, E. 137 (1954)
- Duo concertante for flute and violin, E. 138 (1956)
- Duo concertante for cello and piano, E. 146 (1959)
- String Quartet No. 3, E. 149 (1964)
- Symphony-Concerto for piano and orchestra (Piano Concerto No. 3), E. 154 (1967)
- Piano Trio, E. 157 (1968)
- Symphony No. 2 "Manitoba" (1970)
- Konzertstück for cello and orchestra, E. 163 (1974)
- Six piano sonatas (recorded by Marc-André Hamelin) (the last also a suite.)
- 10 Caprices for solo violin

== Recordings ==
- The six caprices and other works for piano. Megumi Masaki, piano. Winnipeg : The Eckhardt-Gramatté Foundation, 1991. Worldcat record
- The six piano sonatas = Les six sonates pour piano. Marc-André Hamelin, piano. Toronto : Centrediscs, 2011. Worldcat record
- S.C. Eckhardt-Gramatté 100 : a centenary celebration. Multiple performers, including the composer. [Winnipeg] : Eckhardt-Gramatté Foundation, 1999. Worldcat record
- 13 Canadian caprices = 13 caprices Canadiens. Jasper Wood, violin. [Canada] : Analekta?, 1999. Worldcat record

== See also ==
- Music of Canada
- List of Canadian composers
