= Megumi Masaki =

- Born: 9 September 1963 (age 62); Tokushima, Japan
- Genres: New music multimedia and interdisciplinary works
- Occupations: pianist, educator, arts administrator, conductor
- Instruments: piano, audio/visual and computer effects
- Years active: 1993-present
- Label: Centrediscs
- Website: megumimasaki.com

Megumi Masaki OM (born 9 September 1963) is a Japanese-Canadian pianist, multimedia artist, educator, researcher, arts administrator, conductor, and curator.

== Early life and education ==
Masaki was born in Tokushima, Tokushima Prefecture, Japan. She began her piano studies in Winnipeg with Alice Nakauchi and continued with Leonard Isaacs. She received her Bachelor of Music (Hons.) in Piano Performance from Western University in London, ON, studying with Ronald Turini and Peter Katin. Her graduate degree in Piano Performance and Literature was also from Western University, and her Master's thesis, A Survey of Toru Takemitsu's Solo Piano Music, was supervised by Dr. Jack Behrens. Post-graduate work was at the Royal College of Music in London, UK, where she received an A.R.C.M. (Associate of the Royal College of Music) Diploma in Piano Performance, and an Advanced Studies Diploma in Piano Performance under the instruction of Kendall Taylor, with Philip Wilkinson as her academic supervisor.

== Career ==
=== Academic and Creative ===
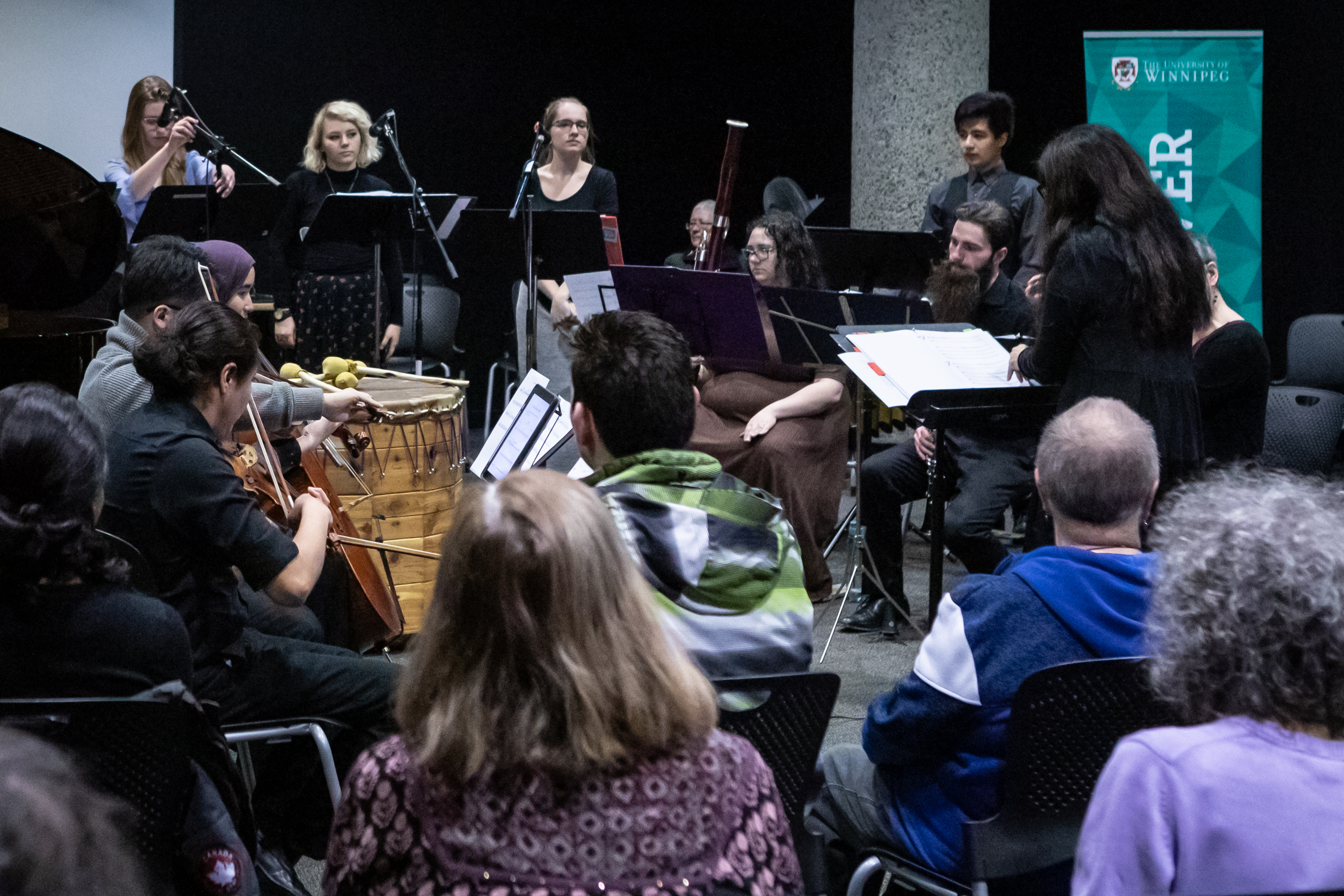
Brandon University New Music Ensemble under the direction of Megumi Masaki, Jan 2020

Since 2006, Masaki has been a member of the piano faculty at the School of Music at Brandon University in Brandon, MB, Canada, and she was made a full professor in 2014. In 2007 Masaki founded the educational outreach project "Masaki's Rising Stars of Brandon University" in partnership with rural arts associations, schools, and personal care homes. Masaki received the Brandon University Alumni Association's Award for Excellence in Teaching in 2010.

In addition to piano instruction and pedagogy, Masaki directs Brandon University School of Music's New Music Ensemble and its New Music Festival. In 2019, in collaboration with Brandon University Indigenous Peoples' Centre Knowledge Keeper Barb Blind, Masaki founded the BU Indigenous New Music Festival, featuring contemporary classical music by Indigenous composers.

Masaki is also on faculty at the Casalmaggiore International Festival, a solo and chamber music summer school and festival in Casalmaggiore, Italy; the Banff Centre for the Arts and Creativity in Banff, AB, Canada; and Chetham's International Piano Summer School in Manchester, UK. She is artistic director of the Eckhardt-Gramatté National Music Competition. In 2016, she was a Musician in Residence at the Banff Centre for Arts and Creativity, specializing in interactive electronics and video and serving as an installations mentor., and in 2022 she served on the faculty of the centre's Evolution: Classical 2022 artist development program.

Masaki is a member of the Advisory Council for the Canadian Music Centre's Prairie Regional Office and the board of the Canadian New Music Network. She has served as a jury member for the Manitoba Arts Council, the Ontario Arts Council, the Canada Council, and was an academy delegate and performer for the Canadian Academy for the Recording Arts and Sciences (the JUNO Awards) in 2016.

In July 2022, Masaki was appointed to the Order of Manitoba and declared a Fellow of the Royal Society of Canada as a leading interpreter of new music and as an innovator who reimagines the piano, the pianist, and the performance space.

In April 2023, Masaki was appointed Director of Music at the Banff Centre for Arts and Creativity, to lead the vision and implementation of Music programming at the centre, developing and nurturing emerging artists, and guiding and deepening music programming,

In January 2026, Masaki was awarded the Violet Archer Lifetime Achievement Award by the Canadian Music Centre, Prairie Region. The award was a recognition of her extraordinary contributions to Canadian music and her lasting impact on generations of artists.

=== Performance ===
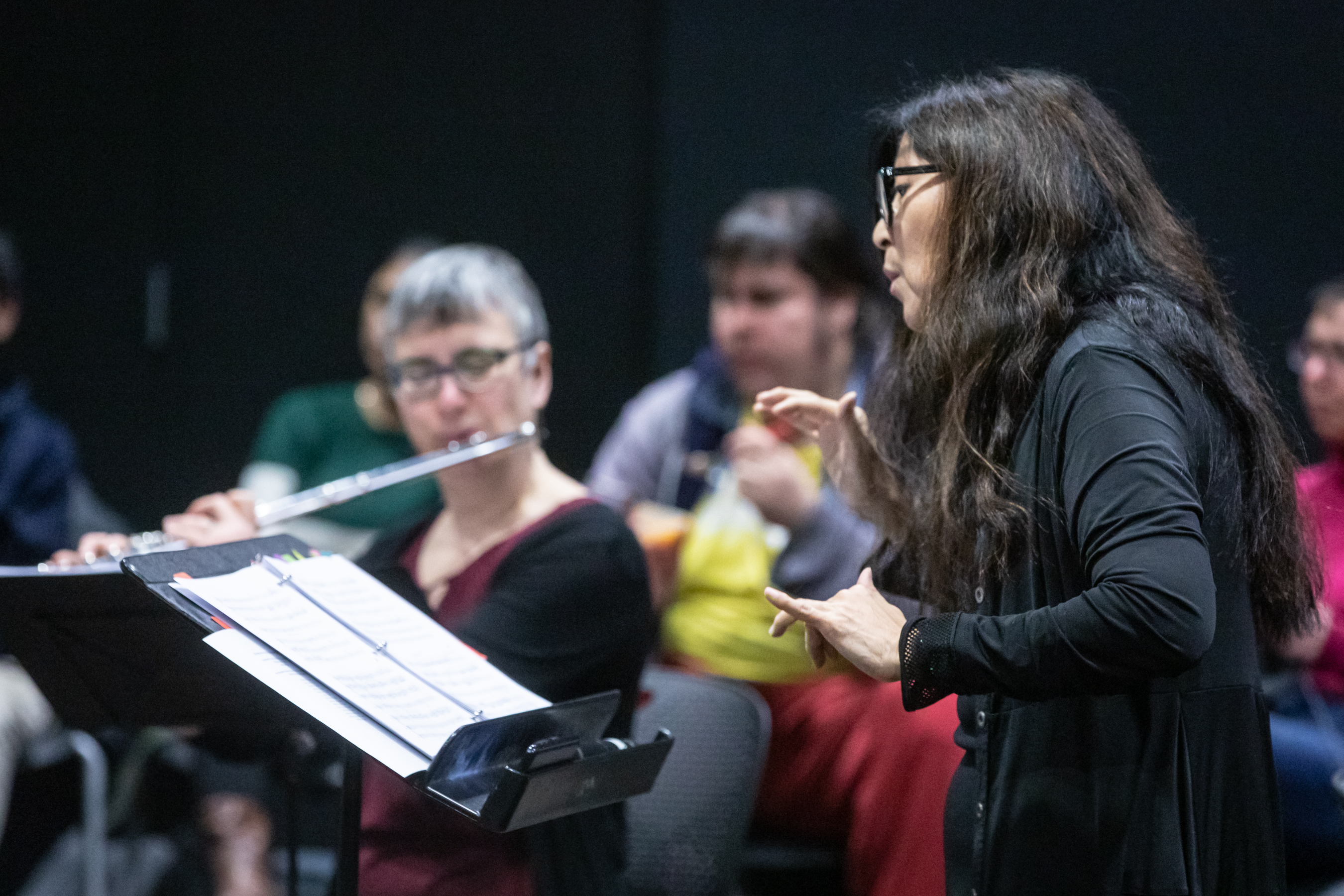
Megumi Masaki conducts the Brandon University New Music Ensemble, Jan 2020

Masaki frequently collaborates with composers, visual artists, writers, computer scientists, and choreographers on interdisciplinary projects involving new technologies. She is a member of the Windsor, ON performance collective Noiseborder Ensemble, and of Slingshot-Kidõ, an interdisciplinary collective based at the University of Hartford, CT. The Slingshot Trio and the Noiseborder Ensemble contributed works to Listening Rooms at the Sonorities Belfast Festival in April 2022. Masaki has premiered many works for piano, chamber ensembles, and multimedia. As a solo artist she has commissioned pieces from notable Canadian composers such as Nicole Lizée (Kubrick Etudes for piano and glitch (soundtrack and film); Hitchcock Etudes for solo piano and film), Brent Lee (Immaterial Los Angeles for solo piano; Agency and Structure for piano and fixed video; Ferrovia for piano and interactive video), Keith Hamel (Touch for piano and live electronics; Corona for piano, interactive electronics and interactive visuals; Piano Games for piano and new computer game), and T. Patrick Carrabré (Orpheus Drones for piano and electronics; Orpheus (2) for piano, electronics and poetry by Margaret Atwood; Orpheus (1) for piano, toy piano, Roli keyboard, video, and text by Margaret Atwood). As a chamber musician she has collaborated with the Penderecki String Quartet, the Gewandhaus Orchestra soloists, Shauna Rolston, and Koh Gabriel Kameda, among others. She has concertized across North America, Europe, and Asia, including such venues as the National Arts Centre Ottawa, London's Royal College of Music, the Dark Music Days Festival in Reykjavik, IS, and Coronet Concert Hall in Okazaki, JP.

Masaki works particularity with the repertoire of Sophie Carmen Eckhardt-Gramatté including recording Eckhardt-Gramatté's piano compositions and her works for violin and piano duo (with Oleg Pokhanovski), publishing a critical performance edition of the composer's Piano Caprices, and appearing on film as a historical researcher and pianist in the film “Appassionata: The Extraordinary Life and Works of Eckhardt-Gramatté”, produced by Paula Kelly.

In November 2021, Masaki collaborated with Yellowknife composer Carmen Braden and filmmakers Ben McGregor and Caroline Cox in a project called Hearing Ice that documented the freeze-up of northern lakes, and how climate change is impacting ice. The project produced a multimedia piece entitled ICE IS WATER IS ICE IS, which involves live piano performance, visuals, projections, and sounds of ice. The piece was performed by Masaki, Ken Steen, and Gene Gort at the 27th International Symposium on Electronic Art in Barcelona, Spain in June 2022.

== Recordings ==
Audio
Performers	Title	Album details
Megumi Masaki, piano	Megumi Masaki plays Eckhardt-Gramatté: The Six Piano Caprices and Other Works for the Piano	Release date: 1993; Producer: Paul V. Wichert; Distributor: Eckhardt-Gramatté Foundation/Centrediscs; Format: CD
Megumi Masaki, piano	S. C. Eckhardt-Gramatté: "Piano Caprice No. 1" in Canada's Living Music: The Spirit of Independence/ Musique vivante canadienne: Un air de liberté	Release date: 1994; Distributor: Canadian Music Centre; Format: CD
Megumi Masaki, piano Oleg Pokhanovski, violin	The Complete Works for Violin and Piano Duo by Eckhardt-Gramatté Volume 1	Release date: 2009; Producer: Theresa Leonard, Banff Centre Music and Sound Studio; Distributor: independent; Format: CD
Megumi Masaki, piano	Nicole Lizée: "Hitchcock Etudes" in Bookburners	Release date: 2011; Distributor: Centrediscs; Format: CD, DVD, vinyl, streaming audio
Megumi Masaki, piano	MUSIC 4 EYES&EARS. Compositions by Keith Hamel, T. Patrick Carrabré, Nicole Lizée	Release date: 2017; Distributor: Canadian Music Centre/Centrediscs; Format: CD, streaming audio
Megumi Masaki, piano, multimedia	Transformation: Interactive Works for Piano by T. Patrick Carrabré, Keith Hamel, Bob Pritchard	Release date: 2022; Distributor: Canadian Music Centre/Centrediscs; Format: CD, streaming audio

Video
Role	Title	Details
pianist	Stars on Ice: The Piano Bar	Release date: 2003; Director/Producer: First National German Public Television; Distributor: German National TV; Format: VHS, DVD
pianist, researcher	Appassionata: The Extraordinary Life and Music of Sophie Eckhardt-Gramatté	Release date: 2006; Director/Producer: Paula Kelly, Buffalo Gals Productions; Distributor: Moving Images Distribution; Format: DVD
pianist, documentary subject	New Music: The Pianist	Release date: 2018; Director/Producer: G Street Media, Inc.; Distributor: Bell MTS Stories from Home; Format: TV
