= Walter Gramatté =

German artist

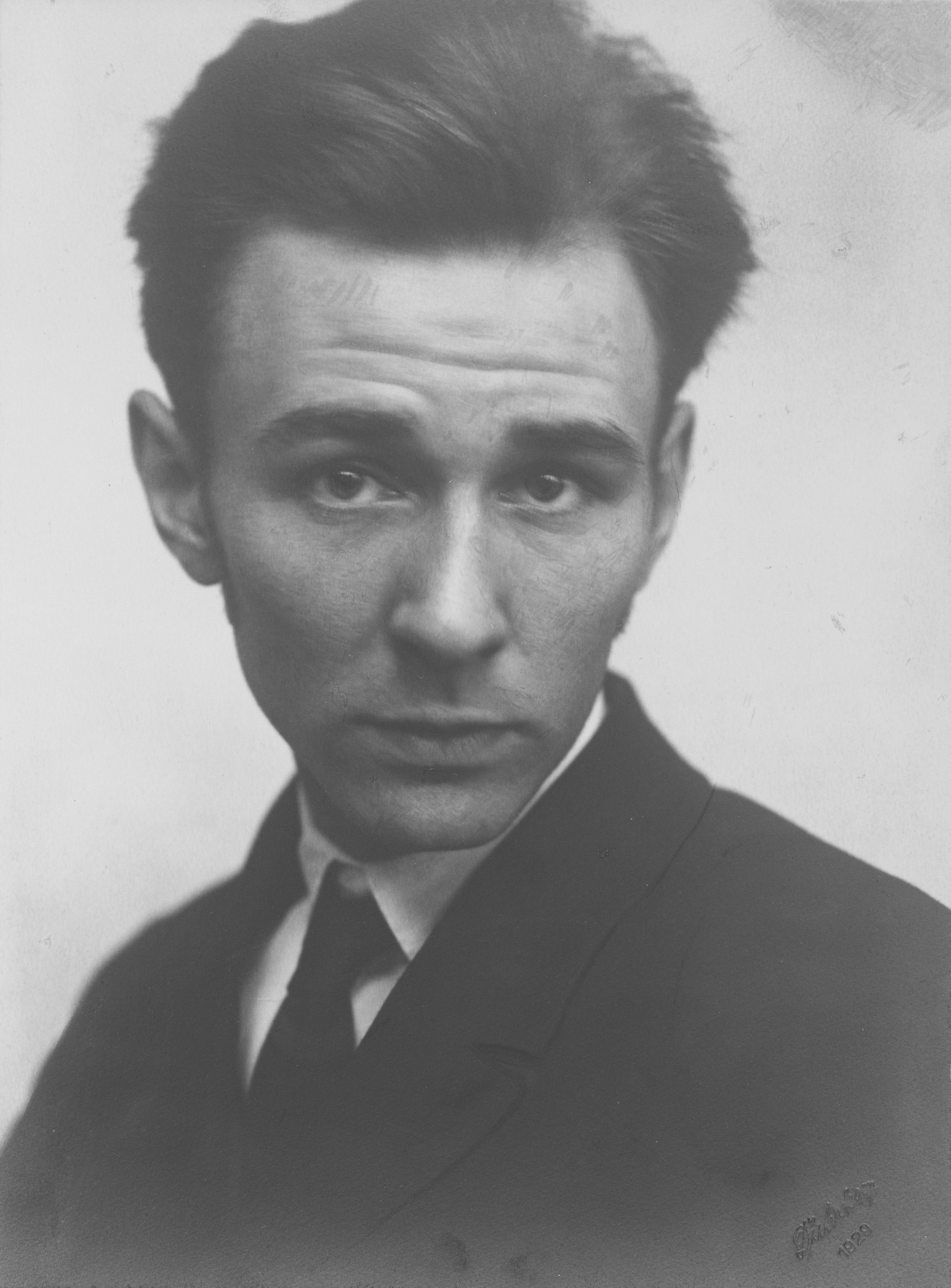
Walter Gramatté (Minya Diez-Dührkoop, 1929)

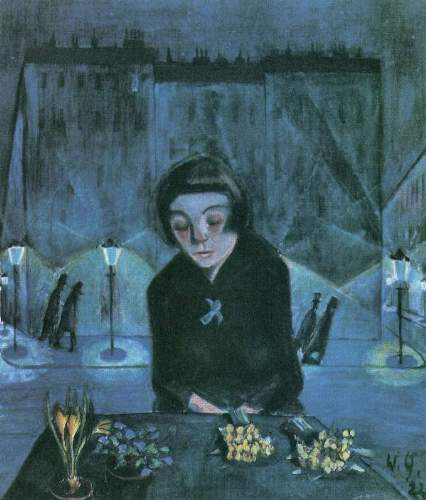
Tired Flower Girl (Sonia, his wife), 1922

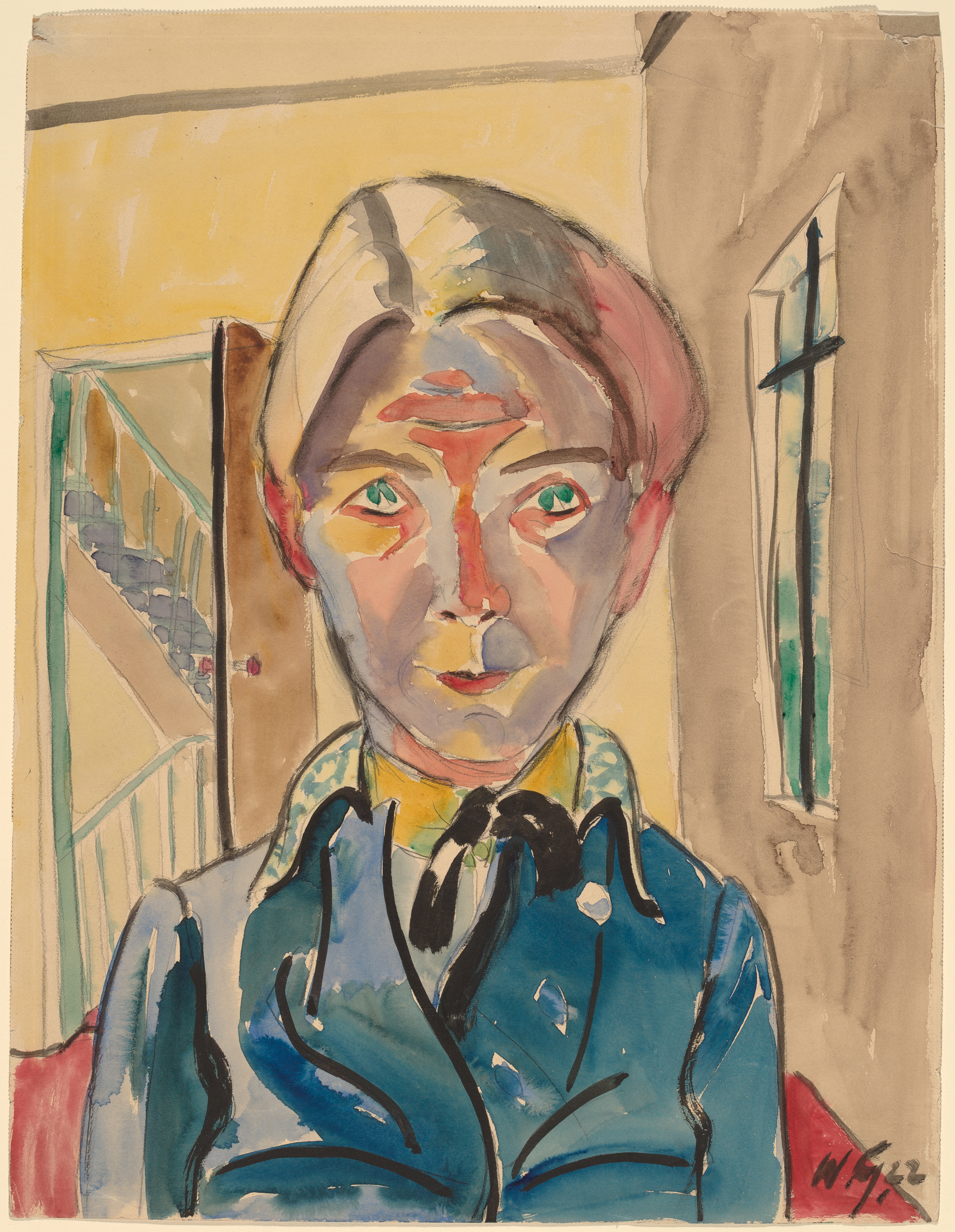
Self-Portrait in front of Stairs (Selbst vor Treppe), 1922, watercolor over graphite, Gift of Ruth Cole Kainen, National Gallery of Art

Walter Gramatté (8 January 1897 in Berlin – 9 February 1929 in Hamburg) was a German expressionist painter who specialized in magic realism. He worked in Berlin, Hamburg, Hiddensee and Barcelona. He often painted with a mystical view of nature. Many of his works were inspired by his experiences in the First World War and his illness.

== Biography ==
His father was a baker. He enlisted at the beginning of the war, but his poor health often exempted him from combat duty. His studies were mostly at the Kunstgewerbeschule (Arts and Crafts school) in Berlin. He opened his own studio in 1917.

In 1920, he married the Russian pianist, Sonia Fridman and became associated with Die Brücke, a group of Expressionist artists.

Despite his weak health, he travelled extensively, visiting France, Italy and Spain. He spent a great deal of time at the spa in Hiddensee and was hospitalized on several occasions, dying on 9 February 1929 of intestinal tuberculosis. His grave monument was designed by his friend, Karl Schmidt-Rottluff.

His works were classified as "Degenerate art" by the Nazi government in 1933 and were not exhibited again until after the war. He was the inspiration for the painter "Catell", a character in the novel Die Stadt hinter dem Strom by Hermann Kasack.

== Appreciation ==
His wife, Sonia, married again, to the art historian, Ferdinand Eckhardt (1902-1995), and lived in Canada as a renowned musician and composer. To remember her and her former husband, the Eckhardt-Gramatté Foundation was established in Winnipeg, Canada.

Walter Gramatté's personal papers are preserved in the German National Museum. A special exhibition of his paintings, titled Rediscovered: Walter Gramatté 1897-1929, took place in Hamburg's Ernst Barlach Haus from 26 October 2008 to 1 February 2009. This exhibition was organized by the Kirchner Museum in Davos, Switzerland and the Ernst Barlach Haus.

== Selected paintings ==
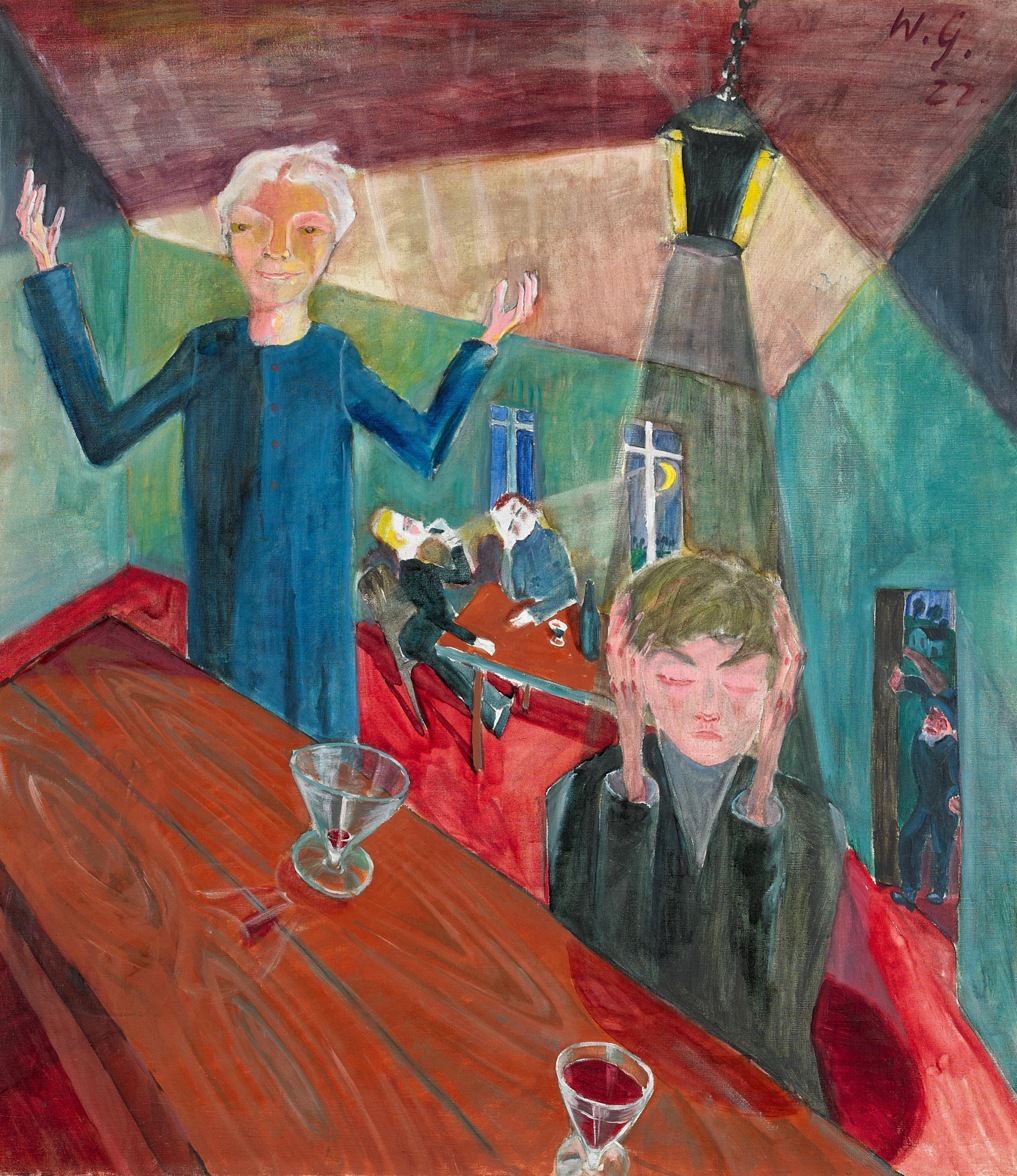
The Drinker

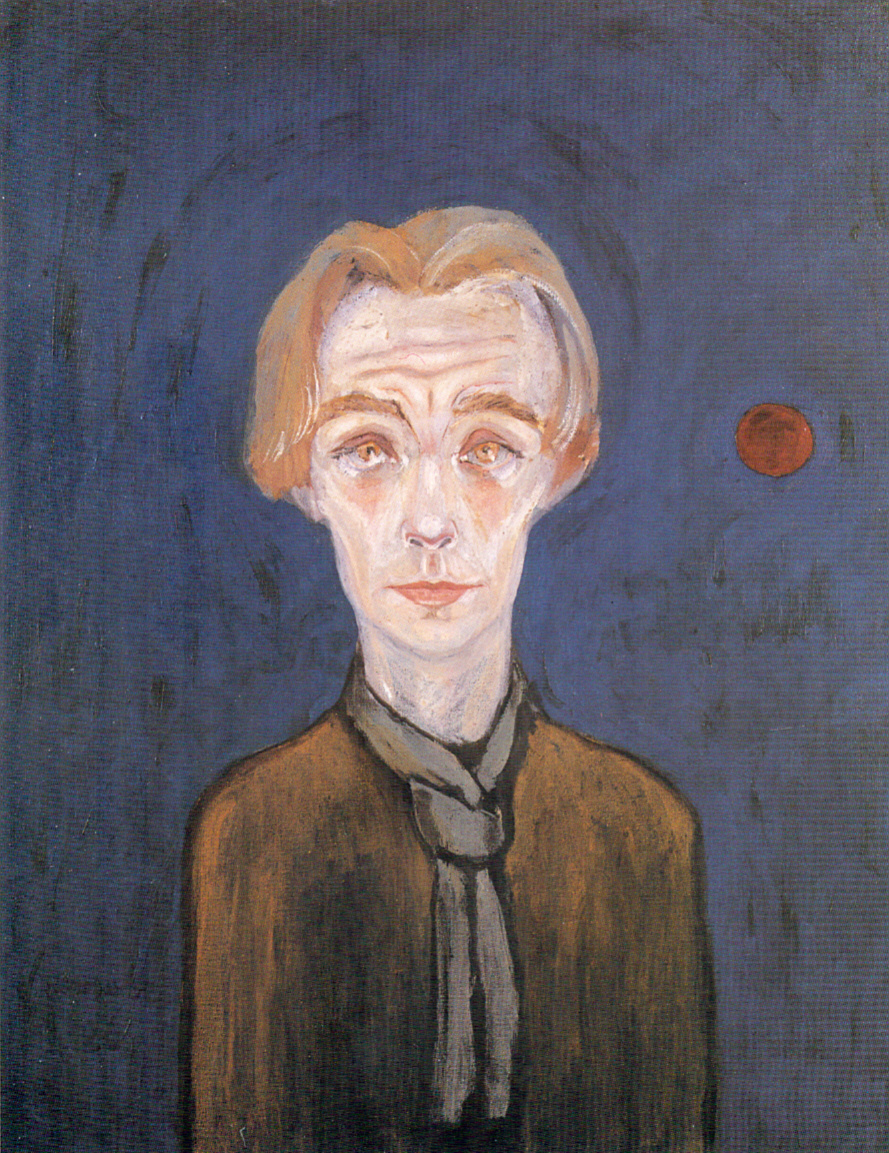
Self-portrait with Red Moon

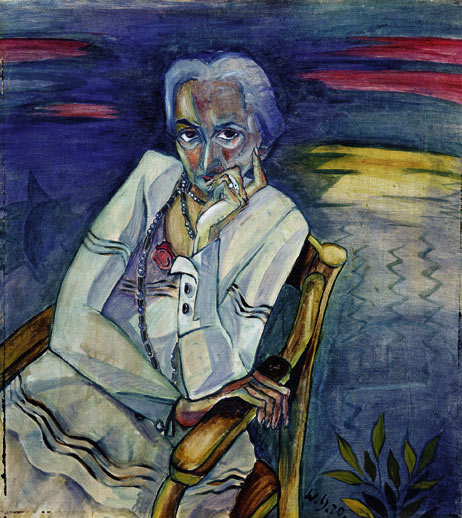
Portrait of Rosa Schapire

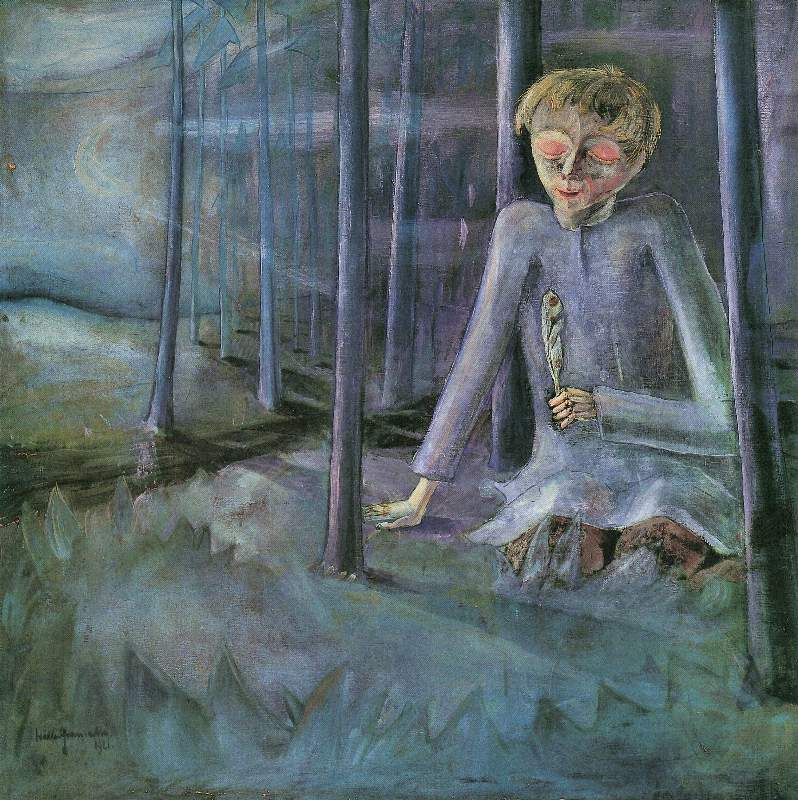
Dreaming Boy

Gramatté's work is displayed in the Germanisches Nationalmuseum (German National Museum) and the Neue Nationalgalerie, Berlin.

== Literature ==
- Claus Pese: Mehr als nur Kunst. Das Archiv für Bildende Kunst im Germanischen Nationalmuseum, Ostfildern-Ruit 1998 (Kulturgeschichtliche Spaziergänge im Germanischen Nationalmuseum, Bd.2), S.74-77.

== See also ==
- List of German painters
- Expressionism
