= Rosa Schapire =

Austro-Hungarian art historian

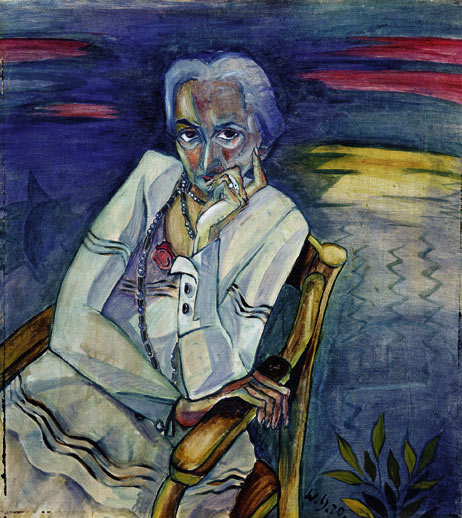
Rosa Schapire in a portrait by Walter Gramatté (1920)

Rosa Schapire (9 September 1874 – 1 February 1954) was an Austro-Hungarian-born art historian who lived in Germany and England. She was a model and art owner who gave early recognition to the Die Brücke group of artists.

== Life ==
Rosa Schapire was born in Brody, Galicia (now Ukraine) in 1874. Art historian Shulamith Behr notes in her Jewish Women's Archive article on Schapire that in 1948 Schapire "recalled her childhood memories of the nationalistic and religious divisions between the Poles and the Ruthenians (Ukra[i]nians) in Galicia, which was part of the Habsburg Empire. Here she declared that she was predestined towards internationalism through her birth, upbringing and fate." The daughter of wealthy Jewish parents, she was educated at home, because there were no appropriate educational facilities for her in Brody. In 1893, Schapire moved to Hamburg, which, Behr notes, "as with other regional centers during the Wilhelmine period ... was in the process of forging a sense of modern identity by mobilizing public institutions, traditions and culture." In 1897, she published "Ein Wort zur Frauenemanzipation" ("A word on women’s emancipation") in the journal Sozialistische Monatshefte, in which she argued that women would find freedom "in the society of the future, in the society of socialism." She was one of the first women to receive a degree in art history from a German institution, earning her undergraduate degree from the University of Bern in 1902 and going on to earn a PhD from Heidelberg University in 1904 and to pursue post-graduate studies at Leipzig University.

After her return to Hamburg in 1908, she worked at translation and publishing criticism. She translated Balzac, Zola and the Polish art historian Kazimierz Chłędowski into German. She gave early recognition to the Die Brücke group of artists. She helped found the Frauenbund zur Förderung deutscher bildenden Kunst (Women's Society for the Advancement of German Art) in 1916.

Schapire was herself a model for different painters. Karl Schmidt-Rottluff of the Brücke group made several portraits of her including one in 1919. Walter Gramatté painted her in 1920. In 1924, she published a catalogue of Karl Schmidt-Rottluff's graphic works.

In 1939, she was able to escape Nazi-dominated Germany for England. There, she contributed to various art journals, such as Architectural Review, Eidos, Connoisseur and Die Weltkunst. She also assisted Nikolaus Pevsner with collection of material for his series The Buildings of England.

She died in the Tate Gallery in 1954.

Her attempt to donate part of her collection to British museums while she was alive was not well-received and she donated the bulk of her art collection to museums in Germany: Mannheim, Berlin, Altona, Hamburg and Cologne. Other works were sent to museums in Holland, Belgium, New Zealand (Auckland Art Gallery Toi o Tāmaki), Chicago and Tel Aviv with the only British examples available at the Victoria and Albert Museum and Leicester Museum. However, there is one portrait of her by Karl Schmidt-Rottluff in The Tate.
