= A Perfect Day (song) =

Parlor song written by Carrie Jacobs-Bond in 1909

Front cover of "A Perfect Day" for low voice

A Perfect Day
Instrumental rendition done by the McKee Trio, 1915

"A Perfect Day" (first line: "When you come to the end of a perfect day") is a parlor song written by Carrie Jacobs-Bond (1862–1946) in 1909 at the Mission Inn, Riverside, California. Jacobs-Bond wrote the lyrics after watching the sun set over Mount Rubidoux from her 4th-floor room. She came up with the tune three months later while touring the Mojave Desert. For many years the Mission Inn played "A Perfect Day" on its carillon at the end of each day.

== Popularity ==
"A Perfect Day" was phenomenally successful when first published in 1910. Eight million copies of the sheet music and five million recordings sold within a year; 25 million copies of the sheet music sold during Jacobs-Bond's lifetime, and many millions of recordings circulated as various artists performed the song on the fast-growing means of audio duplication. It was her most-requested number when Jacobs-Bond entertained the soldiers at U.S. Army camps in Europe during World War I. The popularity of "A Perfect Day" became so rampant that even Jacobs-Bond indicated in her autobiography that she had "tired" of hearing it. Along with "Just Awearyin' for You" and "I Love You Truly"—both published in 1901 as part of the collection Seven Songs as Unpretentious as the Wild Rose—"A Perfect Day" augmented Jacobs-Bond's career as the first woman who made a living from composing.

According to "Backstairs At the White House" by former White House seamstress Lillian Rogers Parks, "A Perfect Day" was the favorite song of First Lady Florence Harding. She often had it played at White House concerts.

"A Perfect Day" was in the ship's songbook when RMS Titanic made its fatal maiden voyage in 1912.

== Artists ==
"A Perfect Day" has been frequently recorded in English. Otto Leisner's Norwegian translation was popularized by Sissel Kyrkjebø.

=== In English ===
Besides the plaintive 1915 McKee Trio instrumental rendition linked in this article, "A Perfect Day" has been recorded by numerous artists from various backgrounds, including:

- David Bispham
- Bing Crosby
- Evan Williams
- Clara Butt
- Eleanor Olson
- Nelson Eddy
- Jeanette MacDonald
- Rosa Ponselle
- Blue Mountains Trio
- Virgil Fox (organ only)
- Peggy Balensuela (singer) and William Hughes (piano)
- Mahalia Jackson
- Paul Robeson
- Alan Lindquest
- John McHugh
- Webster Booth
- Richard Tauber
- Judith Durham,
- The Fureys
- Annah Graefe,
- Moira Anderson
- Baritone Sir Thomas Allen accompanied by Malcolm Martineau
- Sydney MacEwan.
- Jo Stafford and Gordon MacRae recorded the song as a duet.

In the 1940 feature film Remember the Night, Sterling Holloway sang "A Perfect Day" accompanied by Barbara Stanwyck at the piano. In 1945, opera soprano Helen Traubel recorded an andante interpretation. In the 1940s, Alfredo Antonini and his orchestra collaborated with Victoria Cordova and John Serry Sr. to record the song for Muzak. Norma Zimmer sang "A Perfect Day" on the Lawrence Welk Show in 1962 in response to thousands of requests. In 1976, American tenor, Robert White, concluded his first album with RCA Records, When You and I Were Young, Maggie, with "A Perfect Day" accompanied by pianist Samuel Sanders.

=== In Norwegian ("En deilig dag") ===
Danish journalist Otto Leisner (1917–2008) translated "A Perfect Day" into Norwegian as "En deilig dag"; this translation has been recorded by, among others, Sissel Kyrkjebø.

== Character ==
"A Perfect Day" exemplifies the sentimentality popular in the late Victorian and post-Victorian era but has risen above such a sequestered view by nuances of studied reflection which, combined with the chord progressions of Jacobs-Bond's tune, have borne its appeal across time and cultural boundaries. "A Perfect Day" persists as an elegy using the analogy of the end of day as the end of life.

In 1929, at Lake Arrowhead, California, with "A Perfect Day" playing on a phonograph, Jacobs-Bond's only child, Frederick Jacobs Smith, committed suicide.

== See also ==
- List of best-selling sheet music
