= List of best-selling sheet music =

List of sheet music

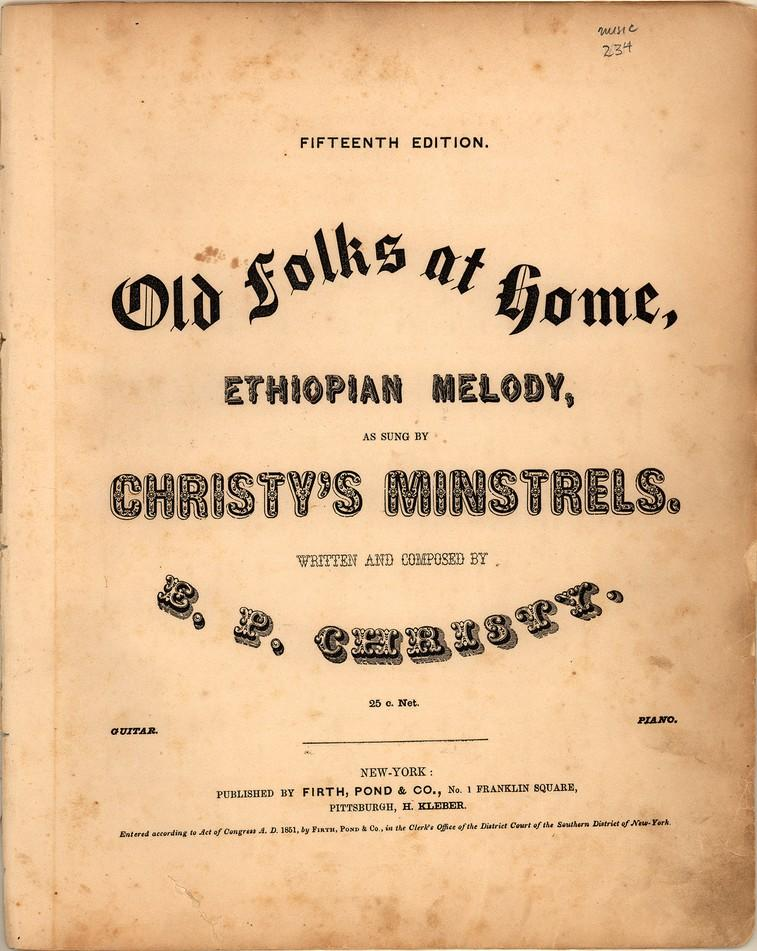
A copy of "Old Folks at Home" (1851), whose sales are estimated at over 20 million.

This list contains some of the best-selling songs in terms of sheet music sales in music publishing history, with copies reportedly of over 3 million. Figures on sheet music —as with record sales— reported by publishing firms were not always reliable.

In the United States, before "Oh! Susanna" (1848) no American song had sold more than five thousand copies of sheet music. Sales by 1852 of 75,000 copies of Stephen Foster's "Massa's in the Cold Ground" was considered "phenomenal" since music publishers did not try to promote songs. The first song to became "popular" through a national advertising campaign was "My Grandfather's Clock" in 1876. Mass production of pianos in the late-19th century helped boost sheet music sales. Toward the end of the century, during the Tin Pan Alley era, sheet music was sold by dozens and even hundreds of publishing companies. The sheet music industry also suffered due to the considerable sale of pirated reprints and lead sheets.

Reports vary widely to confirm the first million-seller song in sheet music; examples include "When This Cruel War Is Over" (1863), "After the Ball" (by 1892 or 1893), (Note: According to one author, "After the Ball" is "the first million seller to be conceived as a million seller, and marketed as a million seller".) and "Funiculì, Funiculà" in 1880. (Note: According to Howard Fishman, "Maple Leaf Rag" is often apocryphally cited as "the first song to sell a million copies".) From 1900 to 1910, over one hundred songs sold more than a million copies. Various "hit songs" sold as many as two or three million copies in print. With the advent of the radio broadcasting, sheet music sales of popular songs decreased and print figures failed to make a significant recovery after the World War II (1940s). Exact figures are lacking, but in the 1950s, sheet music sales averaged 300,000 annually. By 1966, the United States House Committee on the Judiciary informed 100,000 copies of a title were "rares". "(How Much Is) That Doggie in the Window?" (1953) is believed to be the last song to sell one million of sheet music, from that era. American musicologist Barry Kernfeld, said that in the 1950s, "a million-selling sheet-music title was entirely a thing of the past".

From the album era, "Stairway to Heaven" (1971) by Led Zeppelin is the biggest selling piece of sheet music in rock history, with over one million copies sold, selling 15,000 units per year at some point. In the digital era, "My Immortal" became an early example of healthy sheet music downloads, becoming the all-time best-selling sheet music download at Musicnotes, with over 8,350 copies until June 2004, outpacing "A Thousand Miles"'s 7,137 sales. Occasionally, Billboard reported the best-selling folios and singles sheet yearly, or by music publishing companies.

== Selected million-sellers print titles ==
Over 5 million
Year	Composer / Lyricist	Title	Notable recording artist(s)	Claimed sales (in million) (Note: Based on estimated sales. Sources don't specify whether the sales are global or from a specific country.)	Notes
1937	Harry Owens	"Sweet Leilani"	Bing Crosby	54	
1851	Stephen Foster	"Old Folks at Home"		20	Reputed sales from 1851 to 1977.
1855	Septimus Winner; Richard Milburn	"Listen to the Mocking Bird"		20	
1891	Charles K. Harris	"After the Ball"	Bing Crosby; various	10	Sales as of 1903.
1896	John Philip Sousa	"The Stars and Stripes Forever"		10	
1901	Carrie Jacobs-Bond	"I Love You Truly"		8	
1905	Beth Slater Whitson	"In the Shade of the Old Apple Tree"		8	
1910	Carrie Jacobs-Bond	"A Perfect Day"		8	
1949	Johnny Marks	"Rudolph the Red-Nosed Reindeer"	Gene Autry	8–7	
1910	Leo Friedman; Beth Slater Whitson	"Let Me Call You Sweetheart"	Bing Crosby; various	6	
1912	Tell Taylor	"Down by the Old Mill Stream"	Bing Crosby; various	6	
1942	Irving Berlin	"White Christmas"	Bing Crosby	6–5	3 million (4–5 years sales)
1912	Jack Judge; Harry Williams	"It's a Long Way to Tipperary"	Various	6	

3–4.9 million
Year	Composer / Lyricist	Title	Notable recording artist(s)	Claimed sales (in million)	Notes
1902	Paul Lincke; Heinz Bolten-Backers	"The Glow-Worm"		4	Sales in Europe and the United States.
1917	Billy Baskette; Benny Davis	"Good Bye Broadway, Hello France"	Bing Crosby	4	
1914	James Royce Shannon; Lee Edgar Settle	"Missouri Waltz"	Various	3.5	
1918	Richard A. Whiting; Raymond B. Egan	"Till We Meet Again"	Various	3.5	
1871	William Shakespeare	"Mollie Darling"		3	
1907	Gus Edwards; Will D. Cobb	"School Days"		3	
1914	Harry Carroll; Harold R. Atteridge	"By the Beautiful Sea"	American Quartet	3	
1917	Lee S. Roberts; J. Will Callahan	"Smiles"		3	
1917	George W. Meyer; Edgar Leslie; E. Ray Goetz	"For Me and My Gal"		3	
1919	Worton David; Lawrence Wright	"That Old-Fashioned Mother of Mine"		3	
1920	Lawrence Wright	"Wyoming Lullaby"		3	

== Best-selling individuals ==
Century	Composer(s)	Sales (in million)	Notes
20th	Jay Livingston-Ray Evans	46	With eighteen songs
19th	William Shakespeare Hays	25	Credited to 350 songs.
19th	Carrie Jacobs-Bond	20	Credited to 200 songs.

== See also ==
- Song plugger
- Parlor song
