= Eugenia Farrar =

American singer (1875–1966)

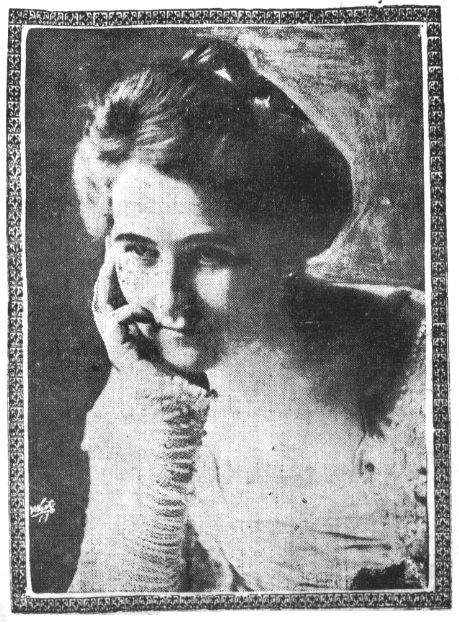
- Farrar in 1911
- Born: Ada Eugenia Hildegard von Böös; 1875; Stockholm, Sweden
- Died: May 17, 1966 (aged 90–91); New York City, US
- Occupation: Singer
- Known for: First live radio singing performance (1907)
- Spouse: Leonard C. Farrar (m. 1903–1909)

Eugenia Farrar (1875 – May 17, 1966), whose full name was Ada Eugenia Hildegard von Boos Farrar, was a mezzo-soprano singer and philanthropist. She was born in Sweden and lived most of her life in New York City. In the fall of 1907 she gave what is commonly believed to be the first live radio singing performance, when she sang over Lee de Forest's experimental transmitter located atop the Parker Building in New York City.

== Biography ==
Farrar was born in Stockholm, Sweden in 1875. Her parents were Fredericka Wilhelmina Berglund and Count John Matthias von Böös, whose title was through the German "House of Böös zu Waldeck". After her father died when she was 17, she and her mother moved to the United States, settling in New York City, where Eugenia began to establish herself a professional singer, specializing in religious songs. On November 26, 1903 she married Leonard C. Farrar. She gave what is commonly believed to be the first live radio singing performance in the fall of 1907, when, while touring Lee de Forest's experimental radio station, she was encouraged by the inventor to perform two songs.

Farrar did extensive work with families of prison inmates, and in 1908 announced plans to build a small settlement, Brookside Farm, located in Bardonia, for spouses and children of prisoners. However this effort proved unsuccessful. In December 1909 she was granted an "absolute divorce" on account of her husband's infidelities. It was noted at the time that the couple did not have any children.

She performed in numerous charitable concerts, becoming known as the "Angel of the Tombs Prison" in recognition of her work supporting families of prisoners incarcerated there. However, she ultimately faced severe financial problems, which led to her declaring bankruptcy in 1916.

The May 22, 1957 episode of the This Is Your Life television program honored Lee de Forest, and Farrar was one of the featured guests. Joining her was Oliver Wyckoff, who had reported hearing her 1907 broadcast while a Navy radio operator stationed aboard the U.S.S. Dolphin, which was docked at the Brooklyn Navy Yard.

Farrar died on May 17, 1966, and an urn containing her ashes was given to Oliver Wyckoff. After Wyckoff's death in 1973, the urn was in turn transferred to Wyckoff’s daughter, Marjorie Collins, then to granddaughter Nancy Hefter, then to great granddaughter Sharon Loving, who gave the urn for storage at the Brooklyn Navy Yard. In 2008, Navy Yard employees Melissa Dubbin and Aaron S. Davidson prepared a replacement urn, which was placed on display along with biographical information at the Green-Wood cemetery in New York City.

== 1907 radio broadcast ==
Although radiotelegraph communication using Morse code dated to the late 1800s, in 1907 radiotelephone transmissions were still in the experimental stage. In the summer and fall of that year Lee de Forest was busy preparing radiotelephone transmitter installations on the U.S. Navy vessels forming the Great White Fleet, and he established a laboratory atop the Parker Building in New York City. The earliest test transmissions from this site were phonograph records, spoken word, and electronic music produced by a telharmonium. Farrar later recollected that she accompanied an unnamed "woman reporter" to visit the Parker Building facility. De Forest found out that she was a professional singer, so he invited her to sing into the crude transmitter. According to her, "I sang two favorites by Carrie Jacobs Bond--I Love You Truly and Just A'Wearying For You."

In contrast to Farrar's more detailed accounts, Lee de Forest provided little information about her 1907 broadcast. In 1925 Radio News magazine ran an extensive multi-part biographical series, but it does not mention the Farrar broadcast. A second detailed accounting of de Forest's life appeared in 1942 in the Saturday Evening Post, but this also has no information.

However, Farrar appeared on the April 6, 1939 broadcast of Major Bowes Original Amateur Hour, where she sang I Love You Truly, and commented that this national broadcast had a much larger audience than her 1907 debut. In addition, at a September 22 "Lee De Forest Day" luncheon at the 1939 New York World's Fair, Farrar briefly spoke and was described as the "first singer to go on the air for Dr. DeForest in 1907". And in his 1950 autobiography, de Forest makes a passing reference to the broadcast, stating: "The equipment was put on board the battleships in the Brooklyn Navy Yard, and final tests were made on the eve of the ships' departure from New England waters. It was on that occasion that the first human voice actually sang into the radiotelephone transmitter. A handsome contralto singer by the name of Van Boos was invited to my laboratory to sing. The song she selected for this occasion was, I Love You Truly. It was heard by operators Smith and Wallace in the Brooklyn Navy Yard."

Some accounts state that after Farrar's singing was heard by radio operators at the Brooklyn Naval Yard, they contacted the New York Herald, which ran a short review which was read by de Forest. However, no Herald article reviewing the broadcast has been found, which has led to doubts about its existence. Moreover, in his autobiography de Forest does not mention seeing a Herald article reporting the broadcast, although in the book's previous paragraph he had quoted a September Herald article announcing the Great White Fleet installations.

Although Farrar stated that her broadcast took place in the month of October, the lack of a contemporary report has led to various dates being suggested, including February 1907, a "Spring afternoon", and December 16, 1907. Also, in their individual accounts Farrar and Lee de Forest both stated that the broadcast originated from de Forest's Parker Building laboratory. However, other sources have placed the origin as the Brooklyn Navy Yard, from aboard the Dolphin, or from the Great White Fleet's flagship, Connecticut.
