= Harry Burleigh =

American opera singer

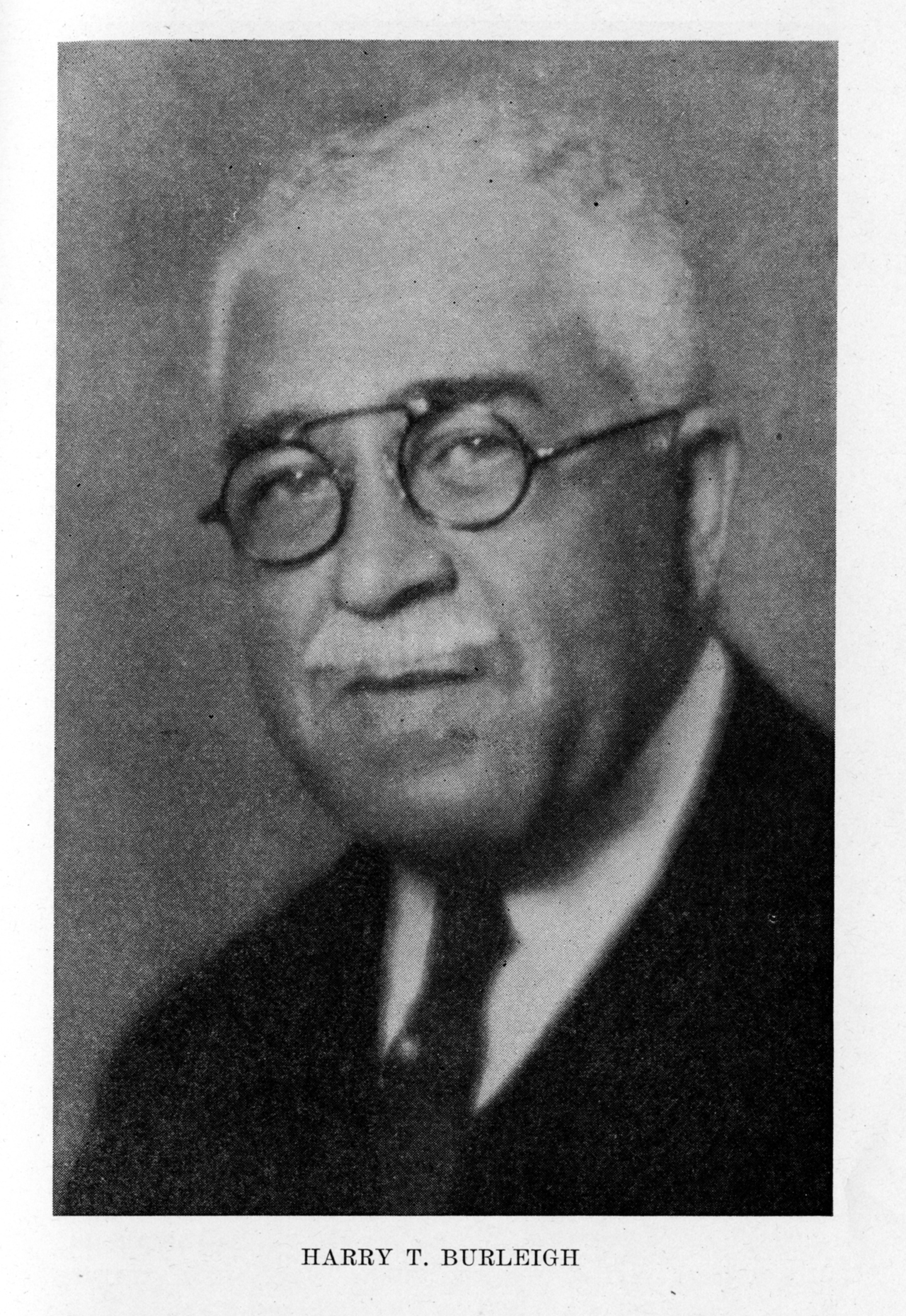

Background information
- Born: Henry Thacker Burleigh; December 2, 1866; Erie, Pennsylvania, U.S.
- Died: September 12, 1949 (aged 82) Stamford, Connecticut, U.S.
- Occupations: Singer, composer, arranger

Harry Burleigh (born Henry Thacker Burleigh, December 2, 1866 – September 12, 1949) was an American classical composer, arranger, and professional singer known for his baritone voice. The first black composer who was instrumental in developing characteristically American music, Burleigh made black music available to classically trained artists both by introducing them to spirituals and by arranging spirituals in a more classical form. Burleigh also introduced Antonín Dvořák to Black American music, which influenced some of Dvořák's most famous compositions and led him to say that Black music would be the basis of an American classical music.

== Early and family life ==
Henry "Harry" Thacker Burleigh was born in Erie, Pennsylvania, in 1866 to Elizabeth Burleigh and Henry Thacker. Burleigh's maternal grandfather, Hamilton Waters, was granted manumission from slavery in Somerset County, Maryland, after paying $55 ($50 for him and $5 for his mother) in 1832 and receiving a certificate of freedom in 1835. They traveled to Ithaca, New York, where two of Waters's half-brothers lived. After his mother died, Waters married Lucinda Duncanson. Their first child, Elizabeth Lovey Waters (who would be Burleigh's mother) was born in Lansing, New York, in 1838. Later that year the family moved to Erie, Pennsylvania, where they lived until the 1920s. Elizabeth, who was graduated from Avery College in Pittsburgh in 1855, was denied a teaching position in the Erie Public Schools, but taught at the Colored School for many years.

Burleigh's father, Henry Thacker Burleigh Sr., a naval veteran in the Civil War, was the first black juror in Erie County in 1871. After his death in 1873, Elizabeth remarried in 1875. Her second husband, John Elmendorf, was also a veteran of the Union Navy.

Burleigh's grandfather, who was known for his "exceptionally melodious voice", taught young Burleigh and his brother Reginald traditional spirituals and slave songs.

Burleigh helped support his family by various odd jobs: lighting gas streetlamps, selling newspapers and working as a printer's devil, as a coachman, and as a steward on Lake Erie steamboats. He also studied to be an accountant at the Clark's Business College while he was in high school.

Burleigh's mother worked part-time for Elizabeth Russell, a music lover who hosted musical recitals at her home. Burleigh stood outside of Russell's home in the snow in order to listen to Hungarian pianist Rafael Joseffy's recital, after which Burleigh became ill. Burleigh's mother then asked Russell to hire Burleigh as a doorman. This allowed Burleigh to listen to performances of well-known musicians such as Venezuelan pianist Teresa Carreño and Italian tenor Italo Campanini.

Burleigh studied voice with George F. Brierly, an English church musician. During and after his high school years, Burleigh became known as one of Erie's most accomplished classical singers. Several Erie churches and the Jewish synagogue hired him as a soloist, and he also sang as soloist at many community and civic events.

== Studies at the National Conservatory ==
In 1892, Burleigh was accepted, with a scholarship, to the prestigious National Conservatory of Music in New York at the age of 26. He obtained the scholarship with the help of Frances MacDowell, the mother of composer Edward MacDowell, and he would eventually play double bass in the Conservatory's orchestra.

At the Conservatory, Burleigh studied composition with Christian Fritsch, Rubin Goldmark, John White, and Max Spicker.

=== Audition ===
Burleigh described that among the renowned jurors of his audition for the Conservatory were Rafael Joseffy, Romualso Spaio, and Adele Marguilies. Burleigh, to his recollection, was given an ABA for reading and B for voice, when AA was the required mark. The conservatory's registrar, Frances Macdowll, informed Burleigh of his audition failure.

Burleigh had first seen Macdowell at a musicale performed by pianist Teresa Caroño—teacher of Macdowell's son, Edward Macdowell—at the home of Robert W. Russell, where Burleigh's mother was a maid and Burleigh was a doorman.

Burleigh told Macdowell of his "cherished longings" of becoming a professional singer and showed her a letter of recommendation from Elizabeth Russell.Macdowell then intervened on Burleigh's behalf. Though it is unclear whether Burleigh was given a second audition, a few days later, Burleigh became recipient of the tuition scholarship—one of the four recipients among the two hundred applicants in January, 1892.

=== Relationship with Dvořák ===
To help support himself during his studies, Burleigh worked for Mrs. MacDowell as a handyman, cleaning and working on anything she needed. Reputedly, Burleigh, who later became known worldwide for his excellent baritone voice, sang spirituals while cleaning the Conservatory's halls, which drew the attention of the conservatory's director, Czech composer Antonín Dvořák, who asked Burleigh to sing for him. Burleigh said: "I sang our Negro songs for him very often, and before he wrote his own themes, he filled himself with the spirit of the old Spirituals." Dvořák said: "In the negro melodies of America I discover all that is needed for a great and noble school of music."

From what he called "Negro melodies" and Native American music, Dvořák took up the Pentatonic scale, which appears in some places in his Symphony "From the New World" and at the beginning of each movement of the "American" String Quartet. In the Symphony, a flute theme resembles the spiritual "Swing Low, Sweet Chariot" that may well be among those Burleigh sang to Dvořák.

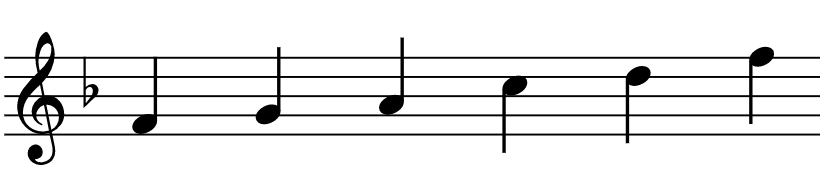
Major pentatonic scale - F - Treble

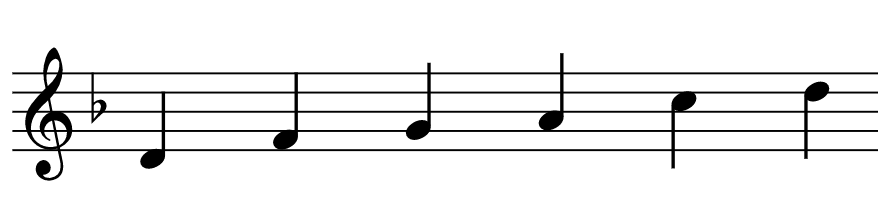
Minor pentatonic scale - D - Treble Clef

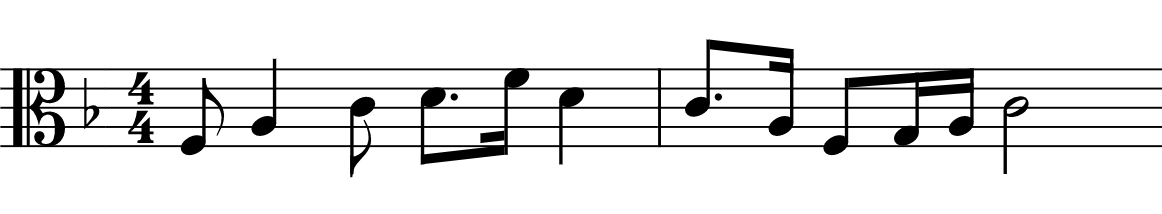
Dvorak Quartet op96 - 1st movement - Viola theme

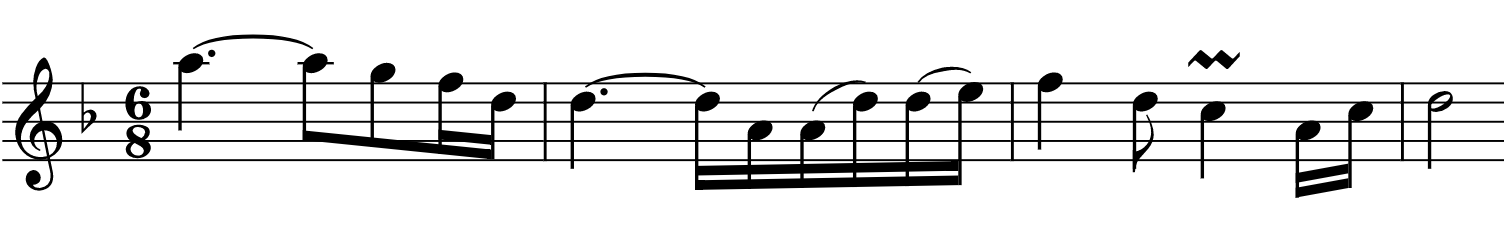
Dvorak Quartet op96 - 2nd movement - Main theme

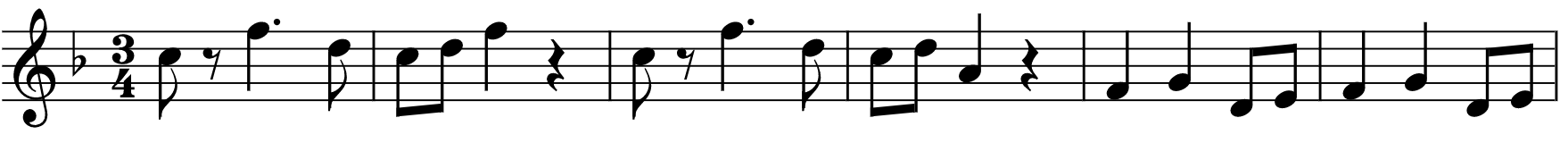
Dvorak Quartet op96 - mvt 3 - Main Theme

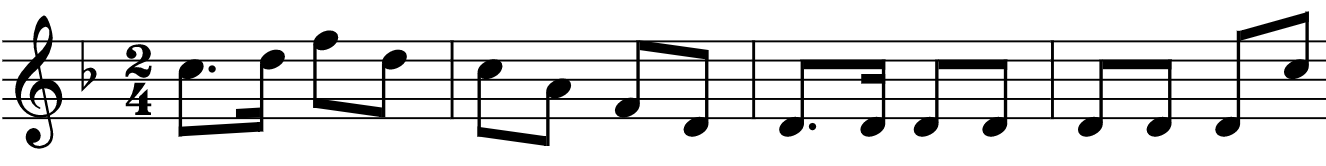
Dvorak Quartet op96 - mvt 4 - main theme

In 1922, another student of Dvořák, William Arms Fisher, wrote the spiritual-like song "Goin' Home" based on an English horn melody from the second movement (Largo) of the Symphony. No evidence seems to exist that the song existed before 1922, or the melody before the Symphony (1893), although both are disputed. In 1893 Burleigh assisted Dvořák in copying out instrumental parts for the symphony.

The following year, Burleigh sang in Dvořák's arrangement of Pennsylvania native Stephen C. Foster's classic "Old Folks at Home". He graduated in 1896, and later served on the conservatory's faculty.

== Singing career ==
Burleigh began his singing career as the baritone in his family's quartet. By the time Burleigh left Erie in January 1892, he was singing with the city's best vocalists at civic events and church gatherings. At the end of the summer of 1892, Burleigh gave a performance in the Adirondacks, at North Hudson, New York, as the featured soloist in "the summer school for Christian workers". Nine months after arriving in New York City, Burleigh appeared in two Grand Encampment Concerts at the Metropolitan Church in Washington, D.C., as "the celebrated Western baritone." Burleigh’s 1894 appearance at the Tarrytown Music Hall was one of his first public performances in the New York metropolitan area.

In 1894, he became a soloist for St. George's Episcopal Church in New York City. Some parishioners opposed hiring Burleigh at the all-white church, because of his race, at a time when other white New York Episcopal churches were forbidding black people to worship. J. P. Morgan, a member of St. George's at that time, cast the deciding vote to hire Burleigh. In spite of the initial problems obtaining the appointment, Burleigh became close to many members during his long tenure as a soloist at the church. In 1946, he retired from this position after 52 years. He was instrumental in starting its tradition of an annual Spirituals service every May (1924–55). His singing "The Palms" by Jean-Baptiste Faure was a Palm Sunday tradition for 50 years, and New York mayor Fiorello La Guardia arranged a radio broadcast from his office in 1944. In the late 1890s, Burleigh gained a reputation as a concert soloist, singing art songs and opera selections, as well as African-American folk songs. He sang before King Edward VII in London in 1908, among other prestigious European concerts. From 1900 to 1925, Burleigh was also a member of the synagogue choir at the Temple Emanu-El in New York, the only African-American to sing there. He also frequently worked with Walter F. Craig and his orchestra.

Burleigh disdained recording and it was long (mistakenly) believed that no recording existed of his voice. He recorded once in 1919, for a small label run by his friend George Broome, and again in 1944 for St. George's Church. The 1919 recording exists, but the latter recordings have never been found.

== Arrangements and compositions ==
In the late 1890s, Burleigh also began to publish his own arrangements of art songs. About 1898, he began to compose his own songs, and by the late 1910s, Burleigh was one of America's best-known composers of art songs. Beginning around 1910, Burleigh also worked editing music for G. Ricordi, an Italian music publisher with offices in New York.

Burleigh published several versions of the Negro spiritual "Deep River" in 1916 and 1917, and quickly became known for his arrangements of spirituals for voice and piano. One of his arrangements in Common Metre is the hymn tune "McKee", used with John Oxenham's hymn "In Christ There Is No East or West". His arrangements helped to make spirituals a popular genre for concert singers, and within a few years, many notable singers performed Burleigh's arrangements.

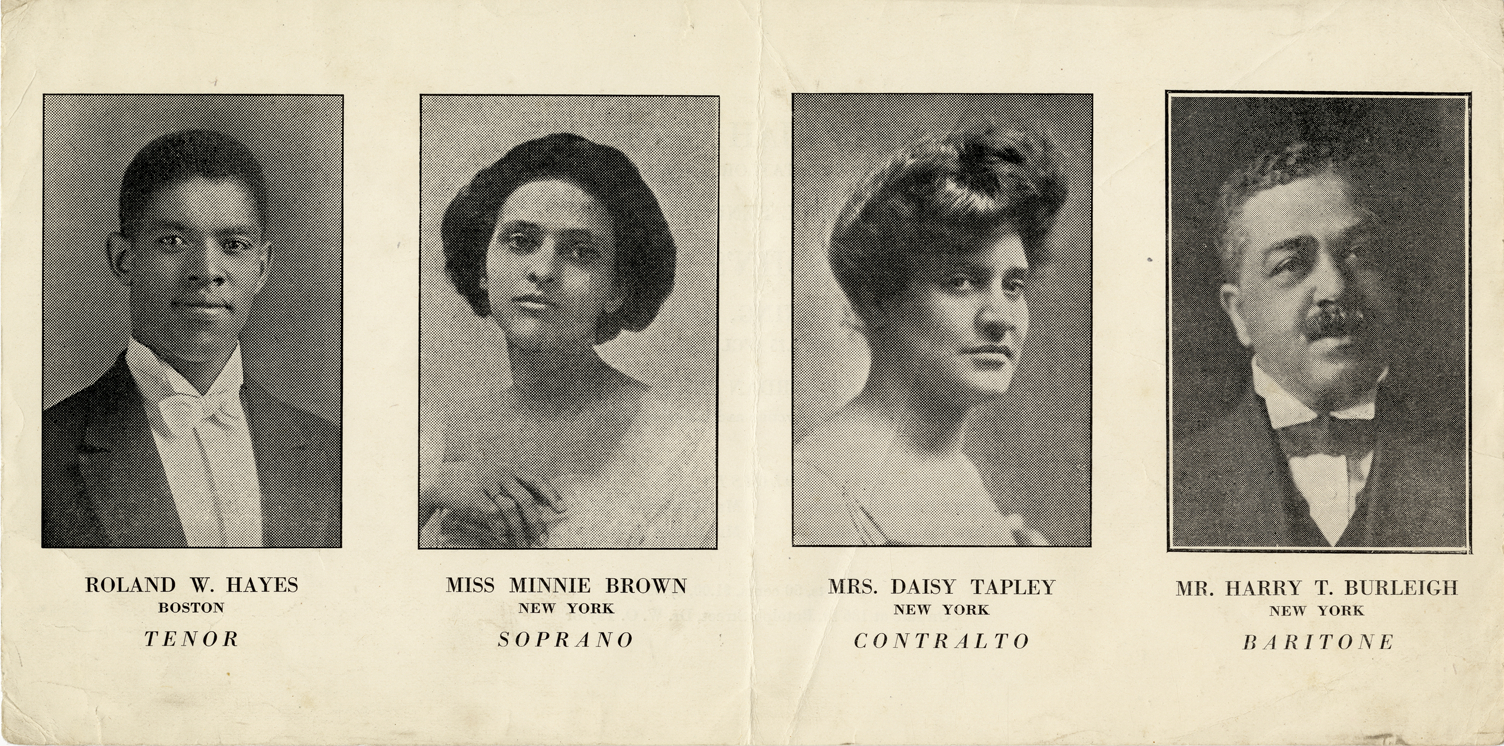
Photographs of performers Hayes, Brown, Tapley, and Burleigh from a 1915 Boston performance

Burleigh's art song arrangements of spirituals and sentimental songs were so popular during the late 1910s and 1920s, that almost no vocal recitalist gave a concert in a major city without occasionally singing them. John McCormack sang several of Burleigh's songs in concert, including "Little Mother of Mine" (1917), "Dear Old Pal of Mine" (1918), "Under a Blazing Star" (1918), and "In the Great Somewhere" (1919). The popularity of Burleigh's settings contributed to an explosion of popularity for the genre during the 1920s. He set some poems by Walt Whitman to music and also published music for piano and violin.

Estimates of Burleigh's original musical output range from 200 to 300 songs. In 1914, he was a founding member of the American Society of Composers, Authors, and Publishers (ASCAP), and received a seat on its board of directors in 1941.

== Death and legacy ==
Through the 1920s and 1930s, Burleigh continued to promote especially the spirituals through publications, lectures, and arrangements. His lifelong advocacy for the spiritual eclipsed his singing career, as well as his arrangements of art songs. He retired in 1946 because of ill health, and his son moved him from Long Island to a retirement home in Stamford, Connecticut, where he died, aged 82, from heart failure on September 12, 1949. More than 2,000 people attended his funeral at St. George's Church. Pallbearers included Hall Johnson, Noble Sissle, Eubie Blake, William C. Handy, and Cameron White. His remains were returned for burial in Erie, Pennsylvania.

With the success of Roland Hayes, Marian Anderson, and Paul Robeson, among others, many of whom he had coached, Burleigh's seminal role in establishing African-American soloists on America's recital stages seemed eclipsed. His many popular art songs from the early twentieth century have often been out of print since the composer's death. Nevertheless, he remains one of America's most important composers from the early twentieth century.

In 1917, Burleigh received the Spingarn Medal, which the National Association for the Advancement of Colored People (NAACP) awards annually for outstanding achievement by an African American. He also received honorary degrees from Howard University and Atlanta University.

In 1928, the oldest HBCU in the US, Cheyney State Teachers College (now Cheyney University of Pennsylvania) built a men's dormitory, Harry T. Burleigh Hall. It has been renovated and now contains offices.

Nobody Knows: Songs of Harry T. Burleigh, an album of his works by Karen Parks (co-produced by Parks and Grammy-winning producer David Macias), debuted at No. 2 on Billboard's Traditional Classical Album Chart upon its 2008 release.

Works he edited or transcribed continue in the 1982 Hymnal of the Episcopal Church (United States), including No. 529 ("In Christ there is no East or West").

Other arrangements are included in the alternative hymnals, including Lift Every Voice and Sing.

In 2019, a committee was formed by Michelle Deal Winfield, State Committeewoman, 74th Assembly District to petition Community Board Six Manhattan for a street co-naming: Harry T. Burleigh Place. The NYC Council Member Carlina Rivera submitted the application and it was approved. The ceremony was held at South East corner of East Sixteenth Street and Third Avenue in Manhattan on September 12, 2021. In October 2021, U.S. Representative Carolyn B. Maloney entered the celebration of Henry Thacker "Harry" Burleigh into the Congressional Record Extension Remarks: Volume 167, Number 179.

== Selected works ==
=== Violin and piano ===
- Six Plantation Melodies for Violin and Piano (1901)
- Southland Sketches (1916)

=== Piano ===
- From the Southland (1910)

=== Art songs ===
- "Just Awearyin' for You", w. Frank Lebby Stanton (1894) m. Burleigh, not to be confused with Carrie Jacobs-Bond's more popular 1901 tune to the same lyrics
- "Waiting" (poem of Martha Dickinson Bianchi, 1904)
- "I Love My Jean" (Robert Burns poem, 1914)
- "Jean" (1914), w. Frank Lebby Stanton m. H. T. Burleigh
- "Saracen Songs" (1914)
- "The Prayer" (1915)
- "The Young Warrior" (poem of James Weldon Johnson, 1916)
- "Ethiopia Saluting the Colors" (poem of Walt Whitman, 1916)
- "Little Mother of Mine" (1917)
- "Sailor's Wife" (1917)
- "Dear Old Pal of Mine" (1918)
- "Under a Blazing Star" (1918)
- "In the Great Somewhere" (1919)
- "Five Songs" (poems of Laurence Hope, 1919)
- "Lovely Dark and Lonely One" (poem of Langston Hughes, 1935)
