= Tarrytown Music Hall =

Music Hall
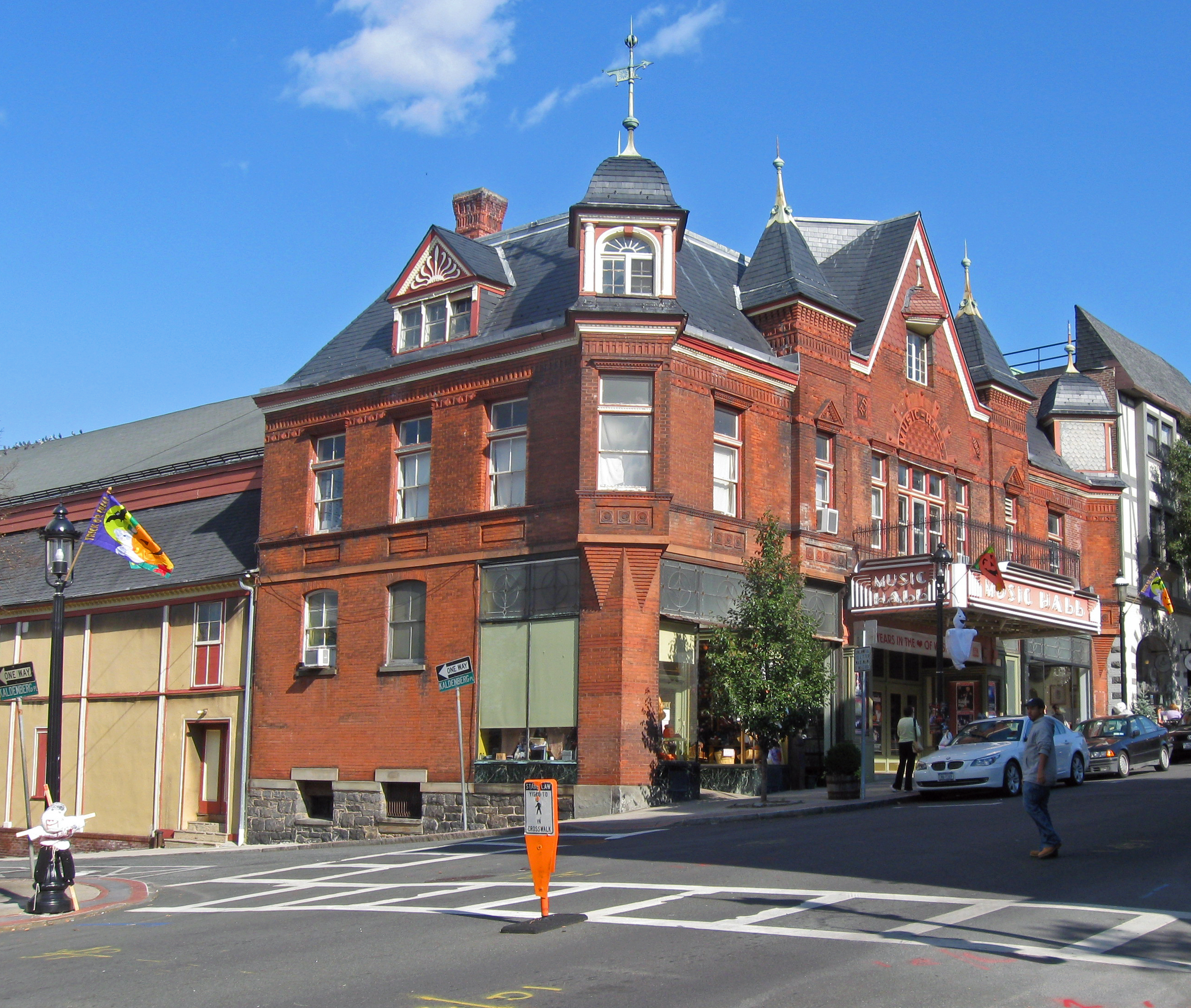
- West profile and south elevation, 2010
- Interactive map of Music Hall
- Address: 11 Main St. Tarrytown, NY; USA
- Coordinates: 41.07659°N 73.85890°W
- Owner: The Friends of the Mozartina Musical Arts Conservatory, Inc
- Capacity: 843
- Type: Music hall
- Designation: NRHP #80002795

Construction
- Opened: 1885–1976
- Reopened: 1981
- Rebuilt: Early 1980s
- Architect: Philip Edmunds

Website
- http://www.tarrytownmusichall.org

The Music Hall, in Tarrytown, New York, United States, is located on West Main Street downtown. It is a brick structure in the Queen Anne architectural style erected in the late 19th century. In 1980, it was listed on the National Register of Historic Places.

It is the oldest theater in Westchester County still used as a theater, and considered one of the county's finest non-residential applications of the Queen Anne Style. In 1901 it was one of the first theaters to show the new form of entertainment called motion pictures. Dave Brubeck, Louis Armstrong and Miles Davis are among the musicians who have performed there. Many classical music performances have been recorded there to take advantage of its excellent acoustics. It is one of only 6% of theaters in the United States built before 1900.

It closed in 1976 due to neglect and structural problems. Shortly after it was listed on the Register, a local not-for-profit bought it and restored it. It has remained in operation since it was reopened a few years later, with several other renovations. More notable artists have performed there since then and it has been used in several films and television commercials.

== Building ==
The Music Hall is located on the northeast corner of the intersection of West Main and Kaldenberg Place, one block west of Broadway (U.S. Route 9). The surrounding neighborhood is a densely developed urban core, with many two-story commercial and mixed-use buildings. Some mature trees grow above building height, and there are a few parking lots between and behind the buildings. The terrain slopes gradually towards the Hudson River 0.6 mile (1 km) to the west.

=== Exterior ===
The building itself is a two-and-a-half-story three-by-seven-bay structure. Its south (front) facade and the first three bays on the east and west have a rough-cut granite foundation and brick facing. The remaining bays and the north elevation have a brick foundation with stucco and half-timber facing. A limestone water table at the southwest corner appears to be the foundation due to the slope exposing it. Atop the building is a hipped roof shingled in slate with a cast iron parapet railing around its flat central section.

On the south the facade is intricately and elaborately detailed, with square corner towers and a gable-roofed middle section flanked by two smaller square quoined towers. Two small shops with flank the main entrance. Their windows are topped with panels of frosted glass set with designs of stained glass and lead, panels that also top the nearby doors leading to stairs to the upper floors. Above the main entrance is the marquee. Its flat top has another iron railing; illuminated lettering on it spells out "Music Hall" on all three sides.

Two terra cotta belt courses with paneling between set off the second story, with large corbels on the corner towers. The upper one forms the sill of the one-over-one double-hung sash windows with painted wood surrounds and glass transoms topped by terra cotta lintels. On the towers flanking the center, these windows are additionally topped by triangular panels. In the middle a door to the balcony creates a tripartite version of the window with an additional two flanking windows. Above it is an arched brick, stone and terra cotta panel with "Music Hall" spelled out in the semicircle below large keystone-shaped arrangements. The "18" and "85" on the sides indicates the construction date.

A terracotta and sandstone string course tops the windows on the second story, with corbelling between it and the corniced roofline. Similar, but more intricate decoration graces the flanking towers at the center. The gable field has an eight-pane double casement window, with the brick and terra cotta giving way to fish-scale wood shingles midway up. Above the window is a bell-shaped hood with finial. The roofline has the same treatment as the flat portions of the roof.

The southeast and southwest facades of the corner towers have a small arched window with fanlight flanked by two small smooth wooden Doric pilasters. Similar openings in the other sides have been shingled over in slate. Atop the towers are bell-cast roofs shingled in slate and topped by finials as well with weather vanes. The center flanking towers have flared pyramidal roofs and finials.

Fenestration on the stucco and half-timber section in the rear consists of six rectangular windows and five doors. They are placed irregularly on the two stories. The only decorative touch is the triangular pediment on one dormer window at the roof.

=== Interior ===
The lobby uses mostly marble and limestone with brass trim. Detailing uses classically-inspired motifs. To the rear, the large entertainment space has been extensively modified from its original design. It has a pitched floor with 843 permanent seats. Plaster panels on the wall conceal the original wooden arches. Silhouettes of figures in early 20th-century dress decorate wall niches in the panels as well as stair landings and hallways. Similar landscapes in silhouette fill the domes beneath the balcony.

Higher up, the plaster panels on the arched ceiling spandrels and frieze have been painted gold, as have the classical elements on the stage wall. The plaster ceiling medallions from which the chandeliers hang are original. Backstage the original ceiling arches are intact, as are the murals and door surrounds. Other original finishing can also be found in one of the second-floor apartments, now used as office space.

== History ==
In 1885, William L. Wallace, a local chocolate manufacturer, had the idea to build a theater in the heart of Tarrytown. The building was to be mixed-use with apartments and commercial space, as well as a large entertainment area in the rear. Architect Philip Edmunds's design exemplified the Queen Anne style in its mix of materials, as advocated by Richard Norman Shaw, considered to have established the style. It cost Wallace $50,000 ($1.79 million in modern dollars) to build and opened in December. The first night's performance was instrumental selections from The Mikado with a quartet vocal performance of "Moonlight on the Lake". Harry Burleigh’s 1894 appearance at the Music Hall was one of the first public performances in his singing career.

Originally, the performance space had a flat floor with removable seating. The stage is not believed to have been movable, although that was possible at the time. The wooden spandrels were visible, as was elaborate classical detailing, such as the molded consoles supporting the balcony and elaborate brackets supporting the main floor posts.

The more flexible interior space allowed the theater to host all sorts of events, including several roller skating contests in 1886. It was altered in 1901 to accommodate motion pictures, a new form of entertainment it was one of the first theaters to show. The following year, the wealthy residents of Tarrytown sponsored the first of several lavish annual flower shows. John D. Rockefeller often loaned palm trees grown in the greenhouses at Kykuit, his nearby estate, for use in sets. The original gas chandeliers were replaced with electric ones in 1910.

In 1915 another alteration moved the main entrance from the west facade to its current location. That year it hosted the Cotton Ball, a major women's suffrage rally. Other political events the Music Hall hosted during the Progressive Era included speeches by Woodrow Wilson and Theodore Roosevelt. Performers of that era included Antonín Dvořák and Mae West.

A further remodeling in 1922 changed the interior to its present configuration, sloping the floor, adding permanent seats and covering the wall spandrels with plaster. The new interior added some Art Nouveau and Art Deco elements. By 1930, the theater was exclusively showing films. It continued to do so until 1976, when television and larger multi-screen theaters had undercut its business. The village proposed that the vacant theater be torn down to make way for a parking lot.

That fate was avoided around the time it was listed on the Register. In 1980 the Friends of the Mozartina Musical Arts Conservatory, a not-for-profit organization, purchased the abandoned theater to preserve it and establish a center for the performing arts. It was necessary to repair electrical and plumbing infrastructure damaged by years of neglect.

For 23 years the Music Hall was run by a volunteer staff, primarily local music professor Berthold Ringeisen and his wife Helen. Due to its wooden arches, the theater's acoustics are excellent enough that many classical music performances have been recorded there. In 2009, the Canadian Brass could be heard clearly in the rear of the theater without amplification.

Bjorn Olsson was hired as the theater's first full-time professional director in 2003. That year the theater spent $100,000 to re-roof one side of the building, replace the stage curtain, spotlights and sandbags. Four years later, in 2007, it bought the property behind the theater to use as staff parking and for a possible future loading dock. The year afterwards, a local Junior League chapter raised most of the money to replace the original air conditioning after it failed. The restrooms were made disabled accessible in 2011.

Today, the theater hosts performances 180 days a year. Several films and television commercials have been shot in the building, including The Preacher's Wife (1996), The Impostors (1998), The Secret Lives of Dentists (2003), Mona Lisa Smile (2003), Game 6 (2005), and The Good Shepherd, a 2006 film directed by Robert De Niro which filmed on location at the Music Hall in November 2005. More recently, exterior and interior scenes from the 2011 film, Henry's Crime, starring Keanu Reeves, were shot at the Tarrytown Music Hall in January 2010.

Random Farms Kids Theater (a Westchester-based non-profit children's theater and founded by Anya Wallach in 1996), Ars Viva Chamber Orchestra (a premiere chamber orchestra), and Westchester Symphonic Winds (an adult community-based 60-piece wind and percussion ensemble) are all currently recognized as resident companies of the Tarrytown Music Hall.

In 2012, the alternative music group guster filmed a DVD at the Music Hall during their acoustic tour.

In 2018, The Music Hall introduced a resident theater arts program for young people called The Tarrytown Music Hall Academy, offering a variety of workshops to kids in the Hudson Valley and beyond with a focus on the process of creating theater arts, including lighting, costume, and set design, play writing, stage combat choreography, as well as performance.

== See also ==
- National Register of Historic Places listings in northern Westchester County, New York
