= Evan Williams (tenor) =

American singer

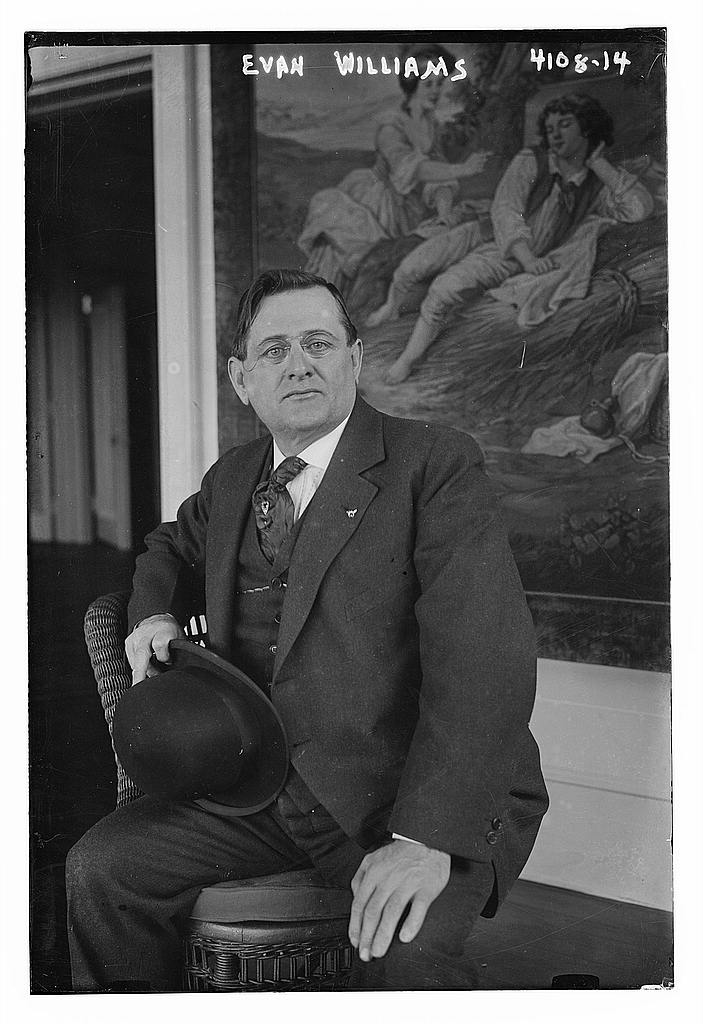
Evan Williams c. 1917

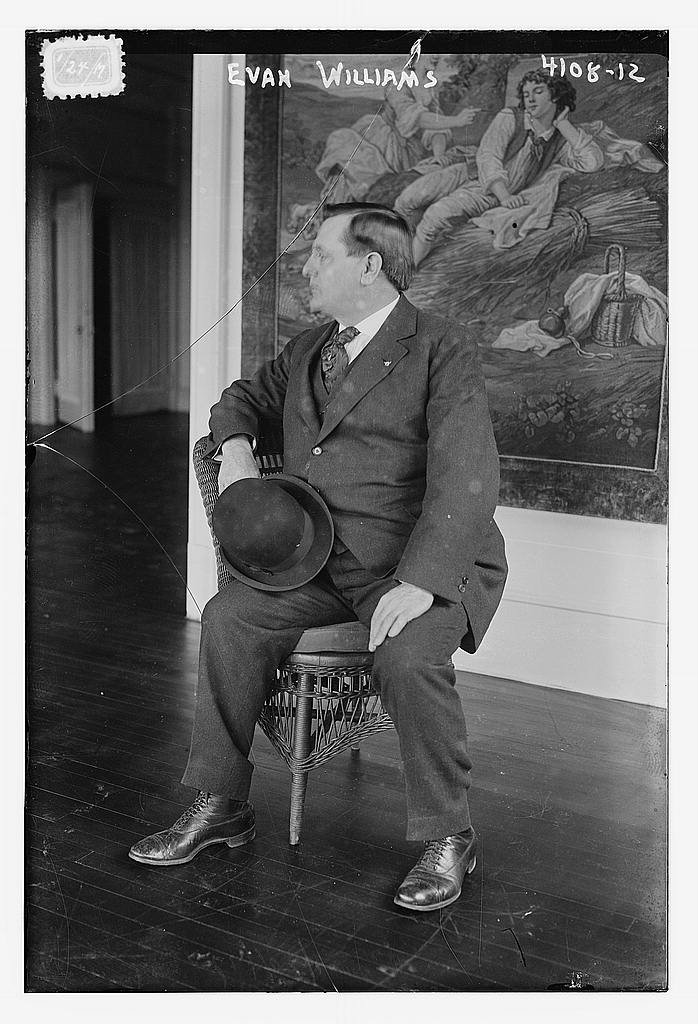
Evan Williams c. 1917

Henry Evan Williams (7 September 1867 – 24 May 1918) was an oratorio tenor. He was a popular recording artist, making almost one hundred records for the Victor Talking Machine Company in the United States and The Gramophone Company (His Master's Voice) in England. Williams gave more than 1,000 performances and recitals during his 25-year professional career across the United States and in England and Wales. Williams was praised most highly by critics for his interpretations of Handel.

"Just Awearyin' for You"
1911 recording of Evan Williams singing "Just Awearyin' for You" (w. Frank Lebby Stanton m. Carrie Jacobs-Bond)

== Biography ==
Williams was born on 7 September 1867 in Mineral Ridge, Ohio, the son of David Williams and Gwendolyn Harris. His parents were recent poor immigrants from Pembrokeshire, Wales. They were married in 1867 in Trumbull County, Ohio. When Evan was 13 years old, his Mother died in childbirth and he was sent to live with his aunt and uncle, Thomas and Sarah Davis in Thomastown, a Welsh immigrant mining community near Akron, Ohio.

As a youth, Evans worked in coal mines in the Akron area. His voice was discovered while singing in a local church choir. He began lessons with Madame Louise Von Feilitsch in Cleveland. In 1891, he rose to prominence after joining a Welsh choir in Galion, Ohio. By 1894, he was performing in London and began dividing his career between appearances in the United Kingdom and in the United States. After Evans was hired as the soloist at the Marble Collegiate Church in New York City, he was reputed to be the highest-paid church singer in the world at the time. In 1896, he gave his first performance at the well known Worcester Music Festival in Worcester, Massachusetts. In 1907, he returned to the United States for most of the rest of his performing career, where he sang as a tenor soloist for various choral societies and in concerts all over the country. He made several records for the Victor Talking Machine Company and was one of the most popular Red Seal recording artists.

Williams was a great draw at many music societies and events, among them the Orpheus Club of Springfield, Massachusetts, from the 1890s until his death in 1918.

Evans died on 24 May 1918 in Akron, Ohio from blood poisoning, the result of an infected boil. He was buried in East Akron Cemetery.

== Family ==
Evan Williams was married on October 18, 1888 to Margaret Jane née Morgan "Nona" Williams in Thomastown, Ohio. She was the daughter of Welsh immigrant parents Levi Morgan and Ann Williams. They had four children:

- Vernon (1889–1945) was also a tenor and voice teacher.
- Edgar (1892–1963) was a lawyer.
- H. Evan Jr (1899–1954) became a newspaper journalist.
- Gwendolyn (1909–1972).

H. Evan Williams had five grandchildren, the last of whom Edgar Morgan Williams Jr died in Cambridge, Maryland on 12/7/2024. He also has 13 great-grandchildren.

== Recordings ==
Williams voice recorded prodigiously for the Victor Talking Machine Company and he was reported to be the Victor Company's third most popular recording artist after Enrico Caruso and John McCormack as ranked by total record sales. His two best selling titles were "Open the Gates of the Temple" and "A Perfect Day". For two publicly available (pre-1923) recordings of his singing, click "Just a-Wearyin' for You" on YouTube and "A Perfect Day" on YouTube—both composed by Carrie Jacobs-Bond (1862–1946). Evan Williams also made many records for Victor's British affiliate, His Master's Voice.

== Legacy ==
According to his obituary in The New York Times, Williams was fondly remembered for his singing of "Tim Rooney's at the Fighting" to audiences of soldiers during World War I. H. Evan Williams is buried in Ohio's East Akron Cemetery in the Williams family plot. The gravestone on Evan Williams’ grave reads:

God grew near to his children through the singing heart of Evan Williams. A world that laughs and loves and sings has enshrined the memory of this gentle soul whose song restored and brightened the deep places.

An antique oil portrait of Evan Williams was given in 2009 by his descendants to the University of Akron. In his lifetime Evan Williams was sculpted by the famous American sculptor Jo Davidson. (It was said at the time about celebrities that they were not truly famous unless Davidson had sculpted them.)

Evan Williams' family house still stands as of 2024. He built the substantial house circa 1914 at 105 Mayfield Avenue in Akron with his record royalties and concert proceeds. It was quite commodious and had a billiard room and a music room with a Mason and Hamlin piano and also a lovely rose garden. After Evan Williams' premature death in 1918, his widow Nona built a smaller house in the side lot at 97 Mayfield Avenue where she subsequently moved. She died in 1944.

Evan Williams performed at the White House at a State Dinner hosted by President and Mrs.Taft in 1910. The Tafts were also from Ohio and were introduced to Williams by U.S. Senator and Mrs. Charles W.F. Dick of Akron, whose daughter Grace Amelia later married Williams's son Edgar Morgan in 1917.
