= Jill Paquette =

Jill J. Paquette
- Also known as: Jill DeZwaan
- Born: Jill Paquette; 1979 (age 46–47); British Columbia, Canada
- Genres: Folk, Christian pop, folk pop, folk rock, roots rock
- Occupations: Singer, songwriter, worship leader
- Instruments: Vocals, piano, guitar
- Years active: 2003–present
- Label: Reunion

Jill Paquette-DeZwaan (born 1979) is a Canadian folk musician and Christian pop singer. She launched her music career in 2003 with her first studio album, Jill Paquette, released by Reunion Records.

== Early life ==
Jill Paquette-DeZwaan was born in Houston, Canada in 1979. She is of French-Canadian and Native American ancestry. Raised in a musical family, Paquette first played piano at age three and began taking classical lessons that extended into her teenage years, eventually learning to play guitar as well. At 17 she attended Prairie Bible College in Alberta where she planned to study ethnomusicology. An impromptu performance during an open-mic night at a local coffeehouse during her first year led her to join a band fronted by classmate Matt Brouwer. Paquette and the band began playing dates around Alberta, and eventually she recorded a demo that made its way to Nashville.

== Music career ==
Her music recording career began in 2003 with her first studio album, Jill Paquette, released July 22, 2003, from Reunion Records. Christianity Today named her as one of the Best New Christian Artists of 2003. She was nominated for two Dove Awards and her debut album was awarded the 2004 Juno Award for Contemporary Christian/Gospel Album of the Year.

Paquette wrote two songs for the 2014 romantic drama The Song –"All I Wanna Be" and the film's title song, "The Song (Awaken Love)." She appears in the film singing "I Love You Truly," which is also featured on the film's soundtrack.

== Discography ==
- Jill Paquette (July 22, 2003, Reunion)
- Word of Mouth (2005, Self-release)
- Coming Home (February 23, 2010, Catapult)
- Crimson (March 21, 2018, Catapult)
