= Ah! May the Red Rose Live Alway =

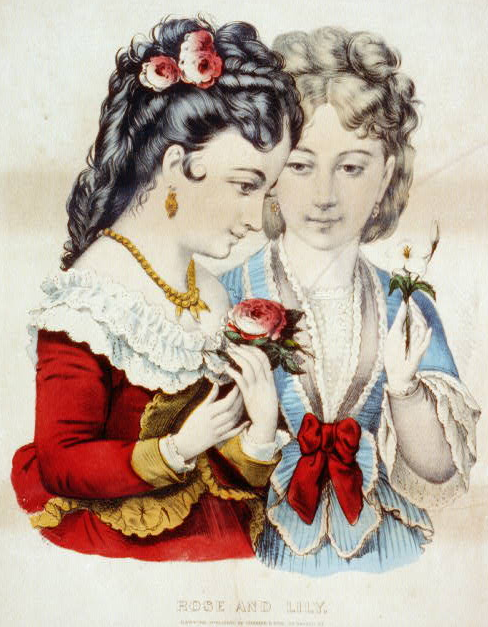

Song
- Published: 1850
- Genre: Parlor song
- Songwriter: Stephen Foster

Ah! May the Red Rose Live Alway is a song written and composed by Stephen Foster in 1850. This song is written in the style of a parlor ballad – a genre of popular song at the time intended to be performed at a slow tempo and to communicate a sentimental quality.

== Description ==
Stephen Foster's "Ah! May the Red Rose Live Alway!" is different from Foster's minstrel songs of the same period. This song is an example of a parlor ballad. This ballad may have roots in the Anglo-Scots-Irish song tradition. Foster's "Ah! May the Red Rose Live Alway!" is similar to Irish musician Thomas Moore's "The Last Rose of Summer".

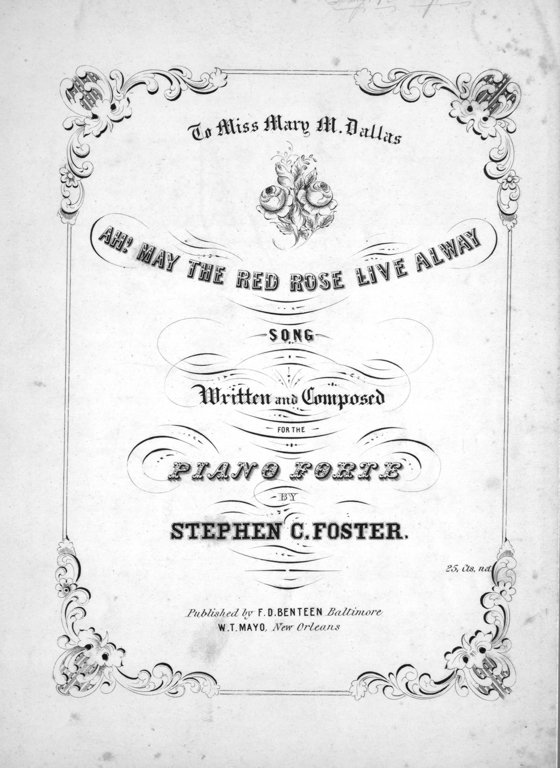
Ah May the Red Rose Live Alway

The song begins with a piano introduction. The first vocal line of "Ah! May the Red Rose Live Alway!" begins on a high note that is held with a fermata. Music historians have postulated that this may give the setting an image of stalling the passage of time. Foster has placed additional fermatas throughout the song, possibly with similar effects in mind. Also of interest is Foster's use of the marking ad lib in several places in the song. This flexibility allotted to the singer is atypical from Foster's usual preference of precise, literally exact note for note, interpretations. Thus, the ad lib designation was scarcely used by Foster and can, in fact, be found in only two of the composer's previous songs: "Mary Loves the Flowers" (1850) and "Jeanie with the Light Brown Hair" (1854).

Foster may have anticipated that the publication of his parlor songs helped to improve his notoriety, but the ballads did not generate the hoped-for income when compared to his minstrel songs. Foster recorded that "Ah! May the Red Rose Live Alway!" had earned $8.12 in royalties over a seven-year period in his ledger. As a result, Foster concentrated more on minstrel songs, which returned ten times more than parlor songs. Foster did return to writing parlor songs in 1860, most notably "Beautiful Dreamer," published in 1864 just after the composer's death.

While not as well known as many of Foster's other popular tunes, the song features prominently in arranger Robert Russell Bennett's A Commemoration Symphony - "Stephen Foster"- the first three movements are purely orchestral, but the four-part chorus appears in grandeur in movement IV (Allegro Quasi Recitativo) with "Ah! May the Red Rose Live Alway." The arrangement retains all of Foster's fermatas from the printed edition, which lends it both rubato and the sense of timelessness described above.

== Lyrics ==
Ah! may the red rose live alway,
To smile upon earth and sky!
Why should the beautiful ever weep?
Why should the beautiful die?
Lending a charm to every ray
That falls on her cheeks of light,
Giving the zephyr kiss for kiss,
And nursing the dew-drop bright --
Ah! may the red rose live alway,
To smile upon earth and sky!
Why should the beautiful ever weep?
Why should the beautiful die?

Long may the daisies dance the field,
Frolicking far and near!
Why should the innocent hide their heads?
Why should the innocent fear?
Spreading their petals in mute delight
When morn in its radiance breaks,
Keeping a floral festival
Till the night-loving primrose wakes --
Long may the daisies dance the field,
Frolicking far and near!
Why should the innocent hide their heads?
Why should the innocent fear?

Lulled be the dirge in the cypress bough,
That tells of departed flowers!
Ah! that the butterfly's gilded wing
Fluttered in evergreen bowers!
Sad is my heart for the blighted plants --
Its pleasures are aye as brief --
They bloom at the young year's joyful call,
And fade with the autumn leaf:
Ah! may the red rose live alway,
To smile upon earth and sky!
Why should the beautiful ever weep?
Why should the beautiful die?

== Notable Performances ==
- A Commemoration Symphony - "Stephen Foster." Arranged and orchestrated by Robert Russell Bennett; The Pittsburgh Symphony Orchestra; The Mendelssohn Choir of Pittsburgh; William Steinberg, conductor. Everest LPBR 6063, 1960. LP
- "Ah! May the Red Rose Live Alway." On Beautiful dreamer: Robert White sings Stephen Foster. Robert White, tenor; National Philharmonic Orchestra; Charles Gerhardt, conductor. RCA Red Seal RCD1-5853, 1986. CD
- "Ah! May the Red Rose Live Alway." On Songs Of Stephen Foster. Jan DeGaetani (mezzo-soprano), Leslie Guinn (bass), Gilbert Kalish (piano). Electra Nonesuch 9 79158-2, 1987. CD
- "Ah! May the Red Rose Live Always." On Beautiful Dreamer: Songs Of Stephen Foster. Suzy Bogguss, vocals. American Roots Publishing 591594-2, 2004. CD
- "Ah! May the Red Rose Live Alway." On Ashokan Farewell/Beautiful Dreamer: Songs Of Stephen Foster. Thomas Hampson (tenor), Jay Ungar (violin), David Alpher (piano). Classics For Pleasure 0946 3 82225 2 1, 2007. CD

== Archived content ==
Archived copies of the published work is available.

== See also ==
- "My Love is Like a Red, Red Rose" – a Scots song by Robert Burns
- "The Last Rose of Summer" – Irish poem and song by Thomas Moore
