= Just Awearyin' for You =

Song performed by Paul Robeson

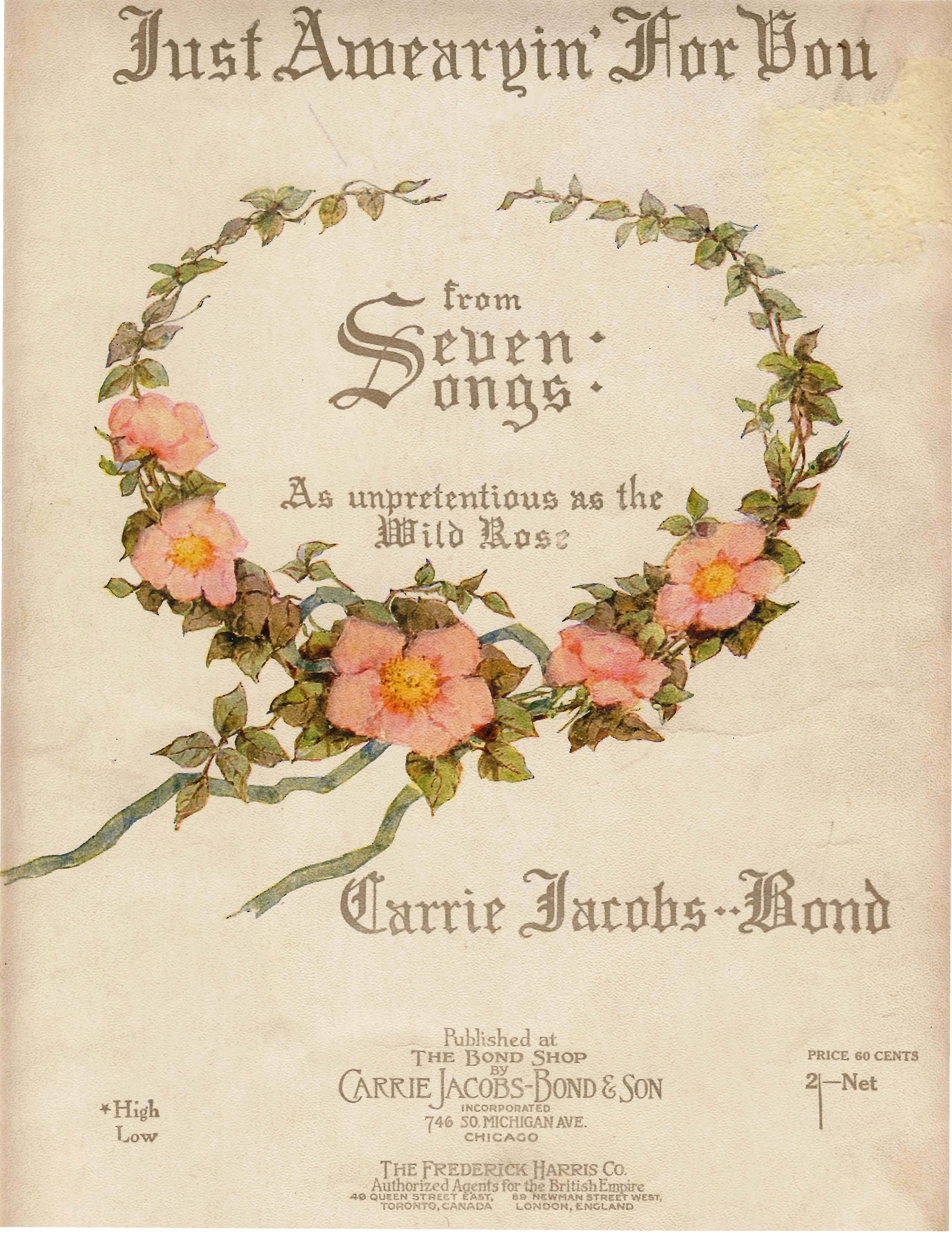
Front cover of "Just Awearyin' for You" (1901), with Jacobs-Bond's artwork

"Just Awearyin' for You"
1911 recording of Elizabeth Spencer (soprano) singing "Just Awearyin' for You" without the "morning" stanza which has the birds' "notes / That come trilling from their throats"

"Just Awearyin' for You"
1911 recording of Evan Williams (tenor) singing "Just Awearyin' for You" with all three stanzas

"Just Awearyin' for You" is a parlor song, one of that genre's all-time hits.

== History ==
The lyrics were written by Frank Lebby Stanton and published in his Songs of the Soil (1894). The tune was composed by Carrie Jacobs-Bond and published as part of Seven Songs as Unpretentious as the Wild Rose in 1901. Harry T. Burleigh also composed a tune (copyrighted in 1906), but it never approached the popularity of the Jacobs-Bond tune. Although Stanton originally wrote the lyrics in dialect ("Jes' a-wearyin' fer you") for a column in the Atlanta Constitution, the song has generally circulated with the more mainstreamed diction of the Jacobs-Bond version.

Sentimental yet artful, "Just Awearyin' for You" has been recorded by numerous performers, including Elizabeth Spencer, Evan Williams, Anna Case, Sophie Braslau, Eleanor Steber, Gladys Swarthout, Thomas Allen and Malcolm Martineau (piano), Johnny Hartman, John Arwyn Davies, Jane Morgan, Peggy Balensuela (mezzo soprano) and William Hughes (piano), Bing Crosby (1934 and 1945) and Paul Robeson. In 1934 Jay Wilbur and his band did a foxtrot rendition.

Set to the key of C, "Just Awearyin' for You" appears in Mel Bay's Modern Guitar Method Grade 6.

Along with "I Love You Truly" and "A Perfect Day", "Just Awearyin' for You" forms the triumvirate of works for which Jacobs-Bond is remembered. A dedicatory phrase "To F. B." atop the musical score (on p. 3 of the sheet music) refers to her second husband, Frederic Bond.

Prior to publication with her tune, Jacobs-Bond was unaware that the lyrics were written by Stanton; she thought them anonymous as indicated in the Chicago newspaper from which she took them. Once the oversight became apparent, Jacobs-Bond resolved the situation amicably with D. Appleton & Company, which had published Stanton's Songs of the Soil, thus providing Stanton with a royalty stream that by his own admission brought him more revenue than everything else in Songs of the Soil combined. "Linger Not" and "Until God's Day" are two other songs on which Stanton and Jacobs-Bond collaborated.
