= The Blue Flag =

Song
- Language: English
- Released: 1917
- Songwriter(s): Carrie Jacobs-Bond

The Blue Flag is a World War I song written and composed by Carrie Jacobs-Bond.

The song was published in 1917 by The Bond Shop in Chicago, Il. The sheet music cover, illustrated by Artist Press, depicts the flag of the 21st Infantry Regiment of the U.S. Army.
