= McKee Trio =

The McKee Orchestra and Trio was an instrumental recording group in American popular music during the 1910s.

For several years the McKee Trio was contracted by the Victor Talking Machine Company (later known as RCA Victor).

Their available recordings include a 1915 rendition of "A Perfect Day" by Carrie Jacobs-Bond (see inset).

"A Perfect Day"
Instrumental rendition of "A Perfect Day" composed by Carrie Jacobs-Bond 1909 performed by the McKee Trio 1915
