= Frank Lebby Stanton =

American writer and lyricist

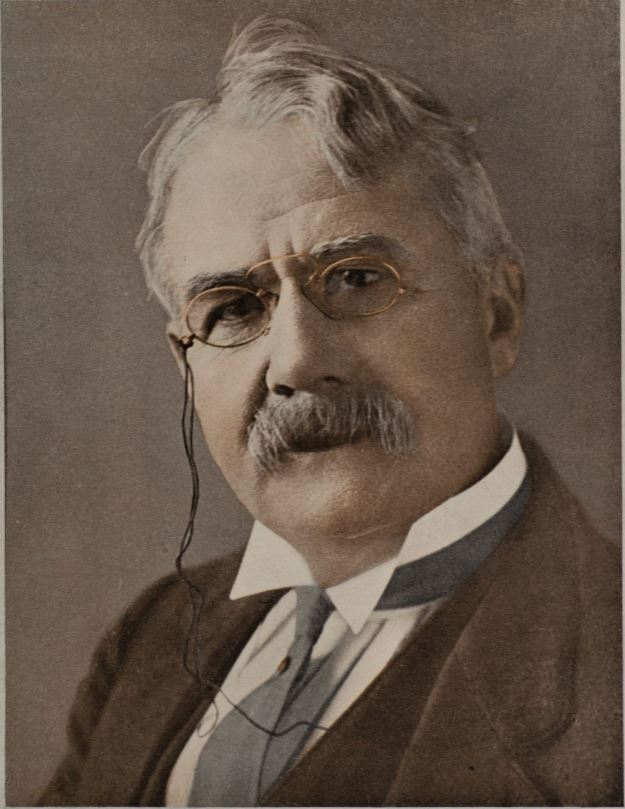
- Stanton, c. 1926
- Born: February 22, 1857; Charleston, South Carolina, United States
- Died: January 7, 1927 (aged 69); Atlanta, Georgia
- Occupations: Poet, lyricist, columnist
- Writing career
- Pen name: Frank L. Stanton; Frank Stanton; F. L. Stanton
- Notable works: "Just Awearyin' for You" "Mighty Like a Rose" ""Morning"
- Literary movement: Early Southern Renaissance

Frank Lebby Stanton (February 22, 1857 – January 7, 1927), frequently credited as Frank L. Stanton, Frank Stanton or F. L. Stanton, was an American lyricist.

He was also the initial columnist for the Atlanta Constitution and became the first poet laureate of the State of Georgia, a post to which he was appointed by Governor Clifford Walker in 1925 and which Stanton held until his death.

== Eminence ==
Stanton was born in Charleston, South Carolina, to Valentine Stanton (a printer, Confederate soldier, and farmer) and his wife Catherine Rebecca Parry Stanton, whose father owned a plantation on Kiawah Island. From early childhood he was influenced by the hymns of Isaac Watts and Charles Wesley and was reared in the Methodist Episcopal Church, South. After starting school in Savannah, Georgia, Frank Lebby Stanton found his education cut off by the American Civil War. At the age of 12 he became apprenticed to a printer, a position which allowed him to enter the newspaper business. In 1887 he met Leone Josey while he was working for the Smithville News; they married and, in 1888, moved to Rome, Georgia, where Frank Lebby Stanton had received an offer from John Temple Graves to serve as night editor for the Rome Tribune. With encouragement from Joel Chandler Harris, Stanton in 1889 switched to the Atlanta Constitution (where for a few months he worked for Henry W. Grady prior to Grady's death), and began to focus more on writing editorials and columns, a newspaper role which he filled from then until Stanton's death in 1927. Stanton's writing became quite popular and assiduously read. His column News from Billville (later Up from Georgia) forms the basis for claims that he was even the prototype for American newspaper columnists. Frank Lebby Stanton died, aged 69, in Atlanta, Georgia. He and Leone Josey Stanton were survived by their children—Marcelle Stanton Megahee and Frank Lebby Stanton Jr.

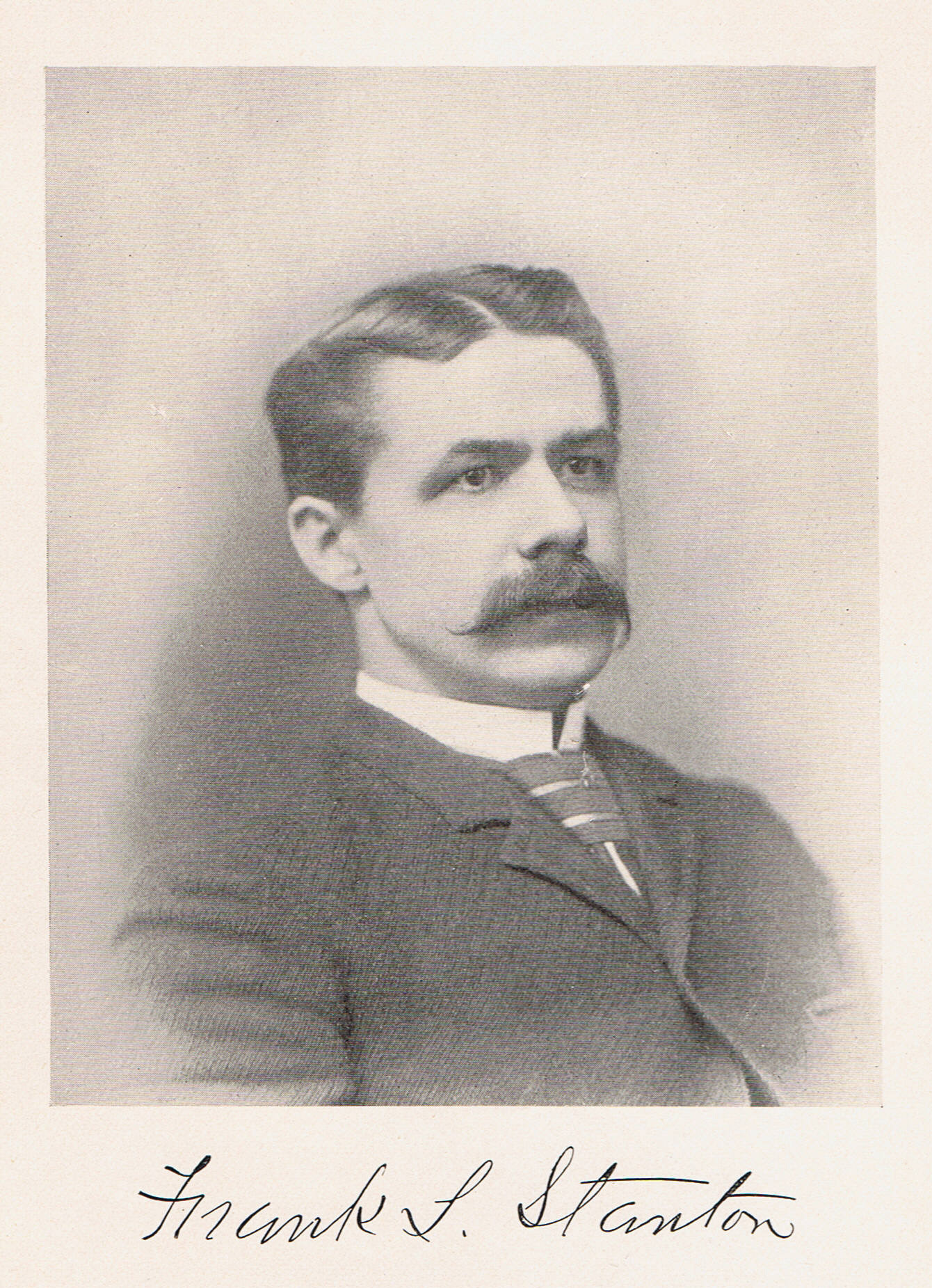
Stanton c. 1892

== Verse ==
Frank Lebby Stanton's verse is marked by simplicity and charm as well as sentimentality which was then en vogue. His poems include a number which he wrote in dialect, a challenge for which he had special knack, such as "Mighty Lak a Rose" (which was set to music by Ethelbert Nevin [1862–1901]). The music for "A Plantation Ditty" (first line "De gray owl sing fum de chimbly top") by Stanton was composed by Sidney Homer. Several of Stanton's ballads were set to music by Oley Speaks. Possibly Stanton's most successful hit in popular music was his lyrics for the wildly selling 1901 parlor song "Awearyin' for You" for which Carrie Jacobs-Bond provided the familiar tune. "Linger Not" and "Until God's Day" are two other songs on which Stanton and Jacobs-Bond collaborated.

== Productivity ==
According to the Online Computer Library Center (OCLC), Stanton's writings include 171 items in 309 publications in 3 languages and 1,483 library holdings" (OCLC WorldCat hits).

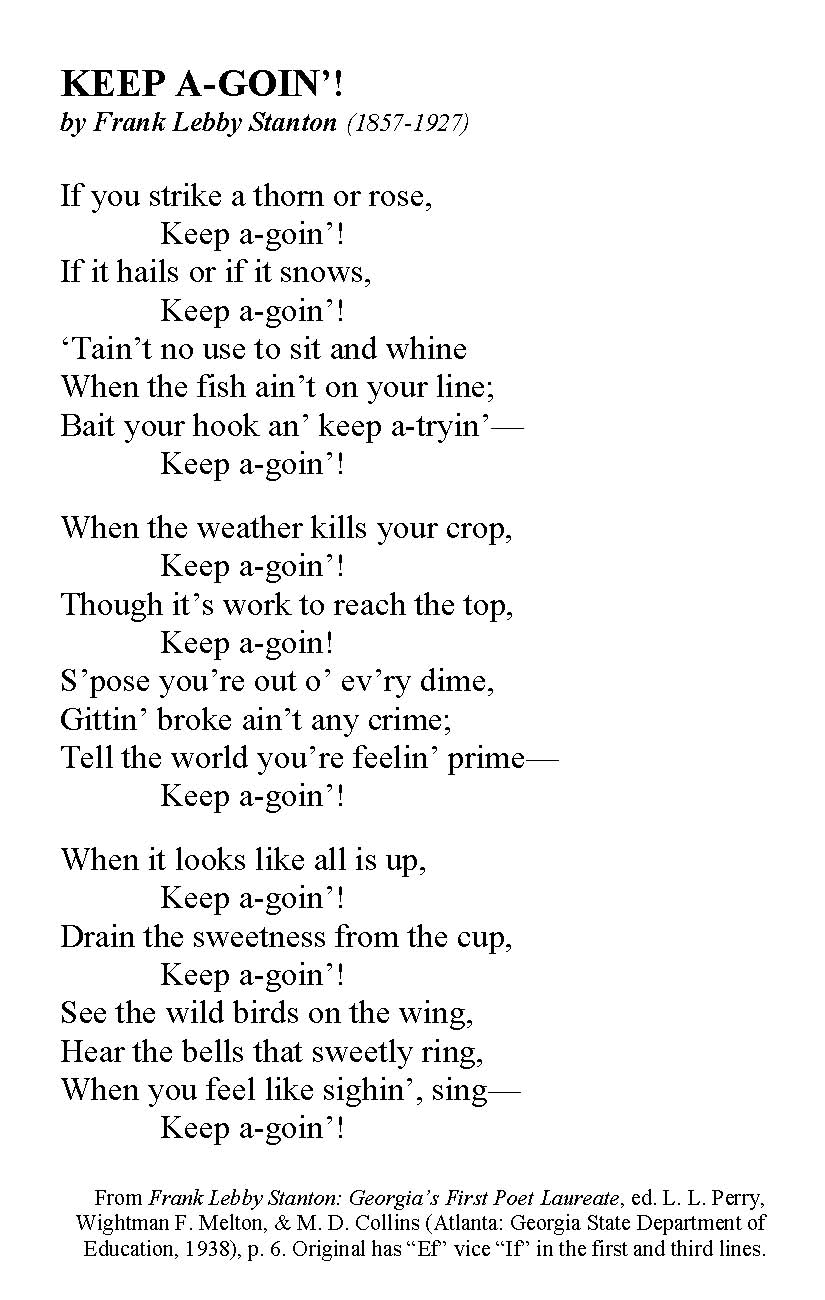
Stanton's familiar poem of optimism and encouragement

Collections of his work are listed by Connecticut State Library, Valdosta State University, University of Rochester (Eastman School of Music), and Music Australia.

On many occasions, leading to his selection as poet laureate, Stanton was called on to furnish poetry for occasions of state, one of them being the opening of Atlanta's Cotton States and International Exposition (1895). On 1916 February 23, the day after Stanton's 59th birthday, public schools throughout Georgia held commemorations of his achievements. Walker, in appointing Stanton Georgia's poet laureate, stated that no one had ever previously been appointed poet laureate of any southern state.

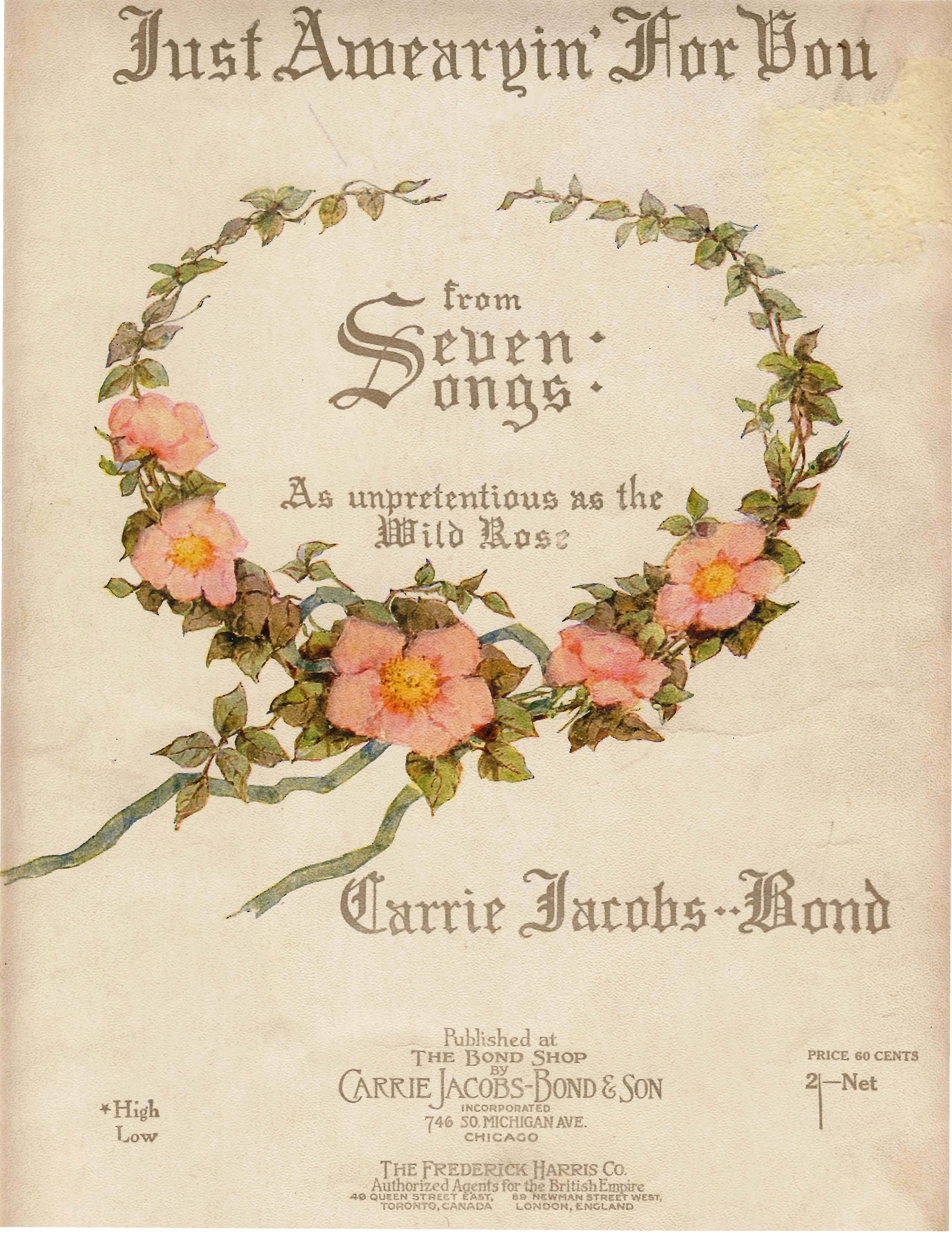
Stanton wrote the lyrics of "Just Awearyin' for You" and Carrie Jacobs-Bond the music. In the first edition's frontispiece, credit to Stanton is missing. He was often remiss in protecting his work, and only after publication did Jacobs-Bond become aware of Stanton's authorship of what had been printed as an anonymous poem by a Chicago newspaper. Stanton's name was added to the score, and Jacobs-Bond amicably began paying him a revenue stream which became his most lucrative source of royalties.

== Legacy ==
Stanton has been frequently compared with Indiana's James Whitcomb Riley or called "the James Whitcomb Riley of the South"; Stanton and Riley were close friends who frequently traded poetic ideas. Although Stanton frequently wrote in the dialect of black southerners and poor whites, he was an opponent of the less-admirable aspects (such as lynching) of the culture in which he lived, and he tended to be compatible in philosophy with the southern progressivism of his employer, the Atlanta Constitution, for which he wrote editorials. These and other characteristics of Stanton are well elaborated in the scholarly essays on him by Francis J. Bosha and Bruce M. Swain.

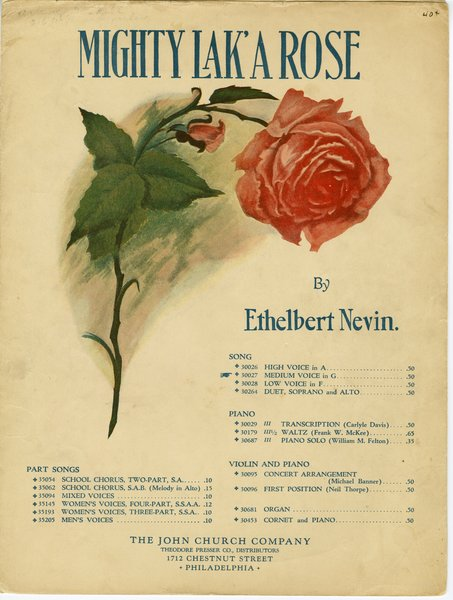
Multi-voice-ranges 1901 cover of Ethelbert Nevin's tune for "Mighty Lak' a Rose" for which Stanton wrote the lyrics. The dialect title means (approximately) "very much like a rose" and is supposedly sung by a mother to her young son. The first line, by which the opus is occasionally known, is "Sweetest li'l feller" (sweetest little fellow).

Shortly after his death Stanton was commemorated in the naming of the Frank Lebby Stanton Elementary School, which, after the redesignation of a street name for its eponym still unborn at the time of Stanton's death, is at 1625 Martin Luther King Jr. Drive in Atlanta.

Five items by Stanton appear in Edmund Clarence Stedman's American Anthology 1787–1900, published in 1900:

- "One Country" (Stedman's Item 1286)
- "A Plantation Ditty" (Stedman's Item 1287)
- "The Graveyard Rabbit" (Stedman's Item 1288)
- "The Mocking-Bird" (Stedman's Item 1289)
- "A Little Way" (Stedman's Item 1290)

One of Stanton's works most widely quoted during his lifetime was a quatrain titled "This World"; it is inscribed on his tombstone in Atlanta's Westview Cemetery:

This world we're a'livin' in
Is mighty hard to beat.
You get a thorn with every rose.
But ain't the roses sweet?

== Musical settings of his poetry ==
Stanton collaborated with African American composer Harry Thacker Burleigh in the sheet music for his poem "Jean" (Burleigh composed and harmonized the tune). American composers of art songs such as Ethelbert Nevin and Carrie Jacobs Bond wrote songs to his verses; composer Oley Speaks also set at least four of his poems to music: "The Hills of Dawn", "In Maytime", "Morning", and "When Mabel Sings". Joshua Emdon set his famous "Keep-A' Goin'!"
