= Parlour music =

Type of popular music

- Stylistic origins: opera, chamber music, art song, blackface minstrelsy, folk song
- Cultural origins: 19th-century Europe, North America
- Derivative forms: Much 20th century popular music

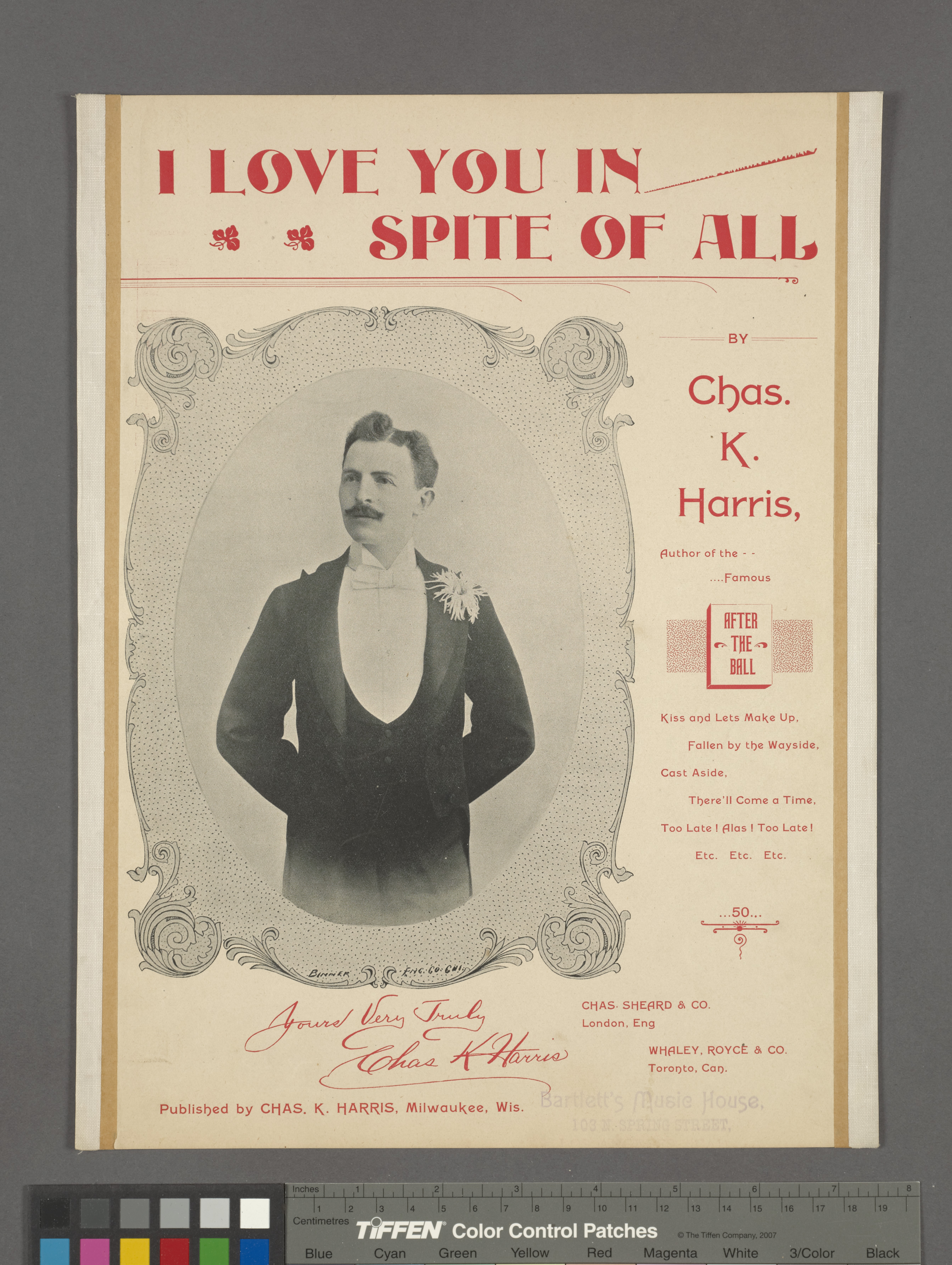
Image of Charles K. Harris, A well regarded composer and song writer of many popular tunes of the time of Parlour music

Parlour music (or parlor music) is a type of popular music which, as the name suggests, is intended to be performed in the parlours of houses, usually by amateur singers and pianists. Disseminated as sheet music, its heyday came in the 19th century, as a result of a steady increase in the number of households with enough resources to purchase musical instruments and instruction in music, and with the leisure time and cultural motivation to engage in recreational music-making. Its popularity faded in the 20th century as the phonograph record and radio replaced sheet music as the most common means for the spread of popular music.

== History ==
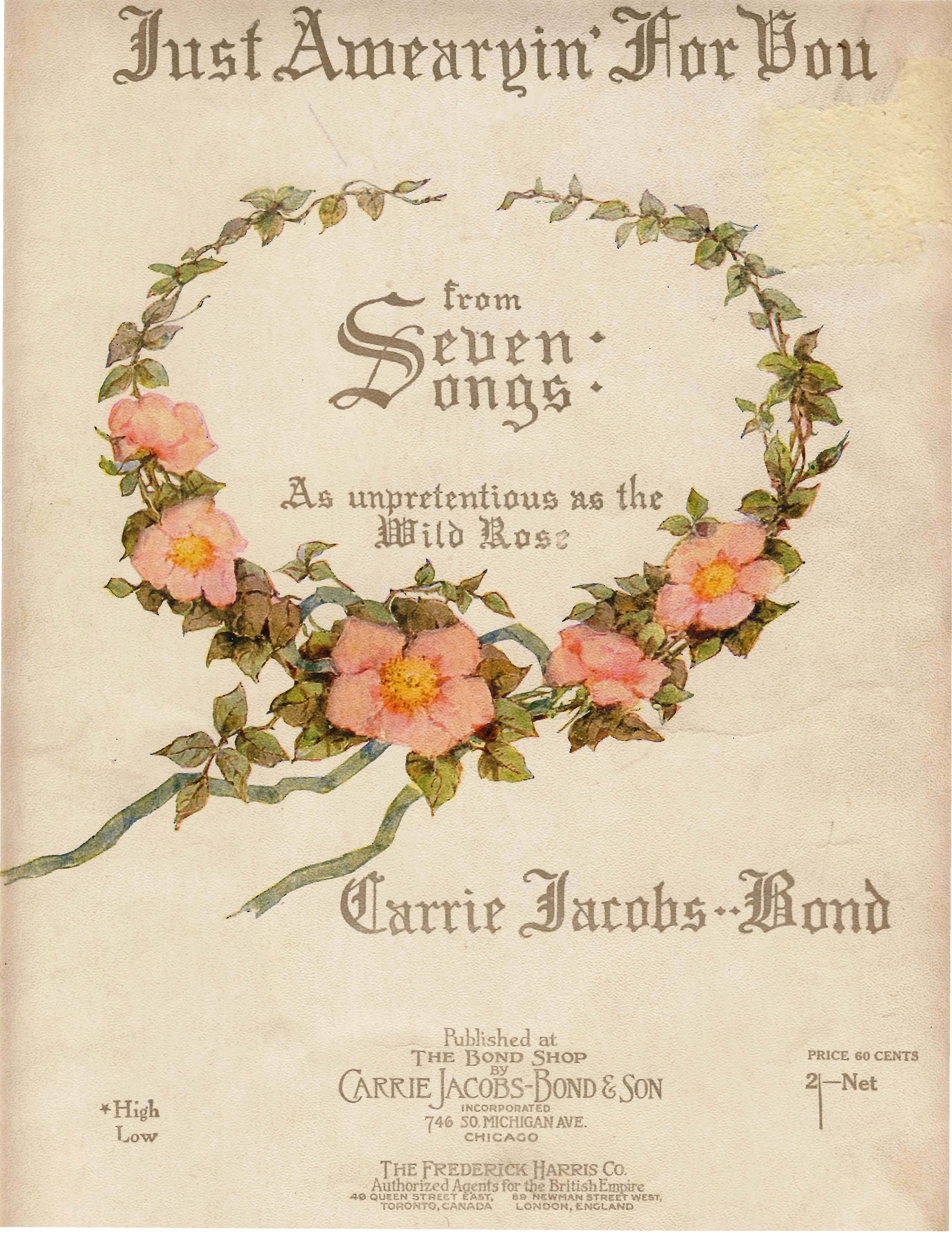
Front cover of "Just Awearyin' for You" (1901), a widely selling parlor song. The lyrics were by Frank Lebby Stanton. Composer Carrie Jacobs-Bond thought they were anonymous but later provided royalties to Stanton. The song typifies the sentimentality of the Victorian and post-Victorian era.

"Just Awearyin' for You"
Sung by Elizabeth Spencer in 1911

Many of the earliest parlour songs were transcriptions for voice and keyboard of other music. Thomas Moore's Irish Melodies, for instance, were traditional (or "folk") tunes supplied with new lyrics by Moore, and many arias from Italian operas, particularly those of Bellini and Donizetti, became parlour songs, with texts either translated or replaced by new lyrics. Many parlour songs of the time were derived from children's folk tunes, and the history of the origin of these folk tunes are heavily debated today. Various other genres were also performed in the parlour, including patriotic selections, religious songs, and pieces written for the musical stage. Excerpts from blackface minstrel shows, arranged for voice and keyboard, were particularly popular. Also, a handful of the better-known art songs, such as Schubert's "Serenade," became part of the parlour repertory. Lyrics written for parlour songs often have sentimental themes, such as love songs or poetic meditations. Fantastical or exuberant themes were also common, as was commentary on incidents and events of the day, such as "Bryan Free Silver March", "Homeless Tonight" or "Shootin' Craps".

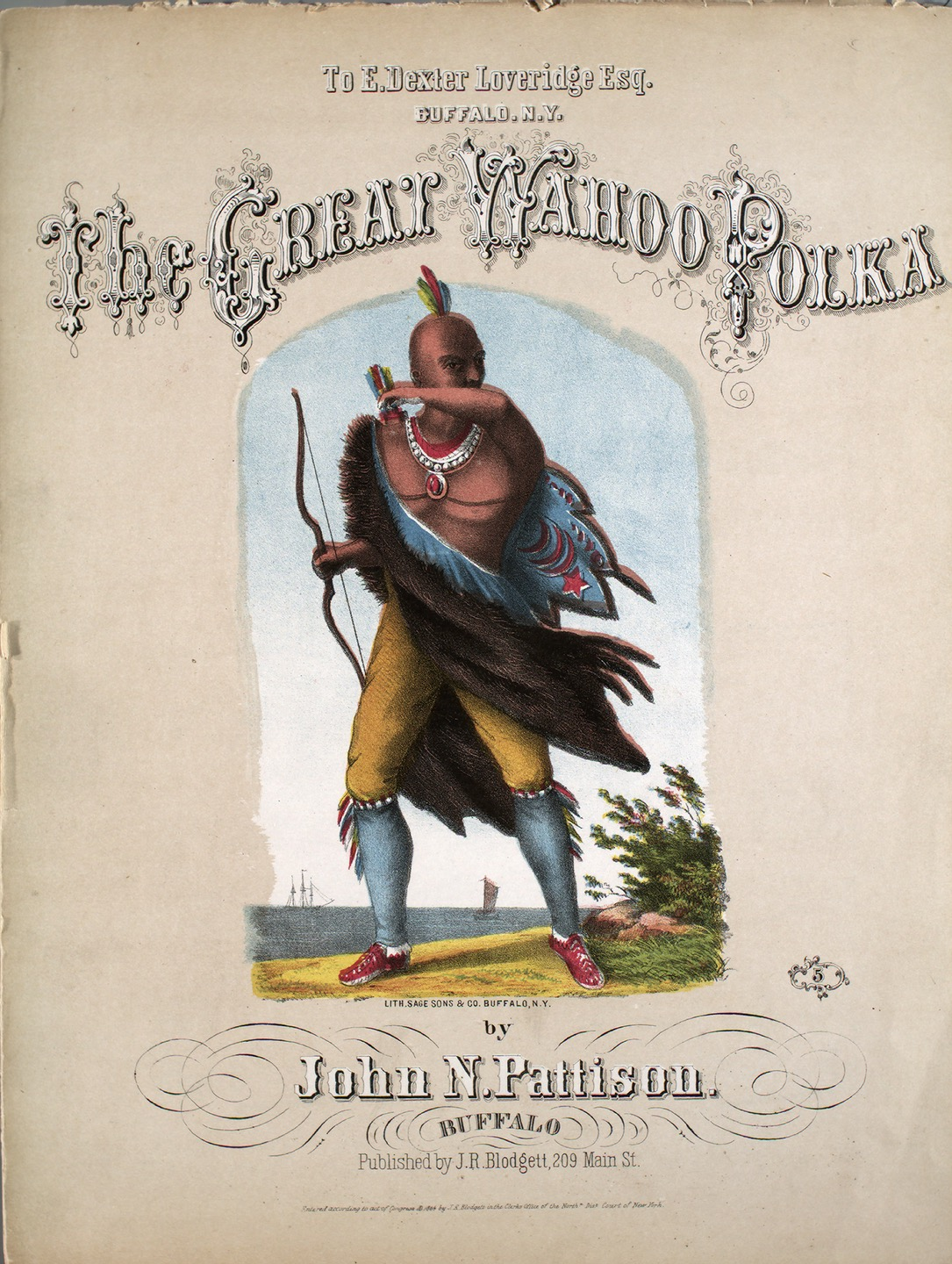
The Great Wahoo Polka, by J.N. Pattison (1864), a dance inspired by the patent remedy "Wahoo Bitters".

As the 19th century wore on, more and more songs were newly composed specifically for use by amateurs at home, and these pieces (written originally as parlour songs, rather than being adapted from other genres) began to develop a style all their own: similar in melodic and harmonic content to art songs of the day, but shorter and simpler in structure and making fewer technical demands on singer and accompanist. Stephen Foster's "Ah! May the Red Rose Live Alway" and "Come with Thy Sweet Voice Again" are early and elegant examples of the genre.

The high point of the parlour song came in the late 19th and early 20th centuries, during the Victorian era in North America and the British Isles. Songs of this genre became more complex and sophisticated in their melodic and harmonic vocabulary, and in addition to their continuing use in the parlour, they were also often sung in public recitals by professional singers. Characteristic and popular parlour songs include "Home, Sweet Home," composed by Henry R. Bishop with lyrics by John Howard Payne, "The Old Arm Chair" by Henry Russell, "When the Swallows Homeward Fly" by Franz Abt, "Kathleen Mavourneen" composed by Frederick Nicholls Crouch with lyrics by Marion Crawford, "The Lost Chord" composed by Arthur Sullivan with lyrics by Adelaide A. Proctor, "Take Back the Heart" by Claribel (Mrs. Charlotte Barnard), "Oh Promise Me" by Reginald de Koven, "I Love You Truly" and "A Perfect Day" by Carrie Jacobs-Bond, and "The Rosary" by Ethelbert Nevin. "Just Awearyin' for You" (see insets) exemplifies the parlor song. Note the sentimental lyrics by Frank Lebby Stanton, the plaintive but well matched tune by Carrie Jacobs-Bond, and the conscious artistry (including the operatic trilled "r"s) by singer Elizabeth Spencer.

In addition to dissemination as individual pieces of sheet music, parlour songs were also collected into anthologies and sold in this format. The most notable collection was Heart Songs, first published in 1909 by Chapple Publishing Company of Boston and repeatedly revised and republished for the following several decades. The publisher claimed that this selection of songs "Dear to the American People" was selected from entries submitted by 25,000 people.

== Parlour chords ==
As described by Peter van der Merwe (1984), in contrast to the chord-based classical music era, 'parlour music' features melodies which are harmonically-independent or not determined by the harmony. This produces parlour chords, many of them added tone chords if not extended such as the dominant thirteenth, added sixth, and major dominant ninth. Rather, the melodies are organized through parlour modes, variants of the major mode with the third, sixth, and seventh emphasized through modal frames such as the mediant-octave mode, which uses the third as a floor and ceiling note, its less common variants the pseudo-phrygian, in which the seventh and often fifth are given prominence, and submediant-octave mode.

Some mediant-octave mode examples are:

- Ludwig van Beethoven's "Turkish March" from "The Ruin of Athens"
- Frédéric Chopin's Waltz in Ab, Op.34, no.1 theme
- Kenneth Alford's "Colonel Bogey March"
- John Philip Sousa's "The Thunderer"
- "The Yellow Rose of Texas"
- "Silent Night"
- Richard Wagner's Tannhäuser's song
- "Rock-a-bye Baby"
- "The Battle Hymn of the Republic"/"John Brown's Body":

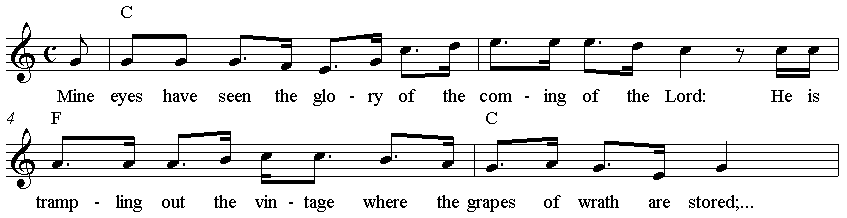

- Wolfgang Amadeus Mozart's Die Zauberflöte, Papageno's Glockenspiel tune:

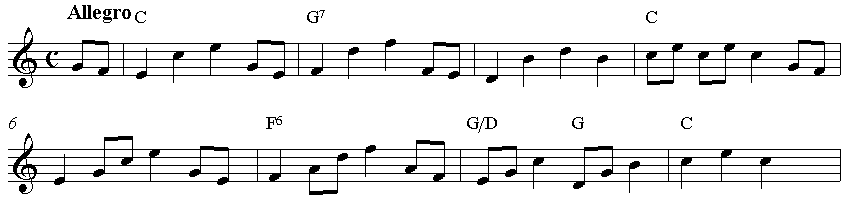

== Literature ==
- Hamm, Charles. Yesterdays: Popular Song in America, 1979. ISBN 0-393-01257-3
- Hamm, Charles (ed.). Heart Songs, 1983. ISBN 0-306-76146-7. (facsimile of original, published in 1909 by The Chappel Publishing Company, Boston).
- van der Merwe, Peter (1989). Origins of the Popular Style: The Antecedents of Twentieth-Century Popular Music. Oxford: Clarendon Press. ISBN 0-19-316121-4.
