= I Love You Truly =

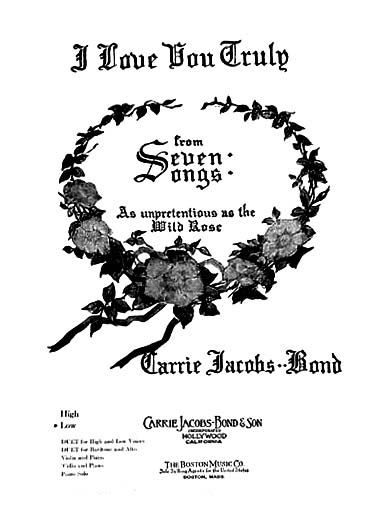
- 1906 sheet music cover

Song
- Published: 1901, 1906, by Carrie Jacobs-Bond & Son
- Genre: Parlor song
- Songwriter: Carrie Jacobs-Bond

"I Love You Truly" is a parlor song written by Carrie Jacobs-Bond. Since its publication in 1901 it has been sung at weddings, recorded by numerous artists, and heard on film and television.

== History ==
Carrie Jacobs-Bond began to write songs in 1894 to supplement the income of her husband, Frank Bond. When he died in 1895, she returned briefly to her hometown of Janesville, Wisconsin, where "I Love You Truly" was written. She then moved to Chicago where she painted china and rented out rooms to make ends meet. There she continued to write songs and eventually sought to publish them herself. With the encouragement and assistance of friends, including a loan from contralto Jessie Bartlett Davis, in 1901 she published a sheet music collection of her compositions called Seven Songs as Unpretentious as the Wild Rose, one of which was "I Love You Truly". She published it again as a separate song in 1906, at the same time correcting an oversight and filing for copyright. It sold over a million copies, one of the earliest songs composed by a woman to achieve that distinction. (Note: Maude Nugent's "Sweet Rosie O'Grady" (1896) was an earlier million-seller; however, Nugent did not own and publish her own song as Jacobs-Bond did.) Jacobs-Bond was invited to sing at the White House by Presidents Theodore Roosevelt, Warren G. Harding, and Calvin Coolidge, and sang "I Love You Truly" each time.

== Lyrics and musical description ==
I Love You Truly
Sung by Elsie Baker, 1912

I love you truly, truly dear,
Life with its sorrow, life with its tear
Fades into dreams when I feel you are near
For I love you truly, truly dear.

Ah! Love, 'tis something to feel your kind hand
Ah! Yes, 'tis something by your side to stand;
Gone is the sorrow, gone doubt and fear,
For you love me truly, truly dear.

"I Love You Truly" has been described as having a "catchy melody... and instantly familiar sound" with a "late-nineteenth century, salon-like character"; it is categorized as a "high-class ballad", a genre of the period applied to serious ballads that were suitable for cultured venues (versus vaudeville). Robert Cummings describes it thus:

The song consists mainly of the melody, its second subject, and repeats. Yet the craftsmanship here is deftly wrought, the melodic goods instantly memorable, and the words sincere and beguilingly innocent.

The piece became a standard at wedding ceremonies, and a mainstay of barbershop harmony arrangers and singers.

== Recordings ==
The song was a hit record for Elsie Baker in 1912 (Victor B-12069).

It has since been recorded by numerous artists, including Sophie Braslau (1916), Dusolina Giannini (1926), Al Bowlly (1934), Bing Crosby (1934 and 1945), Erskine Hawkins (1942), Helen Traubel (1946), Jeanette MacDonald (1947), and as duets by Jo Stafford and Nelson Eddy (1951), and Pat and Shirley Boone (1962).

Film soundtracks include Jill Paquette's cover for the film, The Song (2014).

== Other media ==
- Eugenia Farrar reported that she sang this song, in 1907, along with Just A'Wearying For You, as the first live performance over radio, via Lee de Forest's experimental New York City station.
- As early as 1929 the song was heard in the comedy movie Wise Girls and has since been heard in numerous movies.
- The song was also sung by Bert (Ward Bond) and Ernie (Frank Faylen) as they serenaded George (James Stewart) and Mary Bailey (Donna Reed) on their wedding night in It's a Wonderful Life (1946).
- It was heard in the film I Married a Witch (1942), when it was played by the wedding band and sung by Helen St. Rayner several times.
- In the film Hells Angels on Wheels (1967), the members of the motorcycle gang sing a tuneless, mocking version of the song at the wedding of Abigail and Gypsy.
- In the episode "Here comes the bride--again" (1979) on "Happy Days" Potsie (Anson Williams) sings the song prior to Howard (Tom Bosley) and Marion(Marion Ross) vow renewal.
- In the episode "Till Duck Do Us Part" of Duck Dynasty (2013), Missy Robertson sang it as the processional song for the wedding vow renewal ceremony for Phil and Miss Kay.
- In the romantic drama The Song (2014), the characters Jed and Rose are seen watching this same scene from It’s A Wonderful Life on television, and the song is sung at their wedding by Jill Paquette DeZwaan.

It has also been heard on television sitcoms, often for comic effect. In the first-season episode of I Love Lucy, "The Marriage License" (1952), it was sung by Mrs. Willoughby (Elizabeth Patterson); in the seventh-season episode of All in the Family, "The Unemployment Story: Part 1" (1976), it was sung by Edith Bunker (Jean Stapleton). In the second-season episode of Amen, "Wedding Bell Blues", it was sung repeatedly by the Hetebrink sisters, Amelia (Roz Ryan) and Cassieta (Barbara Montgomery), as a running gag. In the seventh-season episode of Boy Meets World, "It's About Time" (1999), Amy Matthews (Betsy Randle) sang the song.

== See also ==
- List of best-selling sheet music
