= Carrie Jacobs-Bond =

American singer, pianist, and songwriter

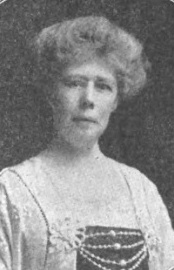

Background information
- Born: Carrie Minetta Jacobs; August 11, 1862; Janesville, Wisconsin
- Died: December 28, 1946 (aged 84) Hollywood
- Instrument: Piano
- Years active: 1890s-early 1940s

Carrie Minetta Jacobs-Bond (August 11, 1862 – December 28, 1946) was an American singer, pianist, and songwriter who composed some 175 pieces of popular music from the 1890s through the early 1940s.

She is perhaps best remembered for writing the parlor song "I Love You Truly", becoming the first woman to sell one million copies of a song. The song first appeared in her 1901 collection Seven Songs as Unpretentious as the Wild Rose, along with "Just Awearyin' for You", which was also widely recorded.

Jacobs-Bond's song with the highest number of sales immediately after release was "A Perfect Day" in 1910. A 2009 August 29 NPR documentary on Jacobs-Bond emphasized "I Love You Truly" together with "Just Awearyin' for You" and "A Perfect Day" as her three great hits.

Jacobs-Bond was inducted into the Songwriters Hall of Fame in 1970.

== Personal life and death ==
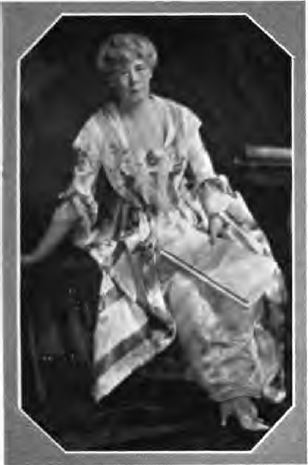
Carrie Jacobs-Bond, photographed in Who's Who Among the Women of California (1922)

Carrie Minetta Jacobs was born in Janesville, Wisconsin, to Dr. Hannibal Jacobs and his wife, Mary Emogene (or Emma) Davis Jacobs and was an only child. She was a distant cousin of John Howard Payne, the lyricist who wrote "Home Sweet Home." Jacobs was born in the house of her maternal grandparents at the corner of Pleasant Street (now W. Court Street) and Oakhill Avenue. Her father died while she was a child, and the family faced financial difficulties without him.

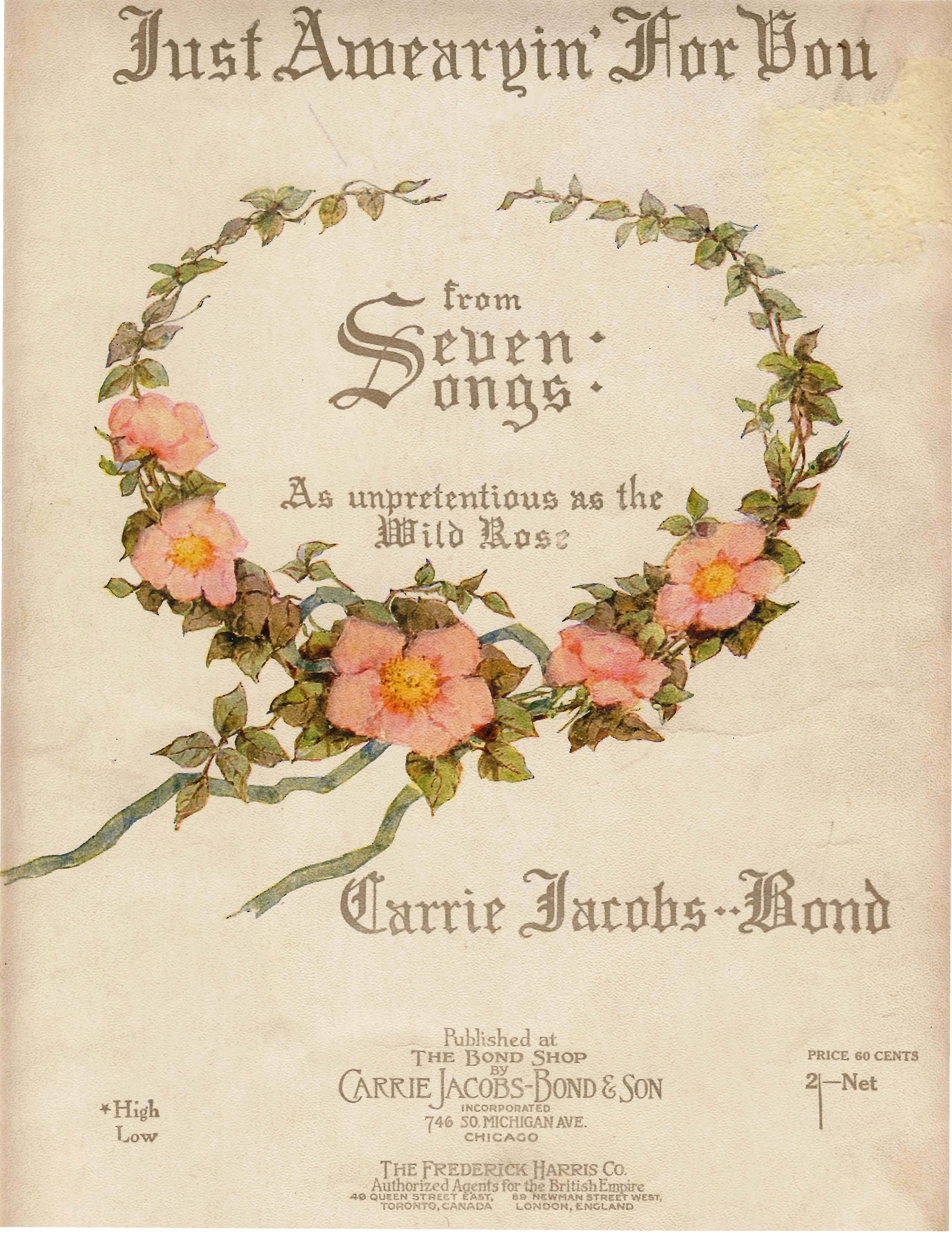
Front cover of "Just Awearyin' for You" (1901), with Jacobs-Bond's artwork, watercolors of the wild rose

Most of Jacobs-Bond's family enjoyed playing music, and her father played the flute. Jacobs-Bond could pick out piano tunes at age 4, she could play some pieces just by hearing them at age 6, and then at age 8 she was able to play Liszt's Second Hungarian Rhapsody just by hearing it. She studied the piano from age 9 to age 17, with the dream to become a songwriter. As a child, she attended classes in the Janesville public school system.

During Jacobs' short-lived first marriage to Edward Smith J. Smith of Janesville, at age 18, her only child, Frederick Jacobs Smith, was born on July 23, 1882. This marriage ended in divorce in 1887.

Her second marriage in 1888 was to her childhood sweetheart, physician Frank Lewis Bond of Johnstown, Wisconsin. They lived in Iron River, Michigan, where she was a homemaker and supplemented the family income with painted ceramics, piano lessons, and her musical compositions. She lived among miners and loggers for several years and when the economy of the iron mining area collapsed, Frank had no money. Struck by a child's snowball, Dr. Bond fell on the ice, and died five days later from crushed ribs in 1895. She was left with debts too large to be covered by the $4,000 in proceeds of his life insurance, and she returned to Janesville. Selling ceramics, running a rooming house, and writing songs did not produce enough money to pay her bills. She slowly sold off their furniture and ate only once per day.

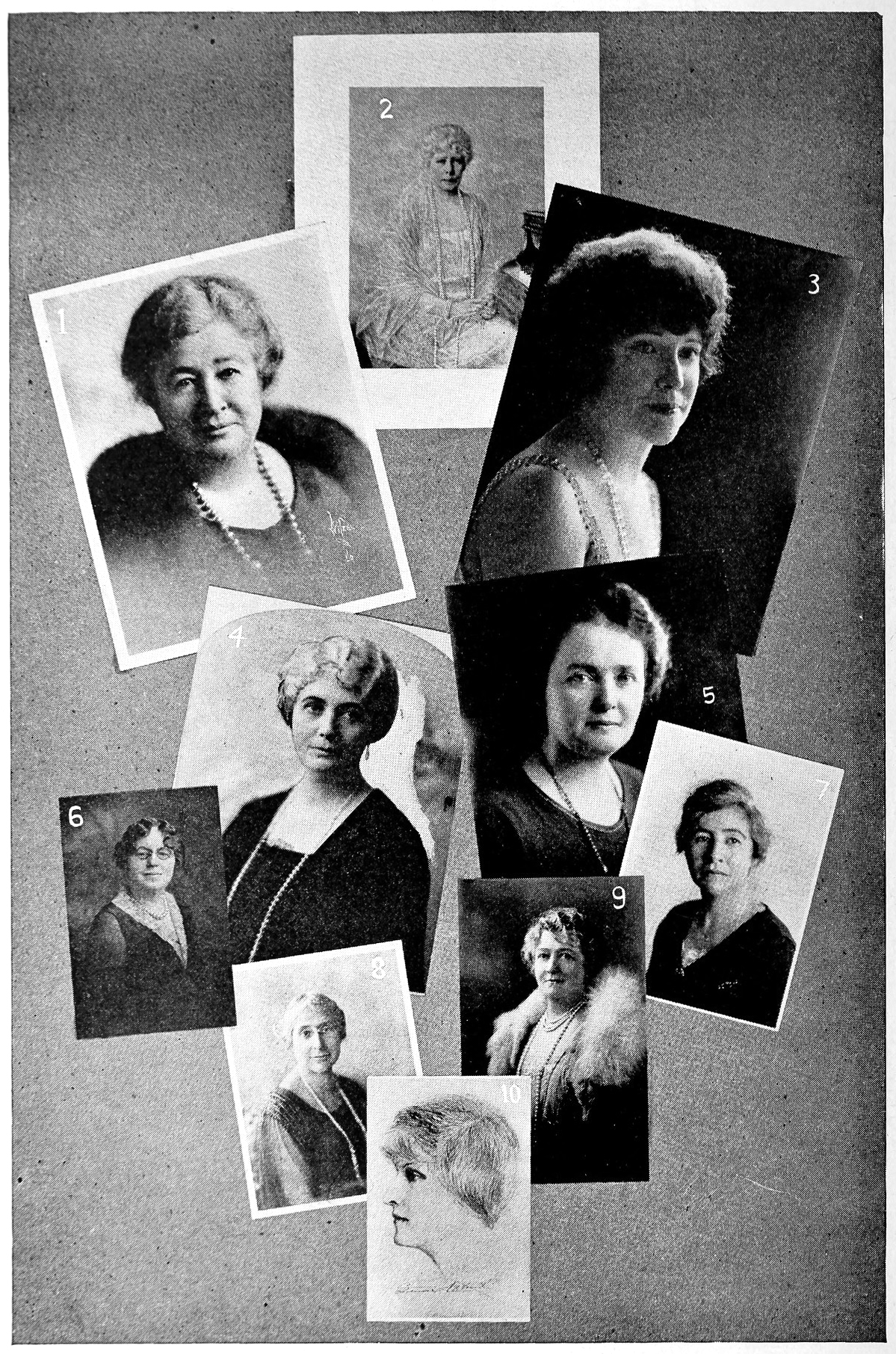
Mariana Bertola, Carrie Jacobs-Bond, May Showler Groves, Minna McGauley, Maud Wilde, Jeanette Lawrence, Miriam Van Waters, David Starr Jordan, Annie Florence Brown, Gertrude Atherton

After achieving some success with her composing, Jacobs-Bond moved with her son to Chicago to be closer to music publishers. For several years while living in Chicago, most of her songs never made the transition from manuscript to being published, so she had to raise money by singing them at social gathering and concerts. Soon she found that people enjoyed her simple and lyrical music. Her lyrics and music exemplified sentimentality, which was intensely popular at that time. Since Jacobs-Bond's attempts to have her music published were repeatedly turned down by the male-dominated music industry of the day, in 1896 she resorted to establishing her own sheet music publishing company. As a result, she was one of very few women in the industry, and perhaps the only one, to own every word of every song she wrote. Her publishing company changed location eight times, finally settling in Hollywood, California, which is where she and her son moved to in the early 1920s to help ease the pains of her rheumatism, where she continued performing and publishing.

She named her home there "The End of the Road" (also the title of her 1940 book). She was an early supporter of the Theatre Arts Alliance, which created the Hollywood Bowl near her home. Jacobs-Bond died in her Hollywood home of a cerebral hemorrhage on December 28, 1946, at the age of 85. She is buried in the "Court of Honor" at Forest Lawn Memorial Park Cemetery in Glendale, California.

== Poetry and art ==
Jacobs-Bond also published books of children's poetry and an autobiography. Her autobiography The Roads of Melody was published in 1927. She drew the artwork for her sheet music covers. The wild rose, her trademark artwork, appears on many of her publications.

== Legacy and honors ==
Former U.S. President Herbert Hoover wrote in her epitaph: "Beloved composer of 'I Love You Truly' . . . and a hundred other heart songs that express the loves and longings, sadness and gladness of all people everywhere . . . who met widowhood, conquered hardship, and achieved fame by composing and singing her simple romantic melodies. She was America's gallant lady of song." The Los Angeles City Council honored her as "one of America's greatest women."

== Music career ==
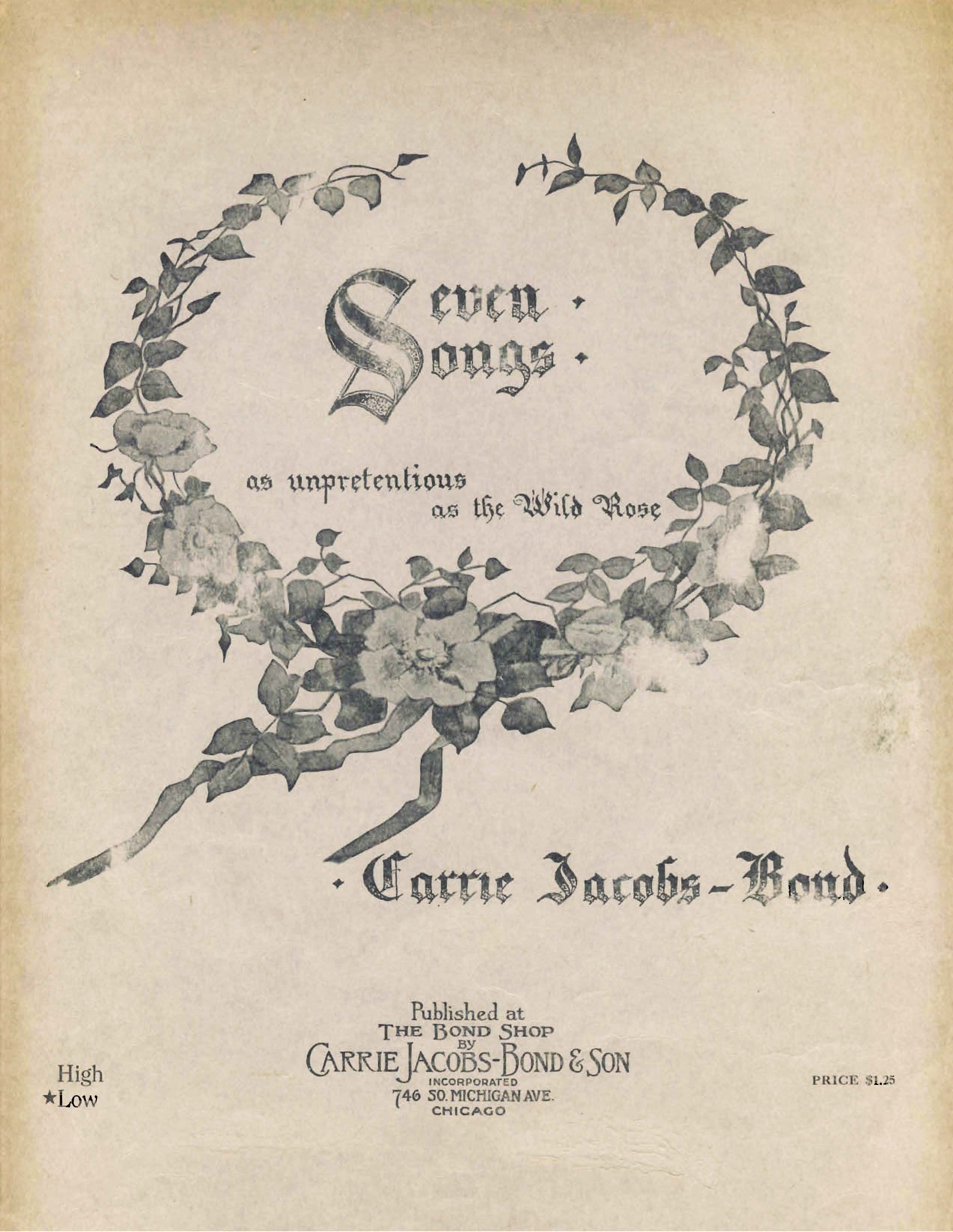
1901 front cover of Seven Songs as Unpretentious as the Wild Rose, bearing the imprint of the Bond Shop in Chicago

Jacobs-Bond studied piano with area teachers while a child. A performer named Blind Tom Wiggins toured the country, instantly memorizing any song played to him and then playing it back. After his part of the program, young Jacobs was prodded to go to the piano. She awed the crowd by playing back Blind Tom's song. She began writing music in the late 1880s when encouraged by her husband to "put down on paper some of the songs that were continually running through my mind." After her return from Iron River, Michigan, and the death of her second husband, she took up residence at 402 East Milwaukee Street, Janesville, Wisconsin, where she wrote the song "I Love You Truly".

A young female singer who lived across the hall from Jacobs-Bond had to leave unexpectedly, so she asked Jacobs-Bond to entertain her manager and another man. When the two men arrived, Jacobs-Bond invited the men into her apartment. The manager, Victor P. Sincere, saw some of her manuscripts lying around and asked whether she had written them. After Jacobs-Bond said yes, Sincere asked her to perform a song;, so she played "I Love You Truly" for him. When he asked whether she would like to have the song performed in public, she answered "no" because she had not copyrighted the song, and someone could steal it. Jacobs-Bond had second thoughts, so she went to the telephone at the corner drugstore and called opera star Jessie Bartlett Davis, even though they had never met. Jacobs-Bond hoped that Davis would make the song as popular as she had "Oh Promise Me" (by Reginald De Koven and Clement Scott) in 1898. Davis volunteered to pay the cost to publish Seven Songs as Unpretentious as the Wild Rose.

After moving to Chicago, Jacobs-Bond slowly gathered a following by singing in small recitals in local homes. She published her first collection with the help of opera star Jessie Bartlett Davis. Seven Songs: as Unpretentious as the Wild Rose, which was released in 1901, included two of her most enduring songs—"I Love You Truly" and "Just Awearyin' for You". The success of Seven Songs allowed Jacobs-Bond to expand her publishing company, known as the Bond Shop, which she had originally opened with her son in her apartment in Janesville. Before the end of 1901, David Bispham augmented Jacobs-Bond's celebrity by giving a recital of exclusively Jacobs-Bond songs in Chicago's Studebaker Theatre. Within a few years and with the help of her friends, Jacobs-Bond performed for Theodore Roosevelt. She gave a recital in England (with Enrico Caruso) and a series of recitals in New York City.

She collaborated with American poet Paul Laurence Dunbar. In 1906 they published five songs with lyrics by Dunbar and music by Jacobs-Bond.

In 1910 she published "A Perfect Day", for which 25 million copies of the sheet music were sold. It was the most popular of her compositions during her lifetime although "I Love You Truly" was more frequently performed later.

During World War I Jacobs-Bond gave concerts in Europe for U.S. Army troops. "A Perfect Day" was especially popular among them.

She was invited again to Washington to perform at a White House State Dinner given by President Harding for the Members of the Supreme Court on February 2, 1922.

Carrie Jacobs-Bond was the most successful woman composer of her day, by some reports earning more than $1 million in royalties from her music before the end of 1910. In 1941, the General Federation of Women's Clubs cited Jacobs-Bond for her contributions to the progress of women during the 20th century.

One of her final compositions titled Because of the Light was published in December 1944, when she was 82. Composer Rolande Maxwell Young later revised and updated some of Jacobs-Bond's songs for Boston Music Co.

Jacobs-Bond's life and lyrics serve as testimony to her resilience in overcoming hardships such as poverty, her father's early death, her divorce, her second husband's death, and her son's suicide in 1932 while listening to "A Perfect Day" on the phonograph.

== Published works ==
=== Sheet music ===
- Almost Impossible
- The Angelus
- At Morning, Noon and Night
- A Bad Dream
- Because I Am Your Friend
- Because of the Light
- Betty's Music Box.
- The Bird Song
- Birds
- The Blue Flag, 1917
- But I Have You
- California
- Chimney Swallows
- Come, Mr. Dream-maker, 1897
- Compensation
- Consolation
- A Cottage in God's Garden
- The Crimson-Breasted Bird
- Cupid's Home
- The Dark Lament
- The Dear Auf Wiedersehn
- De Las' Long Res', 1901
- Des Hold My Hands Tonight, 1901
- Do You Remember, 1915
- The Elopement
- The End of a Perfect Day
- Evening, My Love and You
- First Ask Yourself
- The Flying Flag
- The Forget Me Not
- The Free Concert
- The Gate of Tears
- God Remembers When the World Forgets, 1913
- Going to Church with Mother
- The Golden Key
- The Good Folk
- Good Night
- Got to Practice, 1917
- The Hand of You
- Happy Lil Sal
- Have You Seen My Kitty?
- His Buttons Are Marked 'U.S.', 1902
- His Lullaby
- Hollyhocks
- Homeland
- A Hundred Years from Now, 1914
- Hush-a-by
- I Love You Truly, 1901 & 1906
- I was Dreaming... Maybe
- If I Could Hear Your Voice Again
- I'm the Captain of the Broom Stick Cavalry, 1890
- In a Foreign Land
- In Dear Hawaii, 1908
- In My Garden
- In the Meadow, 1925
- Is My Molly Dead?, 1895
- Is Yo'? Yo' Is, 1905
- I've Done My Work, 1920
- Jesus Is Calling
- June and December
- Just Awearyin' for You, 1901
- Just by Laughing
- Just Lonesome
- Keep Awake
- Know and Find
- Lazy River
- Life's Garden
- The Lily and the Rose
- Linger Not
- A Little Bit O'Honey, 1917
- The Little House
- Little Lost Youth of Me.
- A Little Pink Rose, 1912
- A Little Shoe
- Lively Hour
- Long Time Ago
- Longing
- Look Up
- Love and Sorrow
- Lovely Hour
- Love's Sacred Trust
- The Lure
- May I Print a Kiss?
- Memories of Versailles Waltz
- A Memory
- Men and Women
- Morning and Evening
- Mother Mine
- Mother's Cradle Song, 1895
- Mother's Three Ages of Man
- Movin' in de Bes' Soci'ty.
- My Dear
- My Garden of Memory
- My Son!
- My Soul
- The Naughty Little Girl
- Nothin' but Love!
- Nothing but a Wild Rose
- Now and Then
- O Haunting Memory.
- O Time Take Me Back, 1916
- Old Friends of Mine
- Out in the Fields
- Over Hills and Fields of Daisies
- The Pansy and the Forget-Me-Not
- Parting, 1901
- A Perfect Day, 1910
- Play Make Believe
- Please
- Remember to Forget
- Robin Adair
- Roses Are in Bloom
- The Sandman, 1912
- Shadows, 1901
- A Sleepy Song
- Smile a Little
- Someone I Love is Coming
- A Song of the Hills
- The Soul of You
- Still Unexprest', 1901
- Stop and Sing
- A Study in Symbols
- Sunshine (Po Li'l Lamb)
- Ten Thousand Times Ten Thousand
- There Is a Way
- Through the Mists
- Through the Years, 1918
- Time Make All but Love the Past
- Tis Summer in Thine Eyes
- To-Day.
- To My Valentine, 1926
- To the Savior Called
- To the Victor (March)
- To Understand
- Trouble
- Two Lovers
- Tzigani Dances
- Until Death
- Until God's Day
- A Vision
- Walking in Her Garden
- Waltz of the Wild Flowers, 1916
- The Way of the World
- We Are All Americans, 1918
- Were I
- When Church is Out
- When do I Want You Most?
- When God Puts Out the Light
- When I am Dead, My Dearest
- When I Bid the World Goodnight
- When My Ships Come to Me
- When You're Sad
- Where Youth's Eternal
- Who is True?
- Why
- Write to Me Often, Dear, 1896
- Your Song

=== Song books ===
- Eleven Songs, 1897
  - Mother's Cradle Song
  - Write to Me Often, Dear
  - Come, Mr. Dream-Maker
  - The Pansy and the Forget Me Not
  - Who is True
  - June and December
  - Someone I Love Is Coming
  - Through the Mists
  - Until Death
- Four Songs, 1899
  - A Little Shoe
  - Have You Seen My Kitty?
  - The Bird Song
  - When My Ships Come Home
- Seven Songs as Unpretentious as the Wild Rose, 1901
  - Shadows w.m. Jacobs-Bond, pp. 3–5
  - Parting w. William Ordway Prestridge m. Jacobs-Bond, pp. 6–7
  - Just Awearying for You w. Frank Lebby Stanton m. Jacobs-Bond, pp. 8–9
  - De Las' Long Res' w. Paul Laurence Dunbar m. Jacobs-Bond, p. 10
  - I Love You Truly w.m. Jacobs-Bond, p. 11
  - Still Unexprest w.m. Jacobs-Bond, pp. 12–13
  - Des Hold My Hands Tonight w.m. Jacobs-Bond, pp. 14–15
- Two Songs, 1902
  - May I Print a Kiss
  - Two Lovers
- Twelve Songs, 1902
  - A Bad Dream
  - I Was Dreaming... Maybe
  - Linger Not
  - Love's Sacred Trust
  - Mother's Three Ages of Man
  - Over Hills and Fields of Daisies
  - The Dear Auf Wiedersehn
  - Time Make All But Love the Past
  - When I Am Dead, My Dearest
  - When I Bid the World Goodnight
- Three Songs, 1904
  - Nothing But a Wild Rose
  - The Angelus
  - Walking in Her Garden
- Ten Songs, 1905
  - In a Foreign Land
  - Just By Laughing
  - Men and Women
  - My Dearest Dear
  - When Do I Want You Most?
  - Where to Build Your Castles
- Two Songs, 1907
  - Happy Lil Sal
  - Trouble
- Half Minute Songs or Miniature Songs, 1910
  - Making the Best of It
  - First Ask Yourself
  - To Understand
  - Doan' Yo' Lis'n
  - How to Find Success
  - The Pleasure of Giving
  - Answer the First Rap
  - A Good Exercise
  - A Present From Yourself
  - Now and Then
  - When They Say the Unkind Things
  - Keep Awake
- The Smile Songs, 1910
  - Know and Find
  - Look Up
  - Mother Mine
  - Please
  - A Memory
  - Smile a Little
  - Stop and Sing
  - The Good Folk
  - The Way of the World
  - There Is a Way
  - Why
  - Almost Impossible
- Little Kitchen Songs and Stories, 1911
- Thirty Songs: Songs Everybody Sings, about 1927

=== Autobiography ===
Jacobs-Bond, Carrie. The Roads of Melody: My Story. New York: D. Appleton and Company, 1927. 224 pp.

=== Poetry ===
Jacobs-Bond, Carrie (1921). Tales of Little Dogs. Chicago: P.F. Volland Co. OCLC 2593983.
Jacobs-Bond, Carrie (1926). A perfect day and other poems: from the songs of Carrie Jacobs Bond. Chicago: P.F. Volland Co. OCLC 16702810.
Jacobs-Bond, Carrie (1940). Palmer, Jamie (ed.). The End of the Road. Hollywood, CA: George Palmer Putnam. ISBN 1-4191-2942-2.

=== Short stories ===
Jacobs-Bond, Carrie (1930). The little monkey with the sad face and other stories. New York: John Day Co. OCLC 2559682.

'I Love You Truly'
Sung by Elsie Baker, 1912

"Just Awearyin' for You"
1911 recording of Elizabeth Spencer (soprano) singing "Just Awearyin' for You" (w. Frank Lebby Stanton m. Carrie Jacobs-Bond)

"Just Awearyin' for You"
1911 recording of Evan Williams (tenor) singing "Just Awearyin' for You"

'A Perfect Day'
Instrumental-only rendition by the McKee Trio, 1915
