= The Garden of Mystery =

1925 American opera in one act by Charles Wakefield Cadman

- Opera by Charles Wakefield Cadman
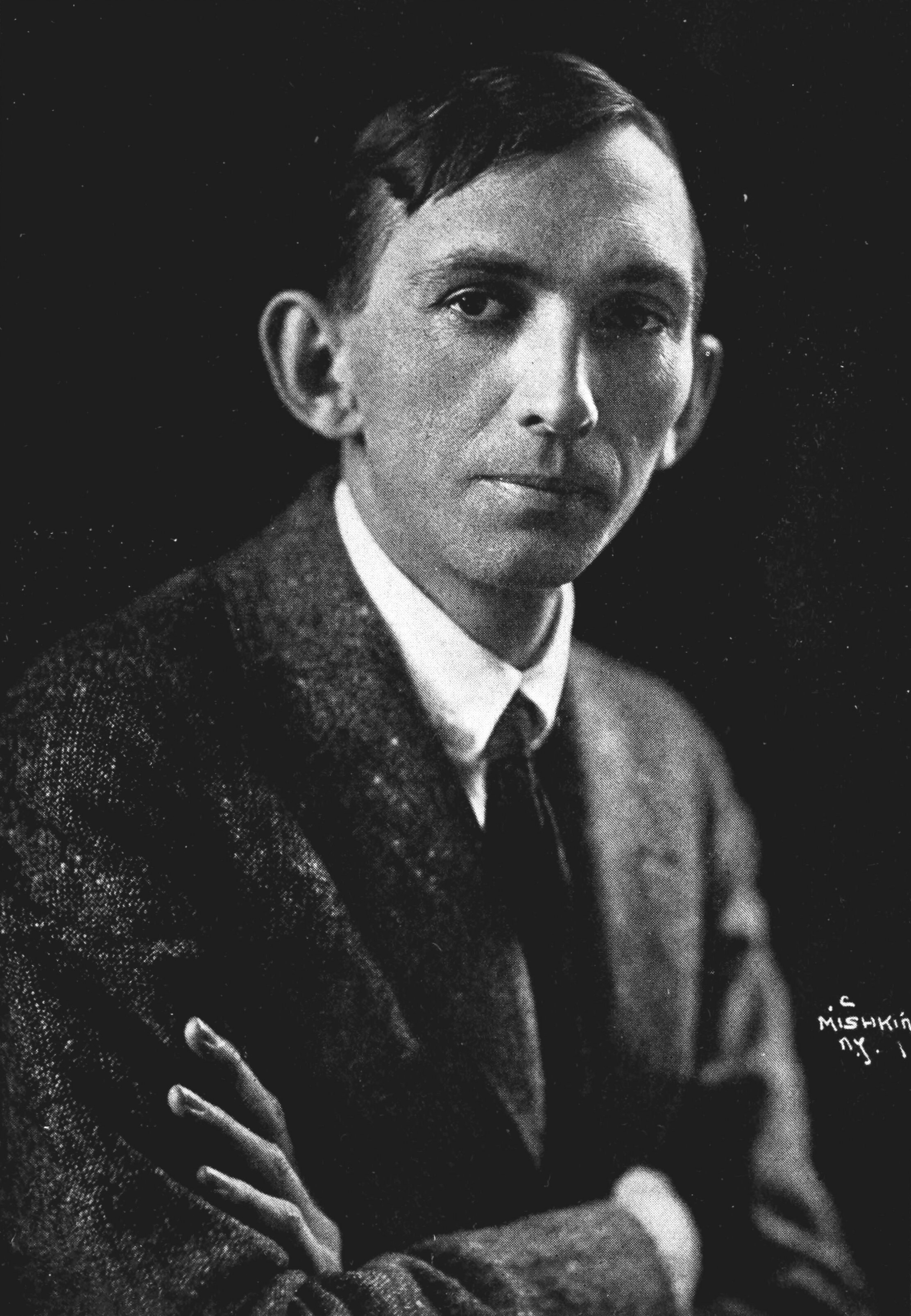
- Cadman in 1919
- Librettist: Nelle Richmond Eberhart
- Language: English
- Based on: "Rappaccini's Daughter" by Nathaniel Hawthorne (1844)
- Premiere: 20 March 1925; Carnegie Hall, New York City

The Garden of Mystery is an English-language American opera in one act and three scenes. The composer was Charles Wakefield Cadman with a libretto by Nelle Richmond Eberhart. The opera was based on Nathaniel Hawthorne's 1844 short story "Rappaccini's Daughter".

The work premiered in a concert version at Carnegie Hall in New York City on March 20, 1925, with the American National Orchestra conducted by Howard Barlow. A staged performance did not occur until 1996.

Hawthorne's Gothic story about a doctor whose work with poisons has made his daughter's touch deadly has inspired several operas, including The Poisoned Kiss, or The Empress and the Necromancer (Ralph Vaughan Williams, 1936); Rappaccini's Daughter (Margaret Garwood, 1980), and La hija de Rappaccini (Daniel Catán, 1991).

== Synopsis ==
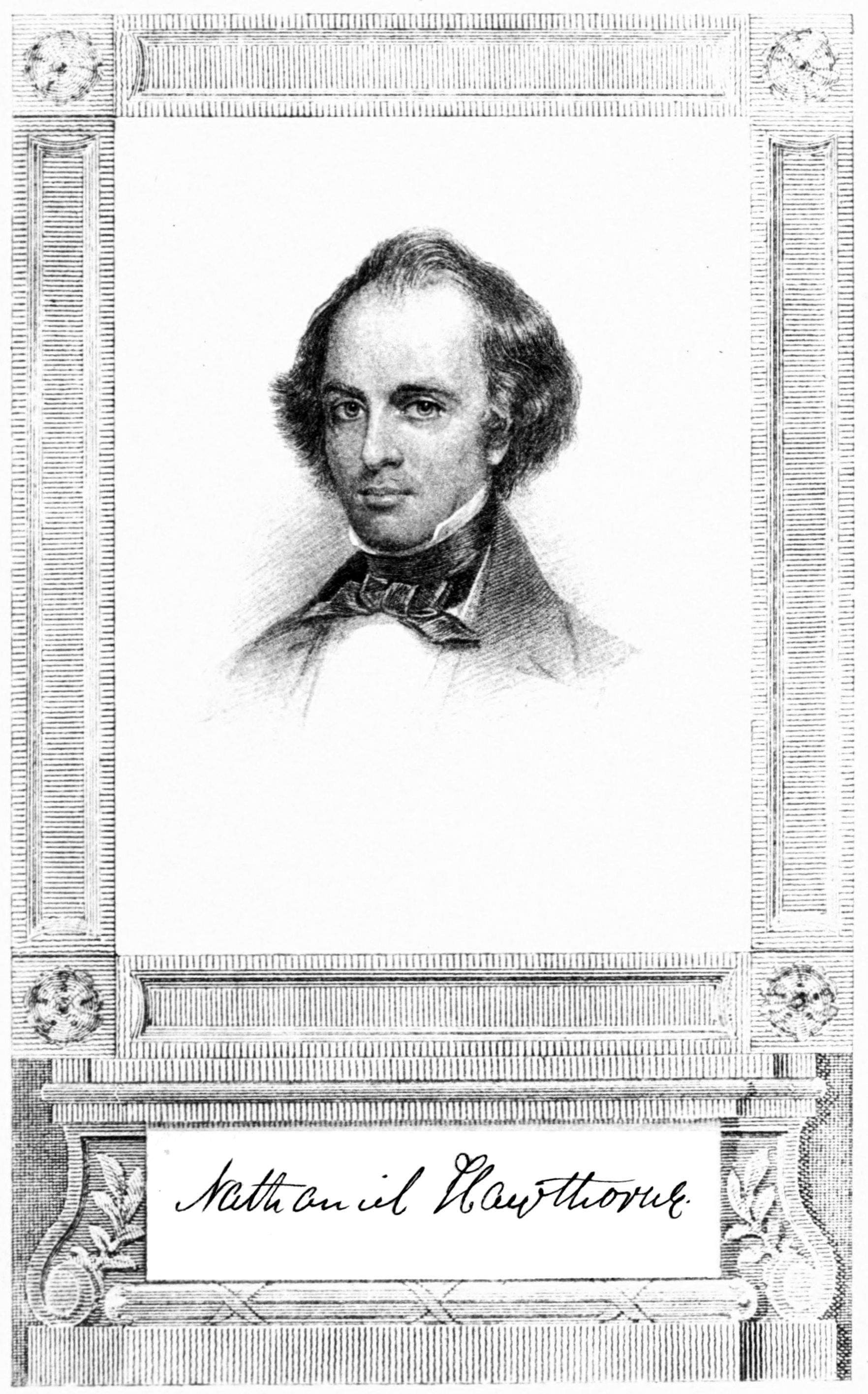
Nathaniel Hawthorne, author of the story adapted into the opera

The opera is set in 16th century Italy at Padua. The story takes place in the garden of Dr. Giacomo Rappaccini. Overlooking the garden is a neighboring home.

Rappaccini is an expert on botany and toxic plants. The plants in his garden are beautiful but deadly. He lives with his daughter, Beatrice. Beatrice's cousin Bianca is visiting. Bianca's love is Enrico.

Giovanni Guasconti is a university student who lives in a room that overlooks Rappacini's garden. He observes that the doctor seems to be afraid of plants in the garden but which Beatrice handles freely. He sees a bug drop dead from her breath. Giovanni is enchanted by this mysterious and beautiful woman.

Bianca and Enrico sit in the garden by the fountain and sing of their love and how they must flee the deadly garden.

Giovanni enters the garden and woos Beatrice. They start to embrace but she pulls back. Beatrice tells Giovanni that she has been raised on poisons and her kiss would be deadly. They both exit.

Giovanni retreats and visits a friend of his father's who gives him an antidote to Beatrice's poison. The next morning, Giovanni finds that he too is poisonous when his breath kills a spider. He goes to the garden with the antidote.

Beatrice, having lived her whole life on poison, believes she could not live without the toxins. She drinks the antidote and is proven correct. As she starts to die, she tells Giovanni to drink because the antidote will save him. She died in her father's arms. Giovanni drinks the antidote and lives.

== Composition and premiere ==
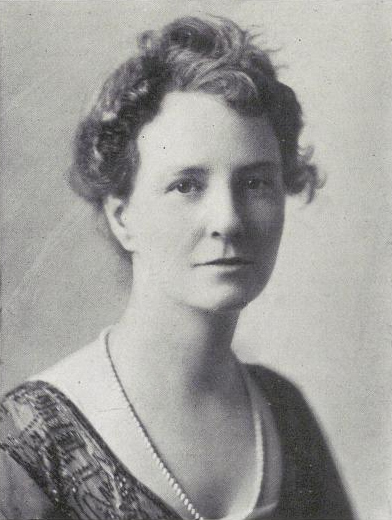
Nelle Richmond Eberhart, the librettist

Eberhart collaborated with Cadman on five operas. In May 1912, she suggested to Cadman basing an opera on the Hawthorne story and she began working that year. The original title was Beatrice, the name of Rappaccini's daughter, then The Garden of Death, before they settled on The Garden of Mystery. The first draft of the libretto was completed in October 1912 and the final version in 1914. Cadman finished the music in 1915. Grove's Dictionary noted the opera was still in manuscript form in 1919. The opera did not receive a performance until 1925 when it was given on March 20 in a concert version at Carnegie Hall given as a benefit performance for the Association of Music School Settlements of Greater New York. Howard Barlow conducted the American National Orchestra, a unit which Barlow himself organized; its musicians were all American-born and American-trained. Charles Trier directed. The score was published in 1925. Cadman's publisher was still advertising the score as late as 1951.

A 1927 study of American opera claimed Garden "was probably the second absolutely native American operatic performance. Hawthorne, the author of the original story; Eberhart, who transformed it into an opera libretto; and Cadman, the composer, all were born in America. The same was true of the cast, orchestra, conductor and stage personnel;" the first native opera being Cadman and Eberhart's 1918 opera Shanewis.

Charles Watt, publisher of Chicago's The Music News, was enthusiastic: "Here clearly was the Cadman flair, the Cadman effect, and the unique Cadman style. The flow of melody was almost continuous, the massing of tone was simple but striking and the injection of color was both appropriate and striking." Watt had praise for all the singers' performances, particularly Ernest Davis as Giovanni.

But the New York critics were harsh. Francis D. Perkins of The New York Herald Tribune said the opera was "a hardly feasible libretto set to undistinguished music". William James Henderson of The New York Sun said "it is impossible to describe in critical terms such a sorry attempt." Deems Taylor of The New York World said it was hard to judge the work itself from a performance that was "pretty bad". The New Yorker wrote "Mr. Cadman's work had not been in progress more than ten minutes before it became reasonably obvious that no history was being made. The psychological story is undramatic and Mr. Cadman's ear-filling but uneventful music does not compensate for the lack of interest in the fable." The same review observed "the fashionable audience departed early and often".

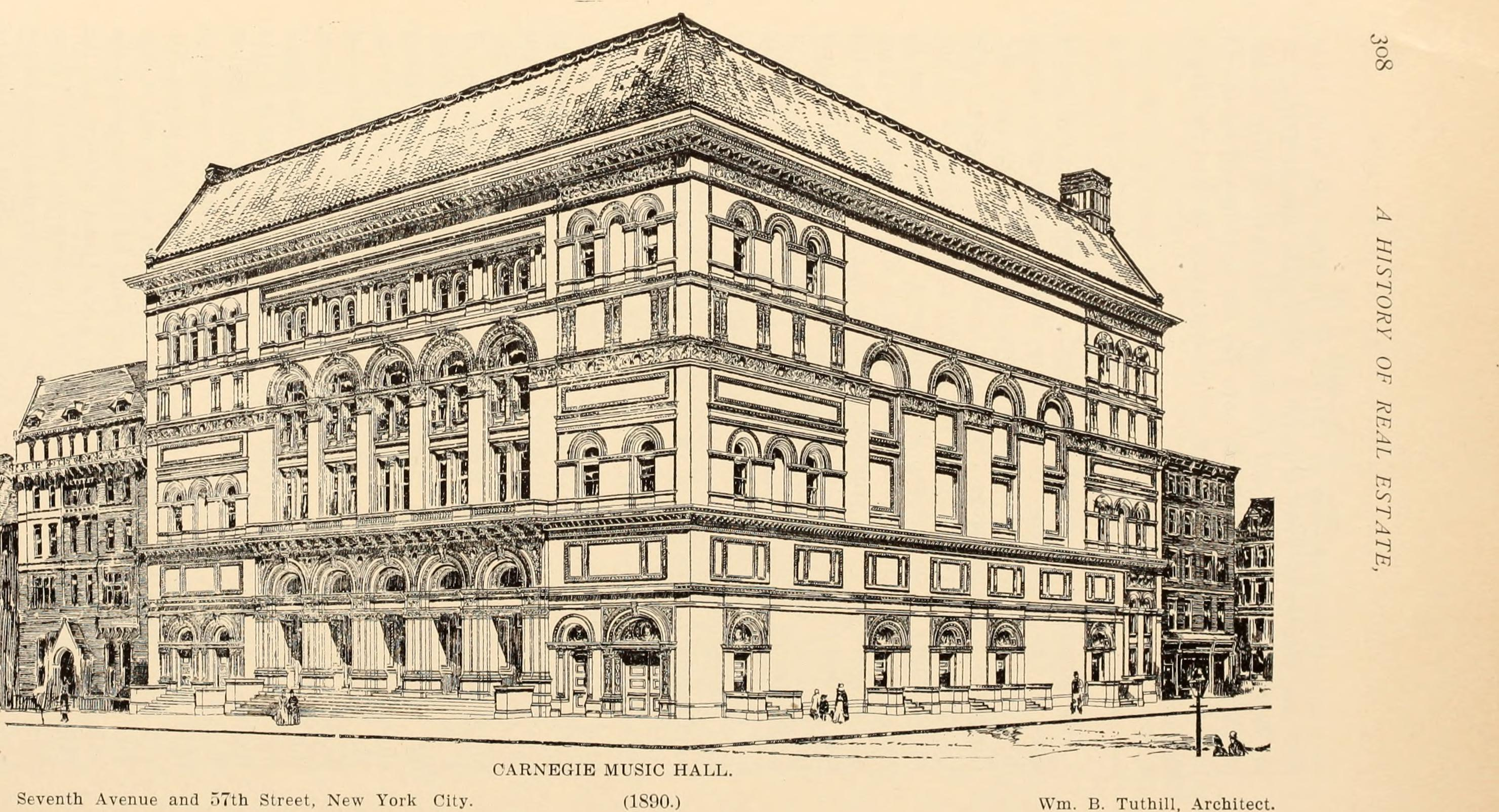
Carnegie Hall (1898)

The Pacific Coast Musician summarized the criticism of the 1925 premiere, writing it was "not satisfactorily produced ... the cast was inefficient, [and] the orchestra was unsatisfactory". The same review said Eberhart's libretto was done "with an eye to the literary quality rather than with an appreciation of dramatic values, a fatal thing to the success of opera, where action is necessary to hold the audience's interest". B. M. Steigman in the journal Music & Letters called it "pathetic" and "wretched", with a libretto "beyond hope".

Soon after the premiere, Cadman observed that the "brutal" notices of an amateur performance for charity led "to its lack of success ... not withstanding that it took twelve curtain calls".

Howard Perison said in 1982 that Garden was "a remarkable departure from Cadman's usual style, becoming at times chromatic and dissonant and employing unusual modal melodic patterns in an attempt to convey the sinister aspects of the story".

== Revivals ==
The second performance of the opera was over WOR-AM and the CBS Radio Network's Pioneer Hour at 8:30 p.m. Eastern Time on May 7, 1928. Howard Barlow, who conducted the premiere, also conducted the CBS performance. The cast was Frank Croxton as Dr. Rappaccini, Elizabeth Lennox as Beatrice, Charles W. Harrison as Giovanni, Elise Thiede as Bianca, and Vernon Archibald as Enrico. The NBC Red Network broadcast the opera later that year in a performance conducted by A. Walter Kramer. In 1931, the CBS Radio Network aired Garden as part of its series Grand Opera Miniatures. Howard Barlow again conducted, directing the Columbia Symphony Orchestra.

The American Chamber Opera Company gave the first staged performance of Garden on February 16, 1996. Garden was performed in New York City at the Kate Murphy Theatre at the Fashion Institute of Technology. Garden was given on a double bill with Lukas Foss's 1950 opera The Jumping Frog of Calaveras County. Anthony Tommasini of The New York Times was critical of both the work and the production. "The opera has a hokey, incomprehensible libretto about a maniacal doctor, a poisonous plant and two pairs of ill-fated lovers. The score is a hodgepodge that borrows shamelessly from Richard Strauss." Of the performers, Tommasini said "the orchestra, conducted by Douglas Anderson, floundered through this wayward music. Cadman's vocal parts are punishing, and the principals ... struggled through them with forced and edgy singing." The critic for Opera News was kinder, writing "Eberhart's libretto is needlessly obfuscatory: some members of the ACO cast were at a loss to explain what the story is about. The score is something else: its enchanting, graceful vocal lines and heavily perfumed orchestration (Cadman possessed an uncanny gift for getting maximum sound from minimum forces) recall the more intimate pages of Richard Strauss and especially Delius."

== Roles ==
Roles, voice types, premiere cast, 1928 broadcast, 1996 American Chamber Opera
Role	Voice type	Premiere cast, 1925 Conductor: Howard Barlow	CBS broadcast, 1928 Conductor: Howard Barlow	American Chamber Opera, 1996 Conductor:Howard Meltzer
Dr. Giacomo Rappaccini	bass	George Walker	Frank Croxton	Larry Piccard
Beatrice Rappaccini	contralto	Helen Cadmus	Elizabeth Lennox	Pamilia Phillips
Bianca	soprano	Yvonne de Tréville	Elise Thiede	Cynthia Madison
Giovanni Guasconti	tenor	Ernest Davis	Charles W. Harrison	Thomas L. Honnick
Enrico	baritone	Hubert Linscott	Vernon Archibald	
