= The Poisoned Kiss =

Opera by Vaughan Williams

- Opera by Ralph Vaughan Williams
- Vaughan Williams c. 1920
- Librettist: Evelyn Sharp
- Language: English
- Based on: Richard Garnett's The Poison Maid and Nathaniel Hawthorne's Rappaccini's Daughter
- Premiere: 12 June 1936; Cambridge Arts Theatre

The Poisoned Kiss, or The Empress and the Necromancer is an opera in three acts by the English composer Ralph Vaughan Williams. The libretto, by Evelyn Sharp, is based on Richard Garnett's The Poison Maid and Nathaniel Hawthorne's 1844 short story "Rappaccini's Daughter."

== Performance history ==
The opera was completed in 1929, first performed by the Intimate Opera Company at the Cambridge Arts Theatre, United Kingdom, on 12 May 1936 (conducted by Cyril Rootham), and premiered in the United States on 21 April 1937 by the Juilliard Opera Theatre at the Juilliard School's theatre on Claremont Avenue. The cast included Annamary Dickey as Angelica, Marvel Biddle as Tormentilla, Glenn Darwin as Gallanthus, Mary Frances Lehnerts as the Empress, David Otto as Dipsacus, Albert Gifford as Amaryllus, and Signe Gulbrandsen and Athena Pappas as the mediums.

In 1968 a broadcast on Radio 3 replaced Sharp's dialogue with a linking narration by Ursula Vaughan Williams; conducted by Maurice Handford, showing "a real feeling for the score, keeping everything shapely, giving the tunes their head and allowing the many delightful touches in the orchestral core to make their full effect", the cast was led by Patricia Clark, Ann Hood, Ronald Dowd and John Heddle Nash.

The Bronx Opera staged the work in January 2012.

== Roles ==
Roles, voice types, premiere cast
Role	Voice type	Premiere cast, 12 May 1936 Conductor: Cyril Rootham
Angelica	soprano	Margaret Field-Hyde
Tormentilla	soprano	Margaret Ritchie
Gallanthus	baritone	Geoffrey Dunn
Dipsacus	bass	Frederick Woodhouse
Empress Persicaria	contralto	Meriel St Clair
Amaryllus	tenor	Trefor Jones

== Recording ==
A complete recording was made by Chandos in Brangwyn Hall, Swansea in 2003, with Pamela Helen Stephen (Angelica), Roderick Williams (Gallanthus), John Graham-Hall (Hob), Richard Suart (Gob), Mark Richardson (Lob), Neal Davies (Dipsacus), James Gilchrist (Amaryllus), Janice Watson (Tormentilla), and Anne Collins (Empress Persicaria), with the Adrian Partington Singers and the BBC National Orchestra of Wales conducted by Richard Hickox.

The overture had been recorded by the Bournemouth Sinfonietta under George Hurst in 1975, and by the Northern Sinfonia under Hickox in 1983.

== See also ==
- The Garden of Mystery, 1925 opera by Charles Wakefield Cadman based on the same source material.
- Rappacini's Daughter, 1980 opera by Margaret Garwood based on the same source material.
- Rappacini's Daughter, 1991 opera by Daniel Catán based on the same source material.
- Rappaccini's Daughter, a list of other operas based on the same source material
