= Sean Bradley =

American conductor

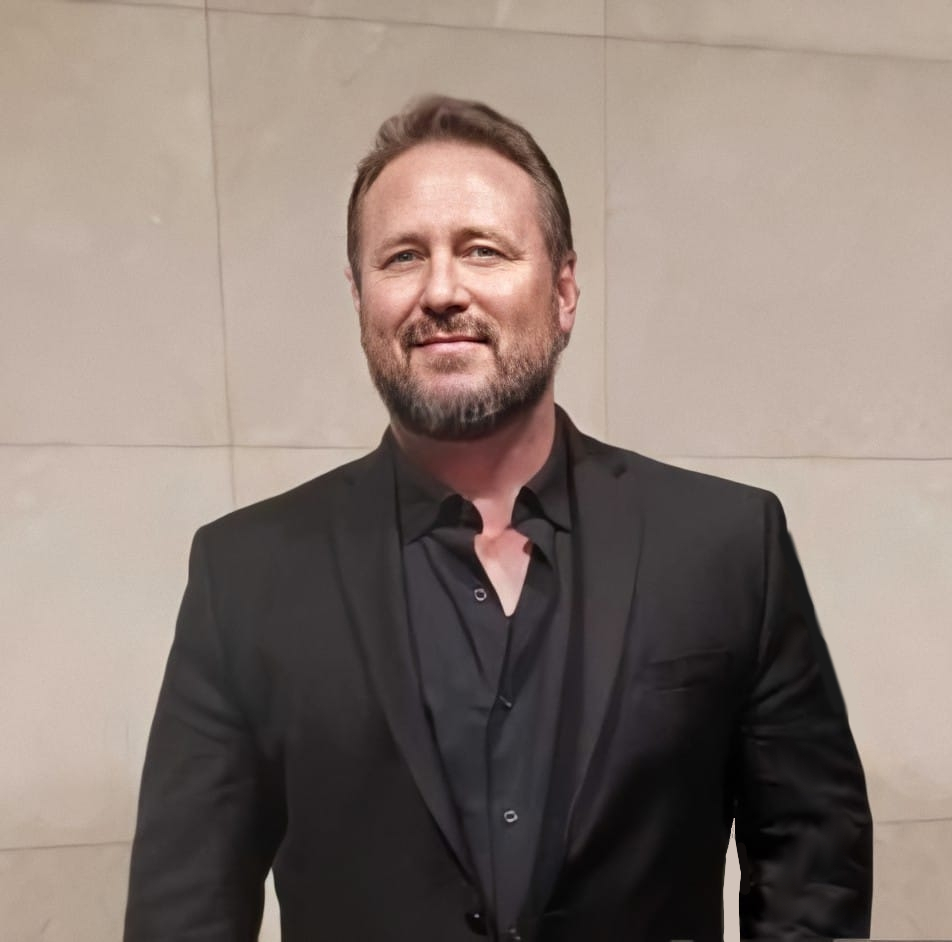
Sean Bradley (ca. 2019)

Sean Bradley (birthday unknown) is an American conductor, composer, violinist, music theorist, educator, impresario (producer of large-scale symphonic and operatic events), and technologist. Bradley is conductor of the Bradley String Orchestra, and president of Concert Talent—a production company which provides corporate entertainment, engagement marketing, talent management and logistical support for major label recording and touring artists. He is also the founder of BlogBlimp—a consulting firm providing custom web application development and cloud computing professional services. In recent years, his activities as an entrepreneur have increasingly included funding and leading a variety of music-related projects on the World Wide Web. He is a leading subject-matter expert on the topic of music and artificial intelligence, and was the founder of Bravoflix, the first online subscription video service in the U.S. dedicated exclusively to the performing arts. As a musician, he performs regularly on stages in the U.S., China, and Mexico.

== Music career ==
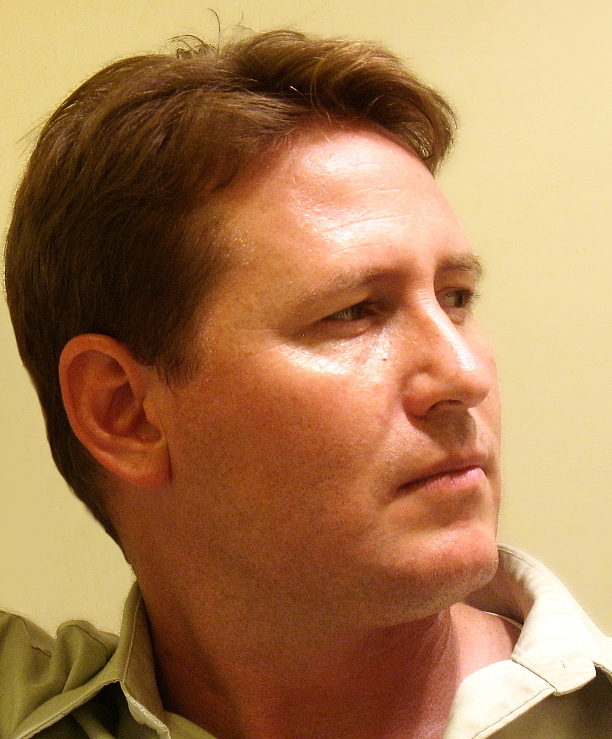
Sean Bradley (ca. 2004)

Bradley first gained a reputation as a conductor and active proponent of new music while serving as the artistic director of Opera Nova Santa Monica (Gail Gordon, founding executive director). His tenure at Opera Nova was closely associated with a group of five Spanish-speaking composers living and working in Los Angeles known as Los Cinco.

In 2004, Bradley started City Opera—a regional opera company based in Los Angeles. His first leadership initiative was the establishment of an extensive education and outreach program. Under his guidance, City Opera won a significant contract authorizing the company to deliver music education services to schools throughout the entire Los Angeles Unified School District, immediately placing the professional scope of the company's community engagement alongside other leading Los Angeles cultural institutions including Los Angeles Music Center, Los Angeles Philharmonic, and Los Angeles Opera. Bradley's unique vision for City Opera as a cooperative social enterprise enabled the company to earn year over year increases in unrestricted revenue and to operate uninterrupted without philanthropy.

In 2012, City Opera's production related activities were merged with Concert Talent—with the primary mission of serving major label touring artists, major corporate clients, and the unique needs of privately contracted talent in the global freelance music industry.

Concurrently in 2012, Bradley founded the Bradley String Orchestra—for which he serves as the conductor. The orchestra has gone on to perform in sold out stadiums across the southwestern United States, primarily in support of multi-Grammy winning Latin music legend, Marco Antonio Solis. The orchestra—composed of top Los Angeles talent—is noted for its superior musicality, spectacular stage presence, and engaging choreography. It is also one of the most culturally diverse ensembles in the U.S.

In recent years—2017 to the present—Bradley has been working with Bridge (musician) and IDK (rapper).

== Technology career ==
In the mid-1990s, while attending the Eastman School of Music, Bradley experimented with various technologies in the commercial analysis and automated creation of music using artificial intelligence. His early social experiments and statistical modeling of purchase habits among popular music consumers anticipated algorithmically driven preference engines later adopted by commercial streaming platforms.

In 2010, Bradley founded Bravoflix, an online video subscription service providing live streaming and on-demand performances of music, dance, and theater—the first platform of its kind in the United States dedicated exclusively to the performing arts. Three years later, he established BlogBlimp, a technology consultancy specializing in open-source, cloud-driven web applications. The firm's client portfolio has included major entities such as Fullscreen (company) and the Los Angeles Philharmonic.

In 2016, Bradley founded Wolfskill, a consultancy specializing in due diligence as a service for technology investors and founders, encompassing executive background checks and code reviews.

Bradley later expanded his focus into artificial intelligence through Victory Tech Partners. The firm operates Wolf You Feed, an initiative centered on an AI decision engine that utilizes a "model council" architecture for multi-model consensus evaluation. Through Victory Tech Partners, he also co-founded Varona.ai, a Nairobi, Kenya-based artificial intelligence company focusing on public healthcare solutions and local health infrastructure, serving as its Chief Technology Officer (CTO).

== Performances ==
In addition to his duties as a conductor and company director, Bradley's work as a principal and section violin player includes a busy schedule of activity among orchestras around the world. In 2007, 2011, and 2012, he toured the entire eastern coast of China with the Mantovani Orchestra. His choreographed ensemble—the Bradley String Orchestra—regularly accompanies musical superstar and Latin Grammy winner Marco Antonio Solís in sold-out stadium shows in the U.S. and in Mexico. As a soloist, he has premiered original music for the stage by Stephen Schwartz—the composer of the hit musical Wicked—with TheaterWorks in the San Francisco Bay area, and was the featured violinist in a West Coast premiere for Musical Theater West in Long Beach. He has served as concertmaster for several regional orchestras including the Antelope Valley Symphony Orchestra, Torrance Symphony, Opera a la Carte, Opera Nova, the Culver City Chamber Orchestra, the Disney-Grammy Collegiate Orchestra, the Eastman Opera and Studio Orchestras, and well as assistant concertmaster for the Orquesta de Baja California. He has served as principal second violin for the Golden State Pops Orchestra, Ventura Music Festival, Asian-American Philharmonic, Saint Matthews Chamber Orchestra, and El Paso Opera, and performed as a substitute first violin for West Bay Opera. He performs regularly with the symphonies and philharmonic orchestras of West L.A., Southeast L.A., Marina Del Rey, Brentwood, Burbank, Calabasas, Antelope Valley, San Bernardino, Redlands, and Riverside, and has performed with the Mozart Chamber Orchestra, Angeles Baroque Orchestra, the Henry Mancini Institute Orchestra, the dAKAH Hip Hop Orchestra, and others. In 2005, Bradley toured with the Orquesta de Baja California and world famous guitarist Angel Romero to New York City's Lincoln Center, and has visited nearly all of the contiguous United States in multiple tours with other leading orchestras. Bradley has played under the batons of such musical luminaries as Elmer Bernstein, Christoph von Dohnányi, Jerry Goldsmith, Quincy Jones, Michael Kamen, Lalo Schifrin, Gunther Schuller, Yuri Temirkanov, Michael Tilson Thomas, and John Williams, and has performed in concerts featuring Stevie Wonder, Tony Bennett, Diana Krall, Josh Groban, Marc Antony, Rita Coolidge, Arturo Sandoval, Christian McBride, Alex Acuña, Pinchas Zukerman, and other leading classical, pop, and jazz musicians. Bradley has performed in every major venue in Los Angeles from Disney Hall to the Cathedral of Our Lady of the Angels to The Playboy Mansion, and has made brief appearances playing the violin in the films Ray (with Jamie Foxx), Hannibal (with Anthony Hopkins), and Monster-in-Law (with Jennifer Lopez and Jane Fonda).

== Arts Education Advocacy ==
Bradley is a dedicated advocate for arts education, and works regularly and directly with students attending a wide variety of pre-professional, public, private, and charter schools, including inner-city schools. He served as a middle school band and orchestra teacher and as a continuation high school teacher for "at risk" students within the Glendale Unified School District. He is a former artist-faculty member of the Orange County High School of the Arts where he taught advanced placement (collegiate) music theory, a strings masterclass, and computer music notation. His work as Music Education Manager for The Da Camera Society at Mount St. Mary's College included coaching advanced chamber music ensembles at the Colburn School in the preparation and delivery of effective outreach presentations. More recently, in tandem with his work for Marco Antonio Solis, he leads a nationwide mentoring and outreach initiative for touring musicians, preparing them to excite stadium size audiences, while connecting them with schools local to each city on tour. He was a founding member of the steering committee for the Los Angeles Arts Consortium which evolved out of LA Unified School District's Arts Community Partnership Network prior to its disbandment in 2008. Bradley also served as a board member of the Daniel Catán Foundation and authored a brief official biography for the composer.

== Conservatory and Military Training ==
Bradley is a graduate of the Eastman School of Music where—in addition to music theory and computer programming—he studied violin with Ilya Kaler, and composition with Christopher Rouse and Allan Schindler. He studied conducting with John Farrer and briefly with Jorge Mester. Other teachers included Aurelio de la Vega and Abram Shtern. He spent several years living in the studio of famed Dutch painter, Jan H. Hoowij, mentored there by the artist's widow, Pem Hoowij—a protégé of Émile Jaques-Dalcroze.

Bradley is a former Special Operations paratrooper with the US Army Rangers and member of the 3rd US Infantry Regiment (The Old Guard)—Presidential Escort unit. He served in Kuwait and Iraq in 1994 during Operation Vigilant Warrior, and hails from three generations of decorated warfighters.

== See also ==
Los Cinco
