= Rappaccini's Daughter =

1844 short story by Nathaniel Hawthorne

- Short story by Nathaniel Hawthorne
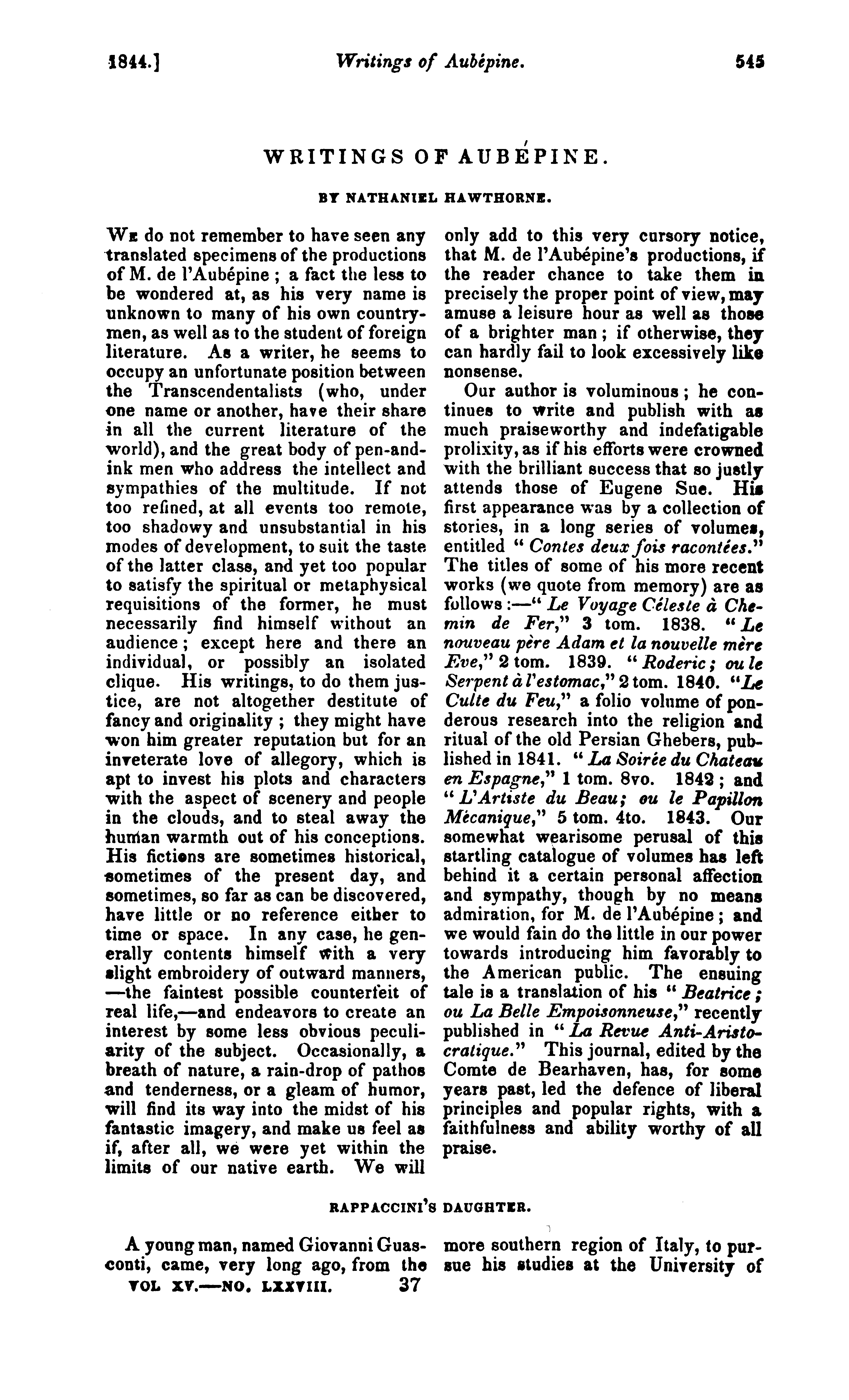
- Country: United States
- Language: English
- Genres: Short story, Gothic science fiction

Publication
- Published in: The United States Magazine and Democratic Review in 1844. Reprinted in Mosses from an Old Manse in 1846
- Publication type: Anthology
- Media type: Print (Hardback & Paperback)
- Publication date: December 1844

"Rappaccini's Daughter" is a Gothic short story by Nathaniel Hawthorne first published in the December 1844 issue of The United States Magazine and Democratic Review in New York, and later in various collections. It is about Giacomo Rappaccini, a medical researcher in Padua who grows a garden of poisonous plants. He brings up his daughter to tend the plants, and she becomes resistant to the poisons, but in the process she herself becomes poisonous to others. The traditional story of a poisonous maiden has been traced back to India, and Hawthorne's version has been adopted in contemporary works.

== Plot summary ==
The story is set in Padua, Italy, in a distant and unspecified past, possibly in the sixteenth century, after the Paduan Botanical Garden had been founded.

Giovanni Guasconti, a young student recently arrived from Naples, Southern Italy, to study at the University of Padua, is renting a room in an ancient building that still exhibits the Coat of Arms of the once-great, long since extinct Scrovegni family. Giovanni has studied Dante Alighieri's Divine Comedy and remembers that an ancestor of the Scrovegni, Reginaldo degli Scrovegni, appears in Dante's Hell, as a usurer and a sinner against Nature and Art (Canto XVII:64-75).

From his quarters, Giovanni looks at Beatrice, the beautiful daughter of Dr. Giacomo Rappaccini, a botanist who works in isolation. Beatrice is confined to the lush and locked gardens, which are filled with exotic poisonous plants grown by her father.

Having fallen in love, Giovanni enters the garden and secretly meets with Beatrice a number of times, while ignoring his mentor, Professor Pietro Baglioni. Professor Baglioni is a rival of Dr. Rappaccini and he warns Giovanni that Rappaccini is devious and that he and his work should be avoided.

Giovanni notices Beatrice's strangely intimate relationship with the plants as well as the withering of fresh regular flowers and the death of an insect when exposed to her skin or breath. On one occasion, Beatrice embraces a plant in a way that she seems part of the plant itself; then she talks to the plant, "Give me thy breath, my sister, for I am faint with common air."

Giovanni eventually realizes that Beatrice, having been raised in the presence of poison, has developed an immunity and has become poisonous herself. A gentle touch of her hand leaves a purple print on his wrist. Beatrice urges Giovanni to look past her poisonous exterior and see her pure and innocent essence, creating great feelings of doubt and confusion in Giovanni.

In the end, Giovanni becomes poisonous himself: insects die when they come into contact with his breath. Giovanni is troubled by this, which he sees as a curse, and he blames Beatrice.

Professor Baglioni gives him an antidote to cure Beatrice and free her from her father's cruel experiment. However, when Beatrice drinks the antidote, she becomes sick and dies.

Before realizing that Beatrice is dying, Dr. Rappaccini excitedly welcomes the love between his two creatures, his daughter and her suitor, Giovanni, who has been transformed so that he can now be a true and worthy companion to Beatrice.

While Beatrice is dying, Professor Baglioni looks down from a window into the garden and triumphantly shouts "Rappaccini! Rappaccini! and is THIS the upshot of your experiment!"

== Interpretations ==
English professor Sheldon W. Liebman has drawn parallels between the story and John Milton's 1667 Paradise Lost, with Dr. Rappaccini representing the role of God (or more accurately a man playing God), Beatrice and Giovanni respectively representing Adam and Eve (with reversed gender roles) and Professor Baglioni representing Satan (a fallen angel in Milton's telling). For example, he notes that Giovanni/Eve offers Beatrice/Adam the antidote, suggesting that both should drink of it, but only Beatrice/Adam does so. Liebman writes, "In brief summary, the characters fall into place according to Milton's scheme in Paradise Lost, except that in Hawthorne's version the myth is inverted, for he is portraying the second Fall, the fall from the promised paradise rather than from paradise itself.

According to one possible interpretation, the moral of the story is that mortals should not attempt to play God: Beatrice dies for the sins of her father, Dr. Rappaccini, whose experiments aimed at interfering with the laws of Nature. According to an opposite interpretation, Giovanni is not able to accept the gift that Beatrice brings, and her uniqueness: in the attempt to make her normal, he loses her and her love.

The name of Rappaccini's daughter is a reference to Dante's Beatrice, allegory of Divine Wisdom and Divine Grace: the name means "she who brings bliss", "she who makes blessed". Dante meets her in the Garden of Eden, while a hundred angels scatter flowers above and around her (Purgatory Canto XXX:19–39).

According to Octavio Paz, the sources of Hawthorne's story lie in Ancient India. In the play Mudrarakshasa, one of two political rivals employs the gift of a visha kanya, a beautiful girl who is fed on poison. This theme of a woman transformed into a phial of venom is popular in Indian literature and appears in the Puranas. From India, the story passed to the West and contributed to the Gesta Romanorum, among other texts. In the 17th century, Robert Burton picked up the tale in The Anatomy of Melancholy and gave it a historical character: the Indian king Porus sends Alexander the Great a girl brimming with poison.

In Hawthorne's story, the character Pietro Baglioni draws a parallel between Beatrice's fate and an old story of a poisonous Indian girl presented to Alexander, a tale that appears to be based on the Burton/Browne story. Also, the University of Padua founded in 1545, is famed for its vast botanical garden; but whether the garden actually influenced Hawthorne in writing "Rappaccini's Daughter" is not known.

It is also possible that Hawthorne was inspired by the character Elizabeth's grotesque revenge in the 1833 novel The Down-Easters by fellow New Englander John Neal. The two authors first connected when Neal's magazine The Yankee published the first substantial praise of Hawthorne's work in 1828.

== Style ==
Hawthorne begins the story with reference to the writings of the fictional writer 'Monsieur Aubépine', named after the French name of the hawthorn plant. He both praises and criticizes the author's style and intent. This introduction aims to establish a tone of uncertainty and confusion, throwing off expectations and establishing the theme of the interrelationship of perception, reality and fantasy. He lists texts by M. de l'Aubépine, some of which translate into Hawthorne's own works as follows:

- Contes deux fois racontés is Twice-Told Tales.
- Le Voyage céleste à chemin de fer is "The Celestial Railroad".
- Le Nouveau Père Adam et la Nouvelle Mère Eve is "The New Adam and Eve".
- Rodéric ou le Serpent à l'estomac is "Egotism; or, The Bosom-Serpent".
- Le Culte de feu is Fire Worship.
- "L'Artiste du beau" is "The Artist of the Beautiful".

The narrator says the text was translated from Beatrice ou la Belle Empoisonneuse which translates to "Beatrice or the Beautiful Poisoner" and was published in "La Revue Anti-Aristocratique" ("The Anti-Aristocratic Review").

== Adaptations ==
=== Operas ===
- The Garden of Mystery by Charles Wakefield Cadman (1925).
- The Poisoned Kiss by Ralph Vaughan Williams (1936).
- Rappaccini's Daughter by Avrohom Leichtling (1967–68).
- Rappacini's Daughter by Margaret Garwood (1980)
- Rappaccini's Daughter by Dennis Riley (1984).
- Rappaccini's Daughter by Sam Dennison (1984).
- La hija de Rappaccini by Daniel Catán (1991).
- Rappaccini's Daughter by Ellen Bender (1992).
- Rappaccini's Daughter by Michael Cohen (2000).

=== Plays ===
- Spanish-language play: La Hija de Rappaccini by Octavio Paz (1956)
- English-language play: Rappaccini's Daughter by Sebastian Doggart (1996)

=== Poetry ===
- John Todhunter verse-play The Poison-Flower, A Phantasy, in Three Scenes (1891)

=== Radio ===
- NBC's The Weird Circle (1943–1947), Episode 52, Radio Play. Broadcast date: November 26, 1944
- CBC's Vanishing Point (1984–1986), third episode of the "Thrice Told Tales" sub-series. Broadcast date: December 1, 1986

=== Television ===
- Lights Out, featuring the first screen appearance of Eli Wallach (1951)
- PBS's The American Short Story, starring Kristoffer Tabori, Kathleen Beller, Madeline Willemsen and Leonardo Cimino (1980)

=== Film ===
- Twice Told Tales, starring Vincent Price (1963)
- Rappaccini, starring Perry King (1966)

=== Literature ===
- The Strange Case of the Alchemist's Daughter (2017) by Theodora Goss
- This Vicious Hunger by Francesca May (2025)
- Her Wicked Roots by Tanya Pell (2025)

== General and cited references ==
- Doggart, Sebastian (1996). "Rappaccini's Daughter, by Octavio Paz". Latin American Plays: New Drama from Argentina, Cuba, Mexico and Peru. London: Nick Hern Books in association with Visiting Arts. ISBN 978-1854592491. OCLC 283700090.
