= Rappaccini's Daughter (Catán opera) =

Opera by Daniel Catán, libretto by Juan Tovar

Rappaccini’s Daughter
- Opera by Daniel Catán
- Librettist: Juan Tovar
- Language: Spanish
- Based on: La hija de Rappaccini (Play) by Octavio Paz & Rappaccini's Daughter by Nathaniel Hawthorne
- Premiere: 25 April 1991; Palacio de Bellas Artes, Mexico City, Mexico

La hija de Rappaccini (Rappaccini's Daughter) is an opera in two acts composed by Daniel Catán to a libretto by Juan Tovar based on the play by Octavio Paz and the 1844 short story by Nathaniel Hawthorne. It premiered at the Palacio de Bellas Artes in Mexico City in 1991 and had its US premiere in 1994 at San Diego Opera. Upon its premiere in San Diego, Rappaccini's Daughter became the first work by a Mexican composer to be produced by a major opera house in the United States. Although Catán's second opera, Rappaccini's Daughter was his first commercial success.

The success of Rappaccini's Daughter brought Catán international attention, launching his musical career in the United States and sealing the commission of his next opera, Florencia en el Amazonas by the Houston Grand Opera.

== Roles ==
Role	Voice type	Premiere cast, 25 April 1994 (Conductor: Eduardo Diazmuñoz)
Beatriz	mezzo-soprano	Encarnación Vázquez
Dr. Baglioni	tenor	Ignacio Clapes
Dr. Rappaccini	baritone	Jesús Suaste
Isabela	soprano	Inmaculada Egido
Giovanni	tenor	Alfonso Orozco

== Synopsis ==
=== Act 1 ===
Scene 1
On the streets of Padua, Italy, Dr. Baglioni argues with Dr. Rappaccini over his research and methods. Baglioni believes Rappaccini's practices should be stopped. Rappaccini defends his work and dismisses Baglioni's criticism. The two men depart.

Scene 2
Giovanni, a young medical student, arrives from Naples. While on the street, Isabela approaches, asking him if he is the student that will be renting her spare room. Giovanni confirms and Isabela shows him to his room.

Scene 3
Once in Giovanni's room, Isabela tells the student that from his terrace he can see the garden of Dr. Rappaccini. She then explains that the doctor has a beautiful daughter named Beatriz and that he won't let anyone near her. Soon Dr. Baglioni arrives and warns Giovanni of Rappaccini's questionable practices.

Beatriz's Aria from Act 1, Scene 4
Beatriz's Aria, sung in the garden of Dr. Rappaccini

Scene 4
In his garden, Dr. Rappaccini sings of the healing and poisonous nature of his plants. Beatriz enters and Rappaccini shares his vision with her, then leaves. Once alone, Beatriz laments her solitary life. She picks a rose and it withers in her hands.

Scene 5
Giovanni watches the rose wither in Beatriz's hands from his window. In disbelief, he questions what he saw. He expresses his infatuation for Beatriz then goes to sleep.

Scene 6
In his dream, Giovanni enters Dr. Rappaccini's garden. Hearing voices of the flowers, he finds the doctor who tells him that ‘the gardener never sleeps’. Rappaccini wanders away. Giovanni sings of his desire for Beatriz.

=== Act 2 ===
Scene 1

Time has passed and Dr. Baglioni runs into Giovanni on the street. Giovanni has little interest in talking and Baglioni realizes the young man is pale and looks ill. Baglioni questions if Giovanni is being used in one of Dr. Rappaccini's experiments. Giovanni becomes defensive and denies being involved with the doctor.

Scene 2

Giovanni is in his room. Isabela rushes to him and reveals that there is a secret entrance to Dr. Rappaccini's garden. The two leave towards the entrance.

Love Duet from Act 2, Scene 3
Giovanni meets Beatriz in the garden

Scene 3

Giovanni enters the garden alone and finds Beatriz, who is startled. She reveals that she had been waiting for him. Sharing their emotions in duet, Giovanni goes to touch a tree in the garden. Beatrice stops him, telling him that the tree is dangerous. She touches his hand in the process. Dr. Rappaccini arrives and Beatriz runs away. The doctor tells Giovanni that he wishes to be friends. Giovanni departs.

Scene 4

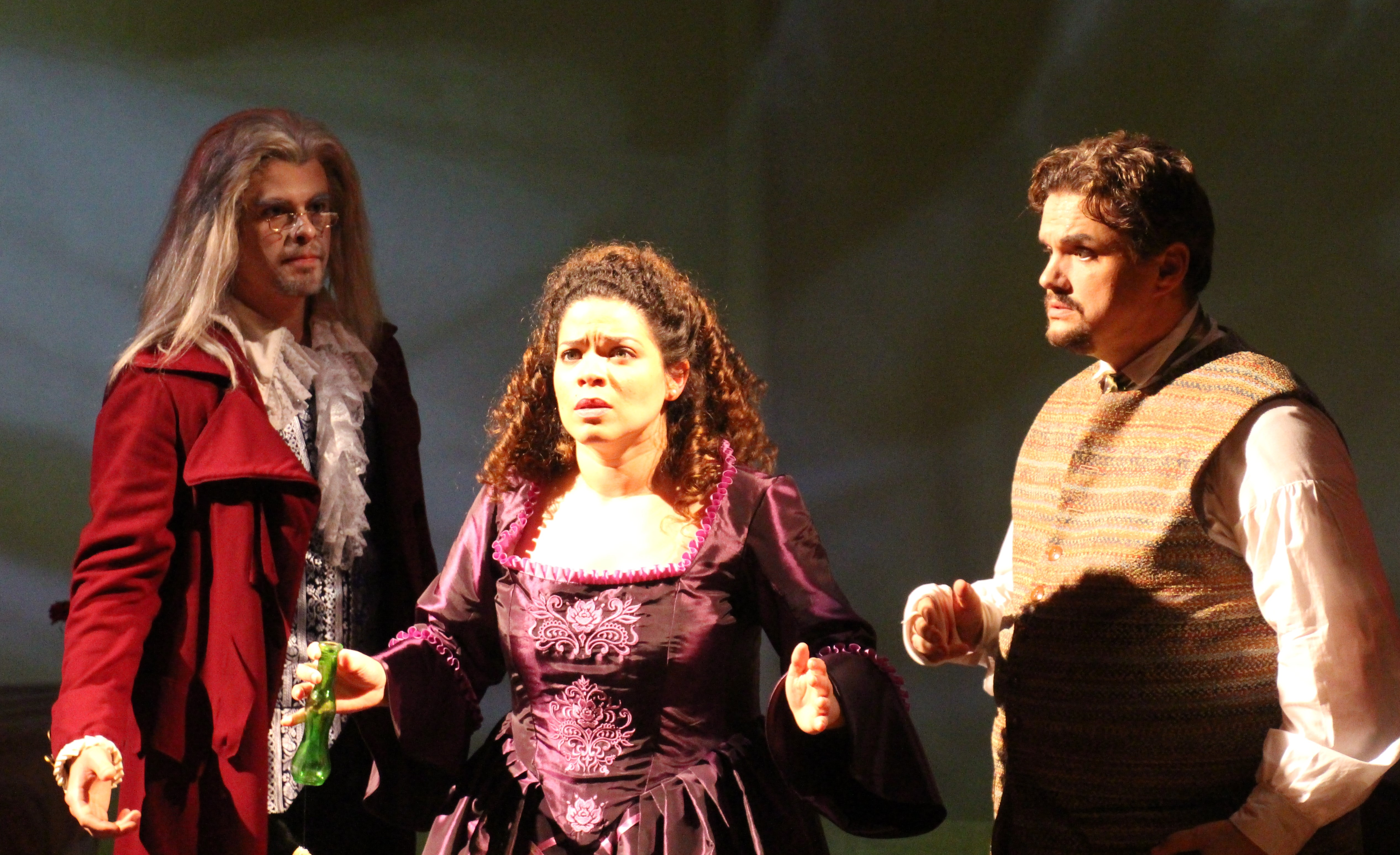
Dr. Rappaccini, Beatriz and Giovanni after Beatriz drinks the antidote

Giovanni is back his in room nursing the hand that was touched by Beatriz. Dr. Baglioni arrives and tells a story of a beautiful woman who turned out to be a deadly trap. He then accuses Beatriz of administering deadly potions and being a danger. Giovanni becomes agitated. Baglioni states that there is still time to free Beatriz from her father and return her to a normal life. He gives a vial of antidote to Giovanni who agrees to give it to Beatriz.

Scene 5

Giovanni returns to the garden, aware that he has been poisoned. First upset with Beatriz, he then tells her that all is not lost and that they can take the antidote. Dr. Rappaccini rushes in and tells them that his scientific work has cured them and they may safely leave the garden. He adds that taking any antidote will result in death. Beatriz takes the antidote from Giovanni and against the will of both men, drinks it and dies.

== Recordings ==
- 2011: Manhattan School of Music, Newport Classic. Conductor Eduardo Diazmuñoz. NPD85623/2
- 2002: Mexico City Philharmonic Orchestra, Naxos Records. Excerpts. Conductor Eduardo Diazmuñoz. 8.557034.

== See also ==
- The Garden of Mystery, 1925 opera by Charles Wakefield Cadman based on the same source material.
- Rappacini's Daughter, 1980 opera by Margaret Garwood based on the same source material.
- The Poisoned Kiss, 1936 opera by Ralph Vaughan Williams based on the same source material.
