= Rappaccini's Daughter (Garwood opera) =

1980 American opera in two acts by Margaret Garwood

- Opera by Margaret Garwood
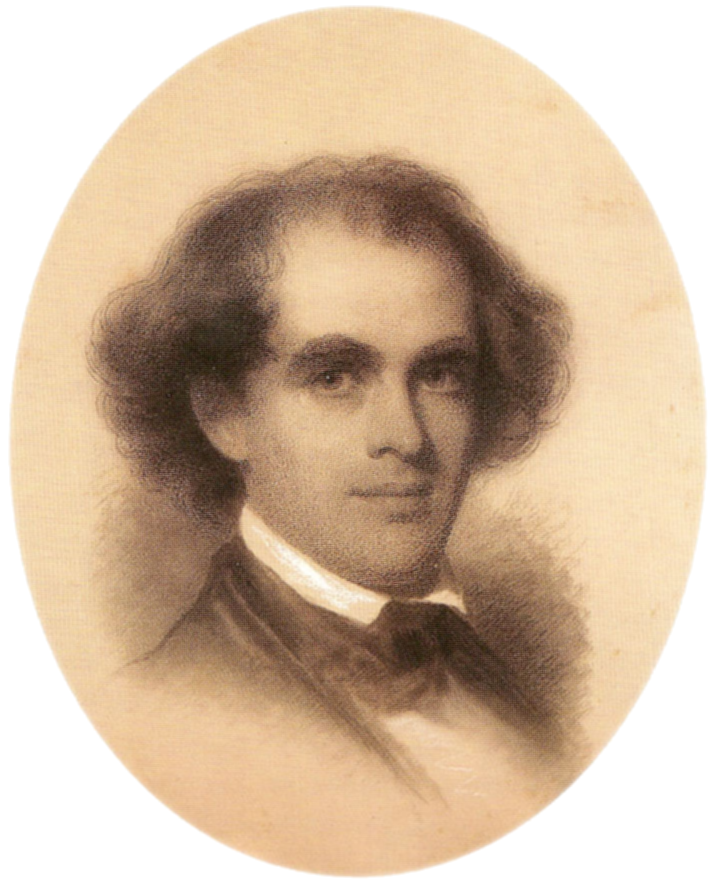
- Nathaniel Hawthorne in 1846
- Librettist: Margaret Garwood
- Language: English
- Based on: "Rappaccini's Daughter" by Nathaniel Hawthorne (1844)
- Premiere: 19 November 1980; Philadelphia, Pennsylvania

Rappaccini's Daughter is an English-language American opera in two acts and six scenes first presented in 1980. (Note: Griffel states it is three acts but the contemporaneous review in Opera and the cited source both say it is two acts.) The composer and librettist was Margaret Garwood, who based it on Nathaniel Hawthorne's 1844 short story of the same name.

The Pennsylvania Opera Theater gave the world premiere in a concert version at the Philadelphia College of the Performing Arts's Theatre 313 (Note: This was located at 313 South Broad Street, Philadelphia.) on November 19, 1980. (Note: Griffel says the premiere was on November 23, but both Hamilton's detailed chronology of Philadelphia opera and a 1981 article in Opera say the premiere was November 19.) The same company presented the first staged version at Philadelphia's Trocadero Theatre on May 6, 1983. Both versions received favorable reviews.

Hawthorne's Gothic story about a doctor whose work with poisons has made his daughter's touch deadly has inspired several operas including The Garden of Mystery (Charles Wakefield Cadman, 1925); The Poisoned Kiss, or The Empress and the Necromancer (Ralph Vaughan Williams, 1936); and La hija de Rappaccini (Daniel Catán, 1991).

== Synopsis ==
The opera is set in Padua at the turn of the 19th Century. Giovanni, new to Padua, rents a room from Lisabetta. Giovanni is warned by his friend Baglioni to avoid Beata, (Note: In Hawthorne's story, the character is named Beatrice.) the daughter of Dr. Rappacini. Rappacini and his daughter live next to Lisabetta's property. Rappaccini, a scientist, has been experimenting with poisonous plants and his daughter. The landlady, Lisabetta, is comic relief to the story. Giovanni pursues Beata despite his friend's warning and falls in love. He falls ill. Baglioni gives Giovanni a potion to cure himself and Beata. Beata takes the cure, knowing it will kill her. She dies as her father returns.

== Composition and premiere ==
Margaret Garwood (1927–2015) published an article on difficulties she encountered in composing the opera. "One such problem was how to retain the color of Hawthorne's language without making it sound stilted. Consequently, words such as 'whence', 'thou', 'would'st', and so forth, though beautiful when spoken, could tend to sound archaic when sung." Garwood also observed "the problem of how to bring out certain twentieth-century psychological insights implicit in the story without ruining the particular nineteenth-century flavor of the work. The solution, I think, lies in a deep concern for the dramatic and musical integration of the text."

Rappaccini's Daughter was commissioned by the Pennsylvania Opera Theater as the first world premiere presented by the company. Barbara Silverstein, artistic director of the company, found Garwood's music to be "passionately lyrical, melodic, and accessible." The opera was initially presented in 1980 at Philadelphia's Theater 313 with only a piano accompaniment played by Judith Large. In lieu of sets, the production economized by using dancers to evoke the plants of Dr. Rappaccini's garden. Kay Walker directed Cary Michaels as Giovanni, Heather McCormick as Beata, James Butler as Dr. Rappaccini, Harriet Harris as Lisabetta the landlady, and Gregory Powell as Professor Baglione. After the premiere on November 19, two more performances followed on November 21 and 23. In the concert version, Garwood's work was praised in Opera, Max De Schauensee writing of "fluently melodic" music in a "colorful evening" with "fresh voices."

Only after funding was secured did the Pennsylvania Opera Theater commission Garwood to compose the orchestration. Grants came from the National Opera Institute and the National Endowment for the Arts. Silverstein, who conducted both the concert and stage versions, described the form of the opera in the completed form: "through-composed with arias, duets, and a trio. There is no chorus, and the orchestration is strings, pairs of winds (including some interesting color instruments such as a contrabassoon and bass clarinet), percussion, and harp." The staged version was presented in 1983 at the Trocadero Theatre in Philadelphia to a sold-out run.

William Ashbrook in Opera gave a mixed review, praising Garwood's "gift for . . . atmospheric orchestration and . . . lyrical vocal lines," but overall calling it "an opera of authentic promise rather than assured fulfillment." Ashbrook faulted Garwood for not cutting through more of Hawthorne's "tangled allegory with its cumbersome symbolism and ornate 19th century diction," while praising the singers and the production design. The review in The New York Times was more favorable, observing "the composer has captured the lure of the garden in her music and tamed the dangers of the subject with an intelligently made libretto." Garwood wrote a "conservative, lyrical score [which] approached its themes in the style of both Debussy and Berg." The Times also praised the conducting, the singing, and the production itself.

There were five performances beginning on May 6; the others were May 8, 10, 13, and 15. Maggie L. Harrer directed and choreographed with sets and lighting by Quentin Thomas, and costumes by Laura Drawbaugh. The cast was Michael Ballam as Giovanni, Jean Bradel as Beata, Ralph Bassett as Dr. Rappaccini, Jeanne Haughn as Lisabetta, and Barry Ellison as Professor Baglione.

The vocal score was published in 2017. Garwood adapted another Hawthorne work, The Scarlet Letter, into an opera; it debuted in 2010.

== Roles ==
Roles, voice types, 1980 concert premiere, 1983 stage premiere
Role	Voice type	Theatre 313, 1980 Conductor: Barbara Silverstein	Trocadero Theatre, 1983 Conductor: Barbara Silverstein
Dr. Rappaccini	bass-baritone	James Butler	Ralph Bassett
Beata Rappacini	soprano	Heather McCormick	Jean Bradel
Giovanni Guasconti	tenor	Michael Ballam	Michael Ballam
Lisabetta	mezzo-soprano	Harriet Harris	Jeanne Haughan
Professor Baglioni	baritone	Gregory Powell	Barry Ellison
Sister Plant (off-stage)	mezzo-soprano	Dorothy Ann Cardella	Jeanne Haughan

== See also ==
- The Garden of Mystery, 1925 opera by Charles Wakefield Cadman based on the same source material.
- The Poisoned Kiss, or The Empress and the Necromancer, 1936 opera by Ralph Vaughan Williams based on the same source material.
- La hija de Rappaccini, 1991 opera by Daniel Catán.
- Rappaccini's Daughter, a list of other operas based on the same source material.
