= John Gilmore (tenor) =

American opera singer (1950–1994)

John Gilmore (1950 – December 7, 1994) was an American operatic tenor. His voice is preserved on several recordings made for the Metropolitan Opera radio broadcasts and on the television program Live from the Metropolitan Opera.

== Life and career ==
Born in Bradford, Pennsylvania, Gilmore studied opera at the Jacobs School of Music at Indiana University where he earned both a Bachelor of Music and a Master of Music degrees. In 1980 he won the regional finals of the Metropolitan Opera National Council Auditions. That same year he was a featured soloist in Arthur Honegger's Jeanne d'Arc au bûcher with Irene Papas and The Little Orchestra Society at Avery Fisher Hall. In 1982 he portrayed the title role in the United States premiere of Haydn's Orlando paladino with the Pennsylvania Opera Theater, and appeared as the Shepherd in Oedipus rex with the Boston Symphony Orchestra under Seiji Ozawa at the Tanglewood Music Festival.

In 1981 Gilmore made his debut at the Metropolitan Opera as Hunchback in Strauss' Die Frau ohne Schatten with Birgit Nilsson as The Dyer's Wife, Éva Marton as the Empress, and Gerd Brenneis as the Emperor. He appeared in nearly 190 more performances at the Met over the next eleven years, portraying such roles as Andres in Wozzeck, Archer in Francesca da Rimini, Count Elemer in Arabella, the Count of Lerma in Don Carlo, Eisslinger in Die Meistersinger von Nürnberg, Malcolm in Macbeth, the Messenger in Aida, Normanno in Lucia di Lammermoor, Prince Shuisky in Boris Godunov, Ruiz in Il trovatore, Scaramuccio in Ariadne auf Naxos, the Shepherd in Oedipus rex, and the Steersman in The Flying Dutchman among others. His last appearance at the Met was on January 10, 1992, as the Man with Lather in The Ghosts of Versailles.

In 1987 Gilmore toured South Korea in performances with the Seoul Philharmonic Orchestra and was a soloist with the Wilmington Symphony Orchestra. He taught on the voice faculty at the University of North Carolina Wilmington.
