= Gertrude Ross =

American composer and pianist (1889–1957)

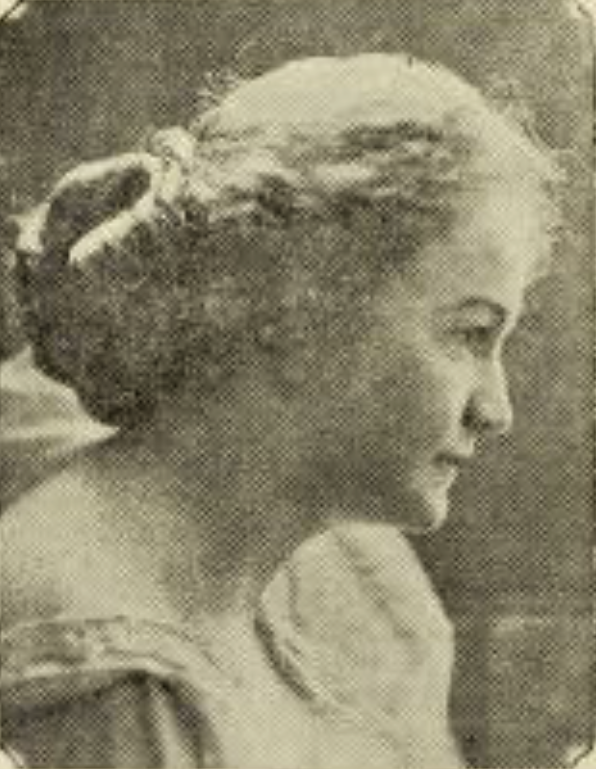
Gertrude Ross in 1924

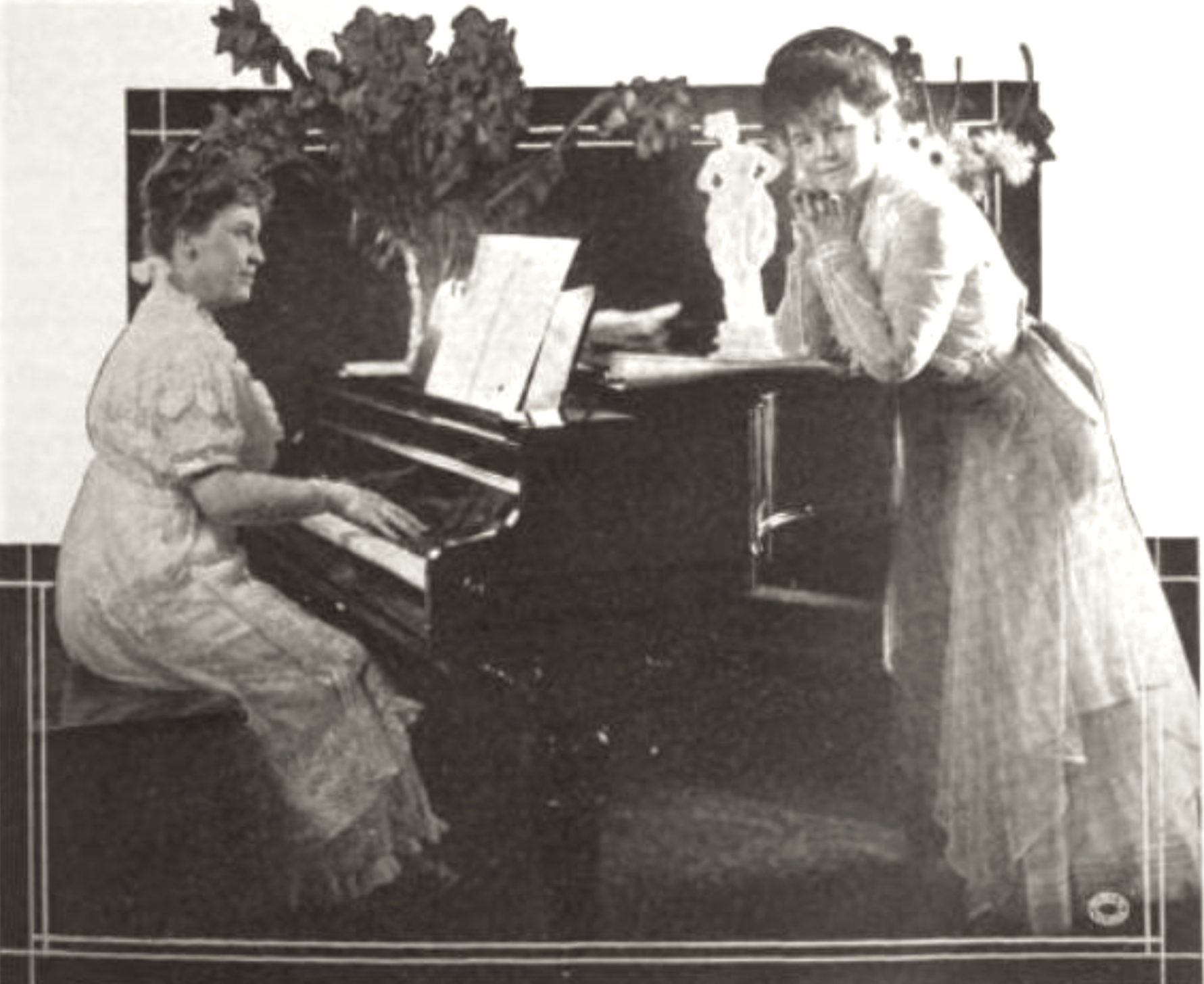
1915 photograph of Gertrude Ross playing the piano with the soprano Yvonne de Tréville listening.

Gertrude Ross (1889–1957) was an American composer and pianist who wrote music for films and stage as well as songs and instrumental works. She researched Japanese and Hebrew music for her own compositions and collected Spanish folksongs from early California settlers.

== Biography ==
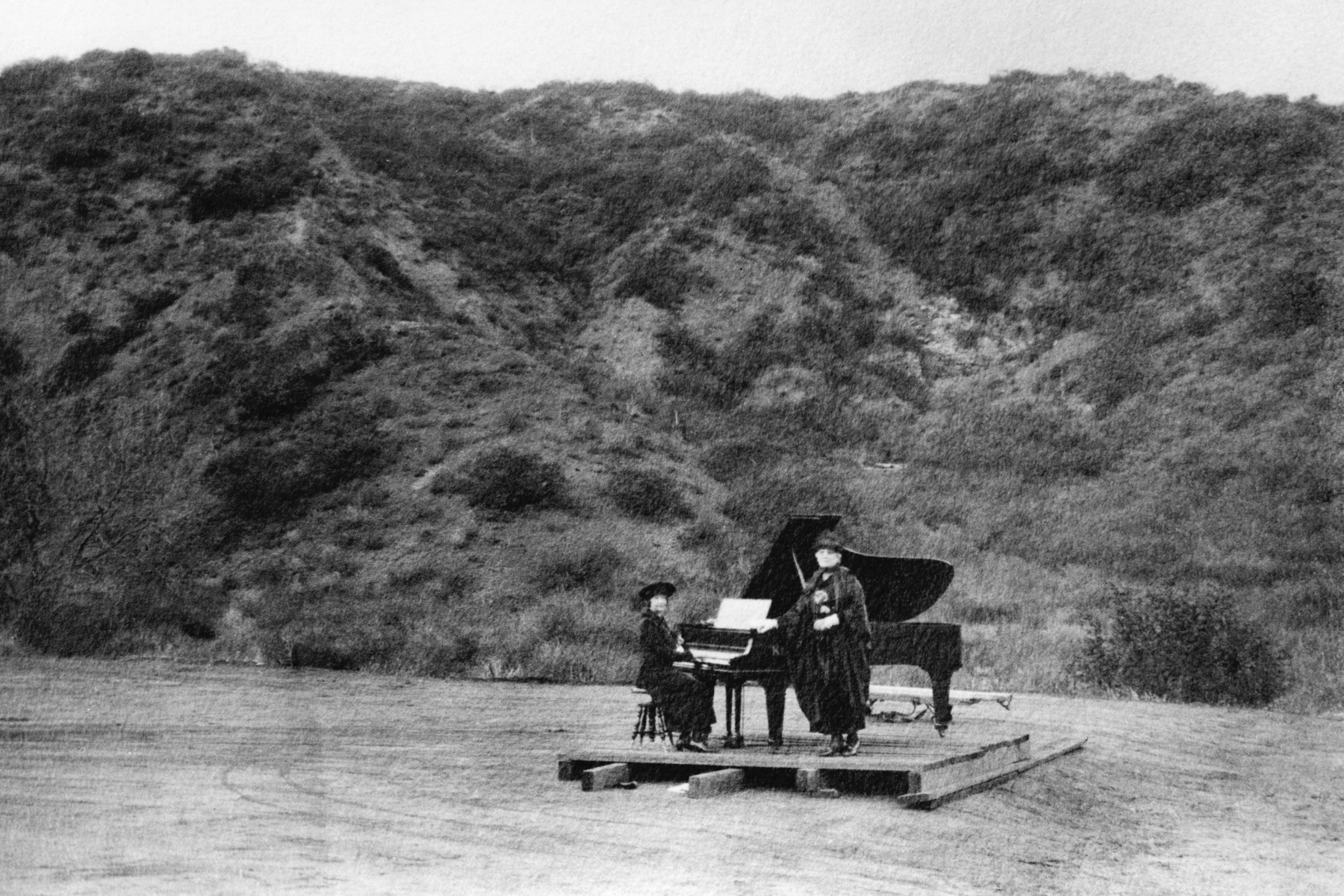
Gertrude Ross and Anna Ruzena Sprotte performing on a barn door in the first known musical event at the Hollywood Bowl, ca.1920 (CHS-14567)

Ross was born in Dayton, Ohio, to Emma Corinne McCreary and Abner L. Ross. She showed early musical talent as a child, playing music by ear and giving concerts starting at age 10. She attended the Cumnock School of Expression in Los Angeles for three years, then studied at the University of Southern California for an additional year.

Ross married in 1903 and had a daughter, Corinne, in 1904. In 1910, Ross left her husband and resumed using her maiden name. She studied piano for two years in Germany with Severin Eisenberger and Theodor Leschetitzky. Later, she studied counterpoint with Nadia Boulanger.

After returning to the U.S., Ross toured with and accompanied singers such as Katherine Fisk, Blanche Hamilton Fox, Jeanne Gerville-Reache, Ernestine Schumann-Heink, and Regina Vicarino, as well as cellist Elsa Ruegger and violinist Ignaz Heroldi. She accompanied Schumann-Heink at the 1915 San Francisco Exposition, and appeared with the Russian Symphony Orchestra Society in New York.

Ross learned Japanese and studied Japanese instruments to compose Art Songs of Japan. Japanese citizens in California gave her a key to Japan in appreciation of this work. Ross also collected and published the traditional melodies played by the early Spanish settlers of California. In 1923, she composed new music for the outdoor performance The Pilgrimage Play: The Life of Christ by Christine Wetherill, incorporating Hebrew chants, scales, and instruments like the shofar. She helped raise money to build the Hollywood Bowl and gave public lectures about the music played on its summer concert series.

In 1919, Ross helped found the California Federation of Music Clubs. The same year, she served as president of Los Angeles’ Dominant Club for female musicians. In 1928, she chaired the National Federation of Music Clubs American Composers group, as well as the Hollywood Bowl Annual Composition Prize Committee. In her role as president of the Los Angeles Pro Musica chapter, she helped sponsor early performances of Arnold Schoenberg’s music.

Ross’ works were recorded commercially by Columbia (W14770) and Victor Records (B-13820, B-28458, and BVE-34210). Her composition Three Songs of the Desert inspired paintings by Arthur Hill Gilbert. Her students included Elinor Remick Warren.

Ross’ works were published by Edwin H. Morris and Company, G. Schirmer Inc., Huntzinger & Dilworth, J. Fischer and Bros., R. W. Heffelfinger, and the White Smith Music Publishing Company.

== List of compositions ==
=== Chamber ===
- Serenade (violin, cello and piano)

=== Incidental music ===
- Courtship of Miles Standish (film)
- Dawn in the Desert (film)
- The Girl I Loved (play based on poem by James Whitcomb Riley)
- The Pilgrimage Play: The Life of Christ (text by Christine Wetherill)

=== Piano ===
- Ride of the Cowboy

=== Songs ===
- “A Fickle Maiden (Un pajarito”)
- “A Golden Thought”
- Art Songs of Japan
- “At Close of Day”
- “At Twilight” (with violin; text by Corinne B. Dodge)
- “Ay Ay Ay Vidalita”
- “Barcarolle”
- “Consider the Lilies”
- “Delight of the Out of Doors”
- Four Sonnets to the California Hills
- “God is Spirit”
- “God’s Service Flag” (text by Harold Seton)
- “I Know Not if You Love Me (Yo no sé si me quieres)”
- “Lullaby”
- “My Madonna”
- “Old Maid’s Song (Nadie me quiere”)
- “Open Road”
- “Ride of the Cowboy”
- “Roundup Lullaby: A Cowboy’s Night Song to the Cattle” (text by Badger Clark)
- “Sakura Blossom”
- “Song of Spring”
- Songs for Wee Ones
- Songs of the Desert (text by Faith Boehnke)
- Sunbonnet Songs
- War Trilogy (text by Corinne B. Dodge)
- “Wynken, Blynken and Nod” (text by Eugene Field)
