= Orquesta de Baja California =

Orquesta de Baja California (in English Baja California Orchestra) is an orchestra based in the Mexican state of Baja California.

The ensemble is a chamber orchestra of variable size, composed of about 17 to 40 musicians, and conducted by Maestro Angel Romero and Armando Pesquiera. As of mid-2006, Maestro Romero is no longer music director of the OBC, and was succeeded as music director by Maestro Ivan del Prado who is also music director of the Orquesta Sinfonica National de Cuba. The orchestra players are primarily from Latin America, but there are also several regular orchestra members from the former Soviet Bloc, as well as extra players when necessary, from the USA. In April 2005, it toured under Maestro Romero's direction with American musician Sean Bradley and some other American orchestra players to perform at Alice Tully Hall at Lincoln Center in New York.

In 2001, the OBC was nominated for a Latin Grammy in the category of "Best Classical Album" with the album “Tango mata Danzón mata Tango”/”Tango kills Danzon kills Tango” and in 2003 he accompanied the Italian tenor Luciano Pavarotti during the concert broadcast internationally from the desert of the Laguna Salada.

On April 21, 2004, the "Cultural Ambassador of the State of Baja California" designated the Orchestra in session of the State Congress, and on October 6 of that same year, it offered the inaugural concert of the XXXII Edition of the Cervantino International Festival at the Juárez Theater in the city of Guanajuato.

OBC's various tours have taken it to perform in many stages in Mexico and United States. Some of these spaces are important theaters such as the Lincoln Center in New York, the Nezahualcóyotl's Sala and the Palacio de Bellas Artes/Bellas Artes Palace.

Within his productions he has shared the stage with great artists from other musical genres such as: Nortec, Bostich & Fussible (2010), Jesusa Rodríguez (2011), Regina Orozco (2012), Mariachi Vargas de Tecatitlán (2015), and Celso Piña ( 2015, 2016 and 2017).

After twenty-five years of existence, for the first time someone from Tijuana directs the OBC. In July 2016, Maestro Armando Pesqueira was appointed as Artistic and musical director of the Baja California Orchestra.

In September 2017, the OBC offered two concerts, at the Gran Teatro Nacional and the Convent of Santo Domingo in Lima, Peru as the central event of the Embassy of Mexico in Peru.
