= Los Cinco =

Latin American composer collective

Los Cinco is also the name of the founders of the Mexican American Youth Organization.

Los Cinco (in English: "The Five") is an unofficial collective of Latin American composers living and working in Los Angeles. These composers include: Daniel Catán, Miguel del Águila, Aurelio de la Vega, Enrique González-Medina, and Carlos Rodríquez.

Meant to draw a comparison between this collective and a group of avant-garde Parisian composers active in the 1920s known as "Les Six", the term "Los Cinco" was originally coined by Sean Bradley, an American conductor. Bradley first presented these composers as a collective in public performance, and the label Los Cinco first appeared in print in a Los Angeles Times review dated August 3, 2004.

The music by these composers shares "certain common features, including a vibrancy of ideas, no fear of sensuality or humor, and an infectious passion."
