= Pennsylvania Opera Theater =

Defunct American opera company

The Pennsylvania Opera Theater (POT) was an American opera company located in Philadelphia, Pennsylvania. Founded in 1975 by Barbara Silverstein, the company presented an annual season of opera until it closed due to financial reasons in 1993. The company was dedicated to presenting new and more rarely performed works in the English language. Most of the company's performances were staged at the Merriam Theater. Silverstein served as the company's Artistic Director during its 18-year history.

The POT's first performance was on May 22, 1976 with a production of Otto Nicolai's The Merry Wives of Windsor. New works staged by the company included Margaret Garwood's Rappacini's Daughter (1983), Vincent Persichetti's The Sibyl (1985) and David Ives and Greg Pliska's The Secret Garden (1991). In 1982 the company presented the United States premiere of Haydn's Orlando paladino with tenor John Gilmore in the title role. Other rarely performed works staged by the company included Argento's Postcard from Morocco (1977), Benjamin Britten's version of John Gay's The Beggar's Opera (1978), Francesco Cavalli's Ormindo (1979), Offenbach's La belle Hélène (1980), Mark Bucci's Sweet Betsy From Pike (1980), David Amram's Twelfth Night (1981), Rossini's Le comte Ory (1981), Donizetti's Il furioso all'isola di San Domingo (1982), Weil's The Threepenny Opera (1984), Britten's The Turn of the Screw (1987), Henry Purcell's The Fairy-Queen (1988), and Robert Ward's The Crucible (1989). The company's final performance was of Mozart's Così fan tutte on May 14, 1993 at the Merriam Theater with Jennifer Jones as Fiordiligi, Janine Hawley as Dorabella, Matthew Lau as Guglielmo, Robert Baker as Ferrando, Sara Seglem as Despina, and Robert Holden as Don Alfonso.
