= Yvonne de Tréville =

American opera singer (1881–1954)

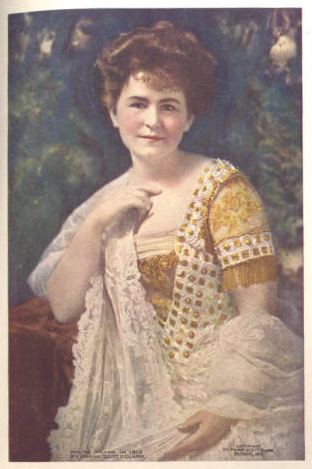
Yvonne de Tréville, from a 1913 promotional brochure; from "Traveling Culture: Circuit Chautauqua in the Twentieth Century", University of Iowa Libraries, Special Collections department.

Yvonne de Tréville (August 25, 1881 — January 25, 1954) was an American coloratura soprano, born Edyth Le Gierse.

== Early life ==
Edyth Le Gierse was born in Galveston, Texas; her father was French-speaking, and her mother was from New Orleans, Louisiana. She studied voice with Mathilde Marchesi in Paris.

== Career ==
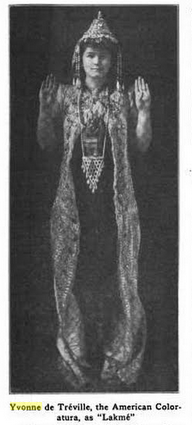
Yvonne de Tréville as "Lakme" (1916).

Yvonne de Tréville made her debut in New York in 1897, and the next year was playing Mimi in the New York debut of Puccini's La Bohème. In 1902 she first appeared with the Paris Opéra-Comique as Lakmé. Over the following decade, she sang in Stockholm, St. Petersburg, Budapest, Nice, Berlin, Bucharest, Prague, Frankfurt, Cologne, Hanover, Cairo, and Brussels; she was noted for her strong language skills. She sang Mimi again at the Vienna Court Opera in 1909 and 1910. She returned to the United States in 1912. Tréville appeared on the Broadway stage in Carmen in 1918 and 1919.

In her later career she focused on concert singing, touring, arranging songs, and teaching voice in New York. She was associated with the Interstate Grand Opera Company, to bring opera music to the American midwest. Composers Mary Carr Moore, Gertrude Ross, and Gena Branscombe composed and dedicated songs to Yvonne de Tréville, songs which she performed in her Three Centuries of Prime Donne show for several seasons. In 1914, she sang a recital at sea for the sailors, after her concert appearances in Honolulu, Hawaii.

During World War I she was active performing for war relief causes. She gave a concert for the Aviation Corps in Mineola, New York, and at a rally for the American Red Cross. She also chaired a wartime committee promoting the writing of new patriotic songs. In 1925, she appeared in the world premiere of Charles Wakefield Cadman's opera The Garden of Mystery at Carnegie Hall.

== Personal life ==
Yvonne de Tréville died in 1954, aged 72 years.
