= Elizabeth Spencer (soprano) =

American singer

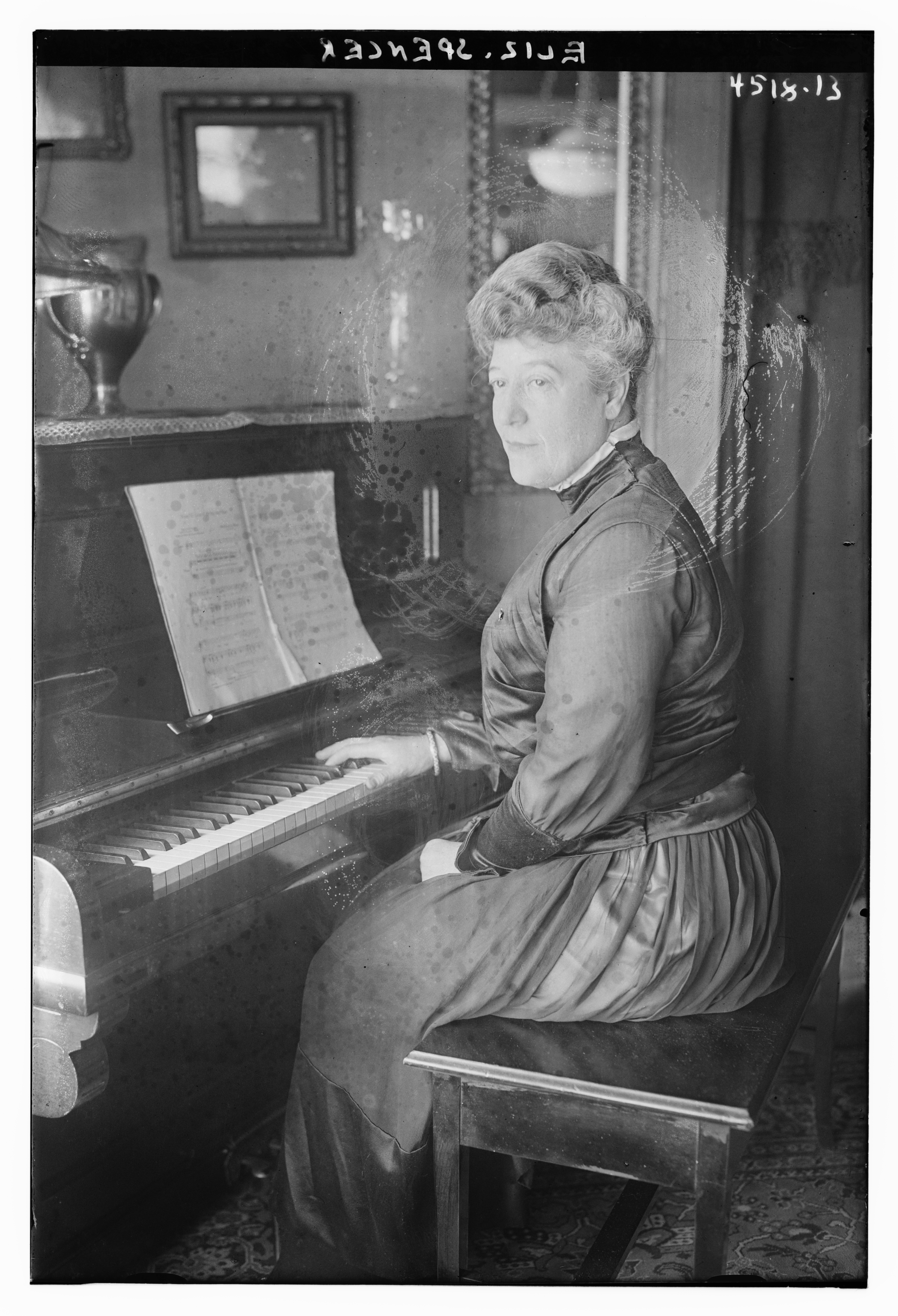
Elizabeth Spencer in 1915

Elizabeth Dickerson Spencer (April 12, 1871 – April 22, 1930) was an American dramatic soprano, or mezzo-soprano during the later 19th century and early 20th century who is best known for the numerous early recordings she made for Thomas Edison.

== Biography ==
Elizabeth Dickerson was born in 1871 to Julia Armentine (Pratte) Dickerson and Col. John M. Dickerson. Her father died eight months later, and in 1874, her mother remarried, to Col. William Gilpin, who had served as the first governor of the Territory of Colorado in 1861. The family moved to Denver.

Elizabeth was trained as a singer as well as a pianist and violinist. After graduating from St. Mary's Academy, she toured Europe. On her return, she married Otis Spencer, a lawyer.

Spencer began her career singing in local churches, concerts, clubs, and amateur theatricals. By 1905, she had a successful solo show at the local Orpheum Theatre, a vaudeville venue. This and other engagements led to roles on Broadway, and by 1910 she had moved to New York.

Spencer signed an exclusive contract to record for Thomas Edison, and she is today best known for these early recordings on which she sang solos, as well as taking part in duets, trios, quartets, and choruses. Her recordings for Edison Standard Records extended from around 1910 until 1916 and amounted to over 660 sessions, more than any other vocalist for the company. She recorded on both phonograph cylinders and a later Diamond Disc format, and her best recordings are on the latter, which more accurately reproduced her voice. Her most successful recordings were "In the Valley of the Moon" and "Somewhere a Voice Is Calling", both duets with Vernon Archibald. She also participated in demonstrations of recording fidelity arranged by Edison in which she sang along with a phonograph under dim lighting, and the audience had to guess when she stopped singing and the phonograph took over completely.

After Spencer's contract with Edison ended in 1916, she moved to Victor, but had returned to Edison by 1920. Her recordings tail off in the 1920s.

"Just Awearyin' for You"
1911 recording of Spencer singing "Just Awearyin' for You"

1913 recording of Spencer singing "I Love You, California"

Spencer's voice is noted for its sterling operatic quality combined with ability to sing in the vernacular.

Spencer died in Montclair, New Jersey, in 1930. She was inducted into the Colorado Music Hall of Fame in 2016.
