= Somewhere a Voice Is Calling =

1911 song written by Eileen Newton and composed by Arthur F. Tate

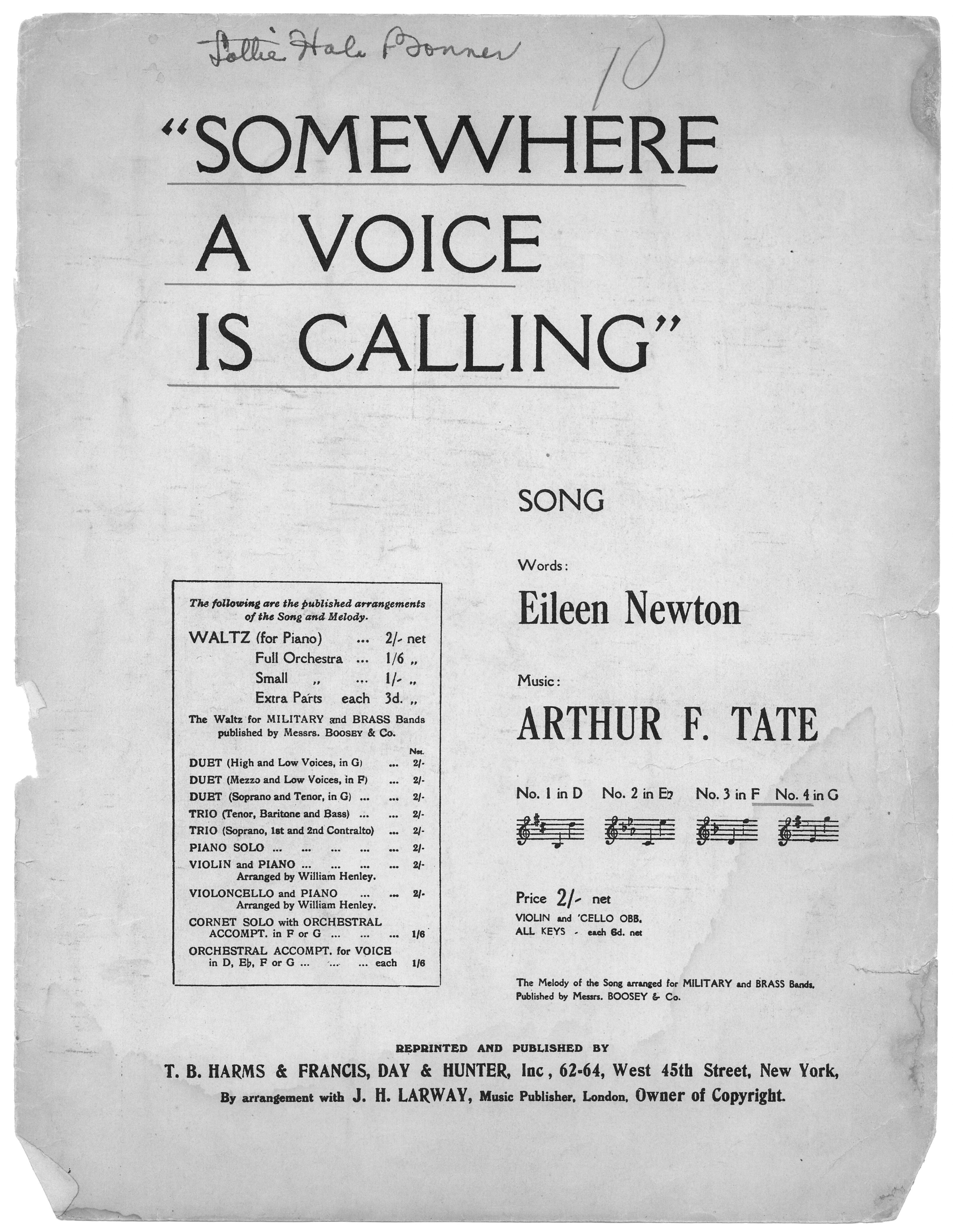
- Sheet music cover

Song
- Released: 1911
- Composer(s): Arthur F. Tate
- Lyricist(s): Eileen Newton

"Somewhere a Voice Is Calling" is a World War I song originally released in 1911. Arthur F. Tate composed the song and Eileen Newton wrote the lyrics. The song was published by T. B. Harms & Francis, Day & Hunter, Inc. in New York City.

The song was recorded on October 29, 1913, by vocalist Henry Burr in Camden, New Jersey. This version was released under the Victor record label.

In 1914, John McCormack recorded "Somewhere a Voice Is Calling". It was released under the Victor record label.

Another best-selling 1914 version was by Vernon Archibald and Elizabeth Spencer, released on Edison's Blue Amberol cylinders.

== Lyrics ==
Dusk, and the shadows falling,
O'er land and sea;
Somewhere a voice is calling,
Calling for me!
Night and the stars are gleaming,
Tender and true;
Dearest! my heart is dreaming,
Dreaming of you!
