= Orlando paladino =

Opera by Joseph Haydn

- Opera by Joseph Haydn
- Portrait of Haydn by Thomas Hardy, 1791
- Translation: The paladin Orlando
- Librettist: Nunziato Porta
- Language: Italian
- Based on: Ludovico Ariosto's Orlando furioso
- Premiere: 6 December 1782; Eszterháza

Orlando paladino (The paladin Orlando), Hob. 28/11, is an opera in three acts by Joseph Haydn which was first performed at Eszterháza on 6 December 1782. The libretto by Nunziato Porta is based on another libretto, Le pazzie d'Orlando, by Carlo Francesco Badini (set by the composer Pietro Alessandro Guglielmi in 1771), itself inspired by Ariosto's epic poem Orlando furioso. The opera was described as a dramma eroicomico and the plot mixes heroic and comic elements. It was Haydn's most popular opera during his lifetime. While in Prague, Mozart conducted a few performances of the opera. The Pennsylvania Opera Theater presented the United States premiere of the work at the Trocadero Theatre, Philadelphia, in March 1982 with John Gilmore in the title role. More recently, staged performances have been given in 2009 at the Berlin State Opera with René Jacobs conducting, and in 2016 at the Zurich Opera House conducted by Gianluca Capuano. In 2023, Il Giardino Armonico conducted by Giovanni Antonini gave concert performances at the Gran Teatre del Liceu and the Teatro Real, with cast including Emőke Baráth, Nuria Rial, Alasdair Kent and Josh Lovell.

== Background of the text ==
The adventures of Roland (Orlando in Italian), the nephew and paladin of Charlemagne, formed already during the Middle Ages the basis for a great work of art. The Chanson de Roland, written around the year 1100, praises the knight's valour in his fight against the Saracens and his noble death at Ronceval, where he was ambushed by vastly superior forces. The Renaissance added a romantic note to this heroic narrative. Matteo Maria Boiardo's unfinished epic poem Orlando innamorato and still more its sequel describe an amorous episode which reputedly took place during an earlier part of Roland's life. The paladin falls passionately in love the beautiful princess Angelica, who came to the court of Charlemagne from distant Cathay. The maiden rejects his entreaties, however, as she feels strongly attracted to the gentle knight Medoro. Thereupon sorrow clouds Roland's mind and he turns into a ferocious madman. Eventually the intervention of higher powers restores his sanity.

== Roles ==
Roles, voice types, premiere cast
Role	Voice type	Premiere cast, 6 December 1782
Alcina, a sorceress	soprano	Costanza Valdesturla
Angelica, Queen of Cathay	soprano	Matilde Bologna
Medoro, in love with Angelica	tenor	Prospero Braghetti
Caronte (Charon), ferryman to the underworld	bass	Leopold Dichtler
Eurilla, a shepherdess	soprano	Maria Antonia Specioli
Licone, a shepherd	tenor	Leopold Dichtler
Orlando, Paladin of France	tenor	Antonio Specioli
Pasquale, Orlando's squire	tenor	Vincenzo Moratti
Rodomonte, King of Barbaria	bass	Domenico Negri
Shepherds, shepherdesses, spectres, savages and Saracens – chorus

The opera makes a reference to castrati during Pasquale's aria from act two, "Ecco spiano", during which he sings Ah, che un musico castrato come me non canta affé (Even a castrato cannot sing as well as me). The same aria is also notable for requiring the tenor to go into falsetto to hit some of the high notes.

== Synopsis ==
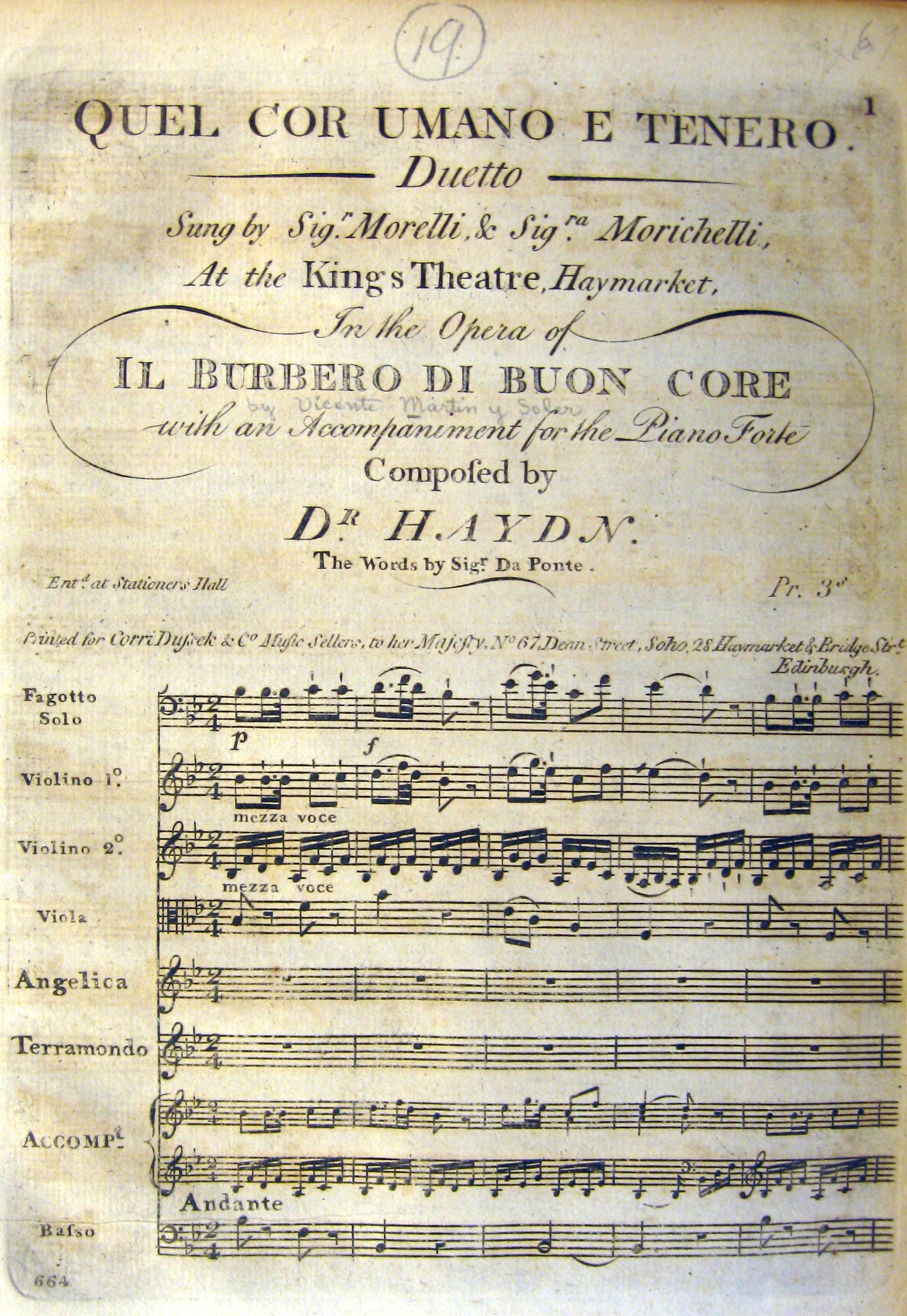
First page of the insertion duet, "Quel cor umano e tenero", composed by Joseph Haydn, words by Lorenzo Da Ponte. The caption indicates it was performed in Vicente Martín y Soler's opera Il burbero di buon cuore as sung by Anna Morichelli and Giovanni Morelli (in performances beginning 17 May 1794 at King's Theatre, London). This duet is actually an adaptation of Haydn's duet "Quel tuo visetto amabile" from this opera Orlando paladino

=== Act 1 ===
Scene 1 – A mountainous landscape.

The shepherdess Eurilla and her father Licone are alarmed by the appearance of a threatening knight, searching for Angelica and Medoro. Eurilla tells him of their love and that they have taken refuge in the nearby castle. The knight reveals himself as Rodomonte, King of Barbary, infatuated with Angelica and intent on protecting her from Orlando's jealousy.

Scene 2 – Angelica's tower.

Angelica laments that she has to live in hiding to avoid Orlando's mad frenzy. She summons the sorceress Alcina, who offers her protection. Medoro now enters with the unwelcome news that Orlando and his squire Pasquale have been sighted nearby but is unsure whether to stay or escape.

Scene 3 – A wood. Pasquale is discovered by Rodomonte, who proceeds to challenge him, but is distracted by Eurilla, who says that Orlando is nearby looking for him. Alone with Eurilla, Pasquale explains that his life of adventure is blighted by a constant lack of food (and love).

Scene 4 – A garden with a fountain.

Medoro swears his fidelity to Angelica but despite her protests suggests that for her own safety he should leave her for a time. When they have gone, Orlando appears, cursing the obsession that drives him on, convinced that Medoro is the only obstacle to the fulfilment of his love. He sees that Medoro has carved Angelica's name on every tree in the garden and smashes down the trees and fountain.

Scene 5 – A grove. The braggart Rodomonte is still in pursuit of Orlando and narrowly misses him when he arrives to interrogate Eurilla, on the whereabouts of Medoro.

Scene 6 – A delightful garden.

Angelica's fearful premonitions are interrupted by Pasquale and Eurilla, who warn her of Orlando's approach. Rodomonte joins them, still eager to fight Orlando, and then the peace-loving Medoro, in fear of Orlando's prowess enters. Alcina appears and reassures the lovers, while warning Rodomonte that he cannot defeat Orlando. Orlando bursts in raving, but Alcina magically immobilises him and imprisons him in an iron cage.

=== Act 2 ===
Scene 1 – A grove.

Orlando has been freed from the cage, but not from his madness. Rodomonte is once more about to attack him, but when Eurilla brings news that Medoro and Angelica have fled, Orlando dashes off in pursuit.

Scene 2 – A wide plain by the sea

Medoro seeks refuge by the sea, and at Eurilla's suggestion, conceals himself in a grotto, asking her to tell Angelica of his unhappy fate. Eurilla and Pasquale discover their love for one another as she invites him to follow her to a castle. Angelica laments her suffering. Alcina plans to resolve the lovers’ difficulties. As Angelica is about the throw herself into the sea in despair, Alcina's magic transports her to Medoro's presence and they re-affirm their love. They are on the point of seeking a new refuge when Orlando appears, but Alcina intervenes again to allow the lovers to escape. Orlando is distracted by the sudden appearance of two sea-monsters.

Scene 3 – A room in the castle

Pasquale and Eurilla exchange more endearments. Rodomonte enters with Alcina, who invites all to her magic grotto.
Scene 4 – Alcina's enchanted cave.
Orlando and Pasquale arrive in search of Alcina, and the paladin furiously insults the sorceress for protecting Medoro. She responds by turning him to stone. Angelica, Medoro, Eurilla and Rodomonte enter, marvelling at this sight. Alcina restores Orlando to his human state, but his frenzy is unabated. As Alcina retires to the back of the cave Orlando pursues her and the rock closes in behind him.

=== Act 3 ===
Scene 1 – The Underworld, by the river Lethe, the Elysian Fields beyond

Charon, the infernal ferryman, watches over the sleeping Orlando. Alcina commands him to wash away Orlando's madness with water from the river of forgetfulness, and Orlando awakens confused.

Scene 2 – A room in the castle

While discussing their marriage, Eurilla and Pasquale are interrupted by Orlando, seeking his squire's aid.

Scene 3 – A forest

Angelica is pursued by wild savages. Medoro rushes to her assistance but is wounded. Rodomonte and Orlando engage in a duel.

Scene 4 – A courtyard

Angelica is delirious, believing that Medoro is dead. Alcina assures her that this is not so, but that he is healed of his wounds. Rodomonte and Orlando enter together, now comrades. The waters of Lethe have blanked from Orlando's mind both his love for Angelica and his hatred of Medoro. Angelica and Medoro can now love one another without fear, Pasquale and Eurilla are united, and Orlando may go in search of fresh deeds of valour.

The opera is scored for flute, two oboes, two bassoons, two horns/trumpets, timpani, strings, continuo.

== Recordings ==
- Orlando paladino, Arleen Auger, Elly Ameling, George Shirley, Lausanne CO, conducted by Antal Doráti (Philips, 1977)
- Orlando paladino, Patricia Petibon, Christian Gerhaher, Michael Schade, Elisabeth von Magnus, Concentus Musicus Wien, conducted by Nikolaus Harnoncourt (Deutsche Harmonia Mundi, 2006)
- Thomas Quasthoff recorded Rodomonte's aria, "Mille lampi d'accese faville", and Caronte's aria, "Ombre insepolte" on his album, Haydn Italian Arias (2009) and Anne Sofie von Otter recorded "Ad un sguardo, a un cenno solo" on her Mozart-Haydn-Gluck album with Trevor Pinnock.
- "Orlando Paladino", Marlis Petersen, Alexandrina Pendatchanska, Sunhae Im, Tom Randle, Pietro Spagnoli, Magnus Staveland, Victor Torres, Arttu Kataj. René Jacobs.(Berlin State Opera, 2009) Naxos 2057788. DVD and Blu-ray.
