= Elizabeth Lennox =

American singer (1894–1992)

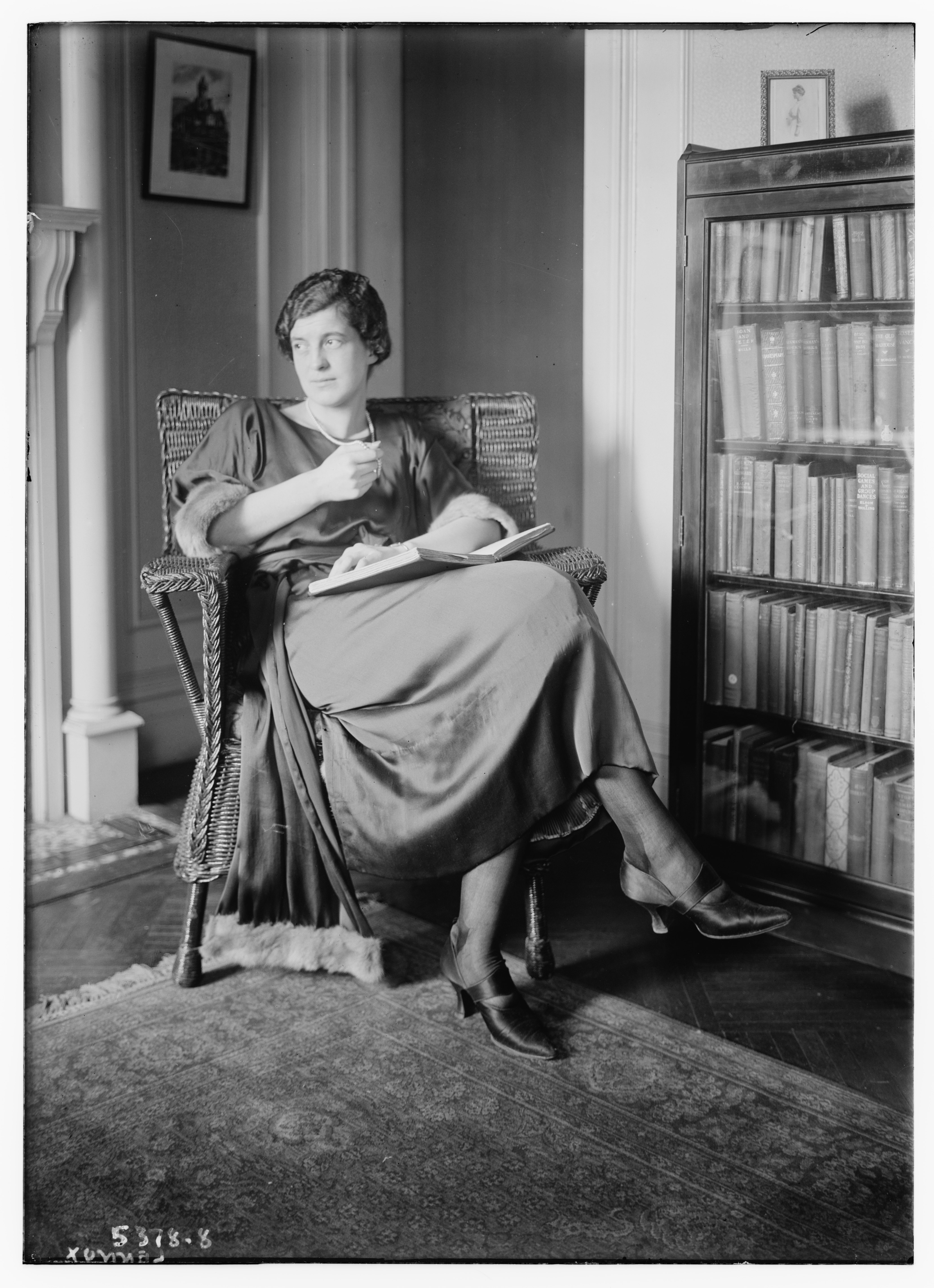
- Elizabeth Lennox, from the George Grantham Bain Collection, Library of Congress
- Born: March 16, 1894; Ionia, Michigan, U.S.
- Died: May 3, 1992 (aged 98); Fairfield, Connecticut, U.S.
- Other names: Louise Terrell, Elizabeth Lennox Hughes
- Occupation: Singer

Elizabeth Lennox (March 16, 1894 – May 3, 1992), also known as Louise Terrell, was an American contralto singer. She made over 150 musical recordings in the 1920s, on the Brunswick, Edison, Victor, and Columbia labels.

== Early life ==
Elizabeth Lennox was born in Ionia, Michigan the daughter of Lambert E. Lennox and Hester Anna Tyrell Lennox. Her parents were from Canada. Her father was a Methodist clergyman, and her older sister Olive Lennox was a pianist who sometimes accompanied her. She graduated from the Cosmopolitan School of Music in Chicago. Her father's work meant that she lived in various towns as a child; she counted Benton Harbor, Michigan as one of her hometowns.

== Career ==
Lennox began her professional singing career as a church soloist in Chicago, and in New York. She sang mainly in concert and oratorio programs, and made over 150 recordings in the 1920s, on the Brunswick, Edison, Victor, and Columbia labels. Some of her recordings were made under the name "Louise Terrell" (using a variation on her mother's maiden name). She explained that making recordings helped her hear her own voice and find where improvements were needed. "People may try to flatter you by saying you are singing perfectly," she said, "but the record certainly shows up every little imperfection in a wonderful way."

Lennox also taught voice in Michigan, as a young woman. She and accompanist Ann Straton Miller made a national concert tour during the 1921–1922 season. In the 1930s she often performed on radio programs, including on the American Album of Popular Music, and in a regular weekly slot on CBS Radio's "Broadway Varieties" show.

After she retired from professional performance in the 1940s, she was program committee chair of the South Shore Music Club, a women's club in Connecticut, and was executive vice-president of the Connecticut Symphony Orchestra.

== Personal life ==
Lennox was tall, "distinctly the type for whom tailored clothes were made," according to a 1937 profile. She married George Percival Hughes, an advertising executive, in 1922. Their son David Gratton Hughes was born in 1926. Her husband died in 1967, and she died in 1992, aged 98 years, in Fairfield, Connecticut. Her son became a musicologist on the faculty at Harvard University. Her granddaughter Catherine E. C. Hughes was a television news reporter and an Emmy-nominated filmmaker.
