= Vernon Archibald =

American baritone singer

Vernon Archibald (June 30, 1886 – May 24, 1964) was an American baritone. He was born in Morocco, Indiana. According to Joel Whitburn's chart approximations, he had best-selling recordings with renditions of "In the Valley of the Moon" and "Somewhere a Voice is Calling", both duets with Elizabeth Spencer released on Edison's Blue Amberol cylinders and Diamond Discs. In the late 1920s Archibald was a founding member of the American Singers, who recorded for both Edison and Victor Records. This group was frequently found on the radio and performing on the stage circuit.
