= Margaret Garwood =

American composer (1927–2015)

Margaret Garwood (March 22, 1927, Haddonfield, New Jersey – May 3, 2015, Philadelphia) was an American composer who is best known for her operas.

She turned into composition relatively late in her life, at age 35. She stated that through composition, she had "found her fulfilment" in life. About her late start in composition, she stated that before she was 35, she "...was totally absorbed in becoming a concert pianist at that time, and taught and coached singers, accompanied, played chamber music, played in cocktail lounges, worked with an opera company." Garwood became best known for her operatic adaptation of literary works by Nathaniel Hawthorne, including The Scarlet Letter and "Rappaccini's Daughter". She also composed works for instrumental chamber ensembles, orchestras, and other vocal ensembles. Many of her works were commissioned by the Pennsylvania Opera Theater.

Garwood received a master's degree in Composition from the University of the Arts in Philadelphia, where her husband Dr. Donald Chittum worked as a professor of world music and music theory. She taught at Muhlenberg College, where she taught students like composer Andrea Clearfield.

Margaret Garwood died on May 3, 2015, in her home in Wyncote, at age 88, from acute heart failure.

== Biography ==
=== Early life and education ===
Garwood was born in New Jersey on March 22, 1927. Her father, Morse Garwood, was a tax lawyer, and her mother, Miriam Frew, was a feminist housewife. She also had a brother, Charles Garwood, who was born in 1930. There were no musicians in her immediate family, but music was always present in her family through audio recordings and radio broadcasts of the music of Richard Wagner and Ludwig van Beethoven. Her first musical experiences involved playing songs on the piano by ear when she was six years old. At this age, she started to have formal piano lessons with Carol Johnston Sharpe.

When Garwood was fourteen, her family moved to a farm in Chester County, Pennsylvania. She continued her piano studies with Allison Drake from the Philadelphia Conservatory for two years. She also received lessons from Earle Echternacht, a private instructor in Lancaster, for an additional year.

Garwood moved from Chester County to Philadelphia with her mother in 1944 when her parents divorced. In Philadelphia, Garwood continued her piano studies while her mother worked for Planned Parenthood, first as a field worker and then as an administrator.

=== University of the Arts ===
In 1950, she took a job with a local opera company as an assistant to composer and director Romeo Cascarino. Eventually, Garwood and Cascarino married in 1953. She learned about composition and orchestration by listening to his music and observing his writing process. During this time, she taught piano at the University of the Arts in Philadelphia. Here she met Donald Chittum, who became a strong supporter of her work, and eventually her husband.

From 1958 to 1970, Garwood would commute from Philadelphia to New York City to study with Joseph Prostakoff, himself a student of Abby Whiteside. In 1964, while studying with Prostakoff, Garwood began working as a composer. Prostakoff introduced Garwood to Miriam Gideon, another Abby Whiteside student. Gideon became Garwood's composition mentor. Gideon served as an educated and informed soundboard for when Garwood needed assistance with her compositions. This relationship lasted until Gideon's death in 1996.

She said, "I didn't believe pianists should go to college. They should stay home and practice. To this end, I studied piano extensively, going to New York every week for 12 years, and took courses that I felt like taking at the Philadelphia Music Academy. In 1975, after my second divorce, I applied for a teaching job at Muhlenberg University in Allentown, but although I had been teaching from 1953 to 1970 at the University of the Arts in Philadelphia, I needed a Master's degree in order to teach at Muhlenberg."

=== Muhlenberg College ===
In 1969, Garwood met and married her second husband, economist Joe Oberman. In 1970, they moved to a farm in East Greenville, two hours from Philadelphia. During this time, Garwood developed a rabbit growing business. She resumed teaching piano in 1975 in Muhlenberg College in Allentown, Pennsylvania. Garwood and Oberman divorced in 1979, and Garwood resumed her teaching in Muhlenberg College until 1984.

In 1981, Garwood married Dr. Donald Chittum, a professor of music at the University of the Arts in Philadelphia. Chittum insisted Garwood quit her teaching career to focus on her compositional work. Garwood's compositional process tended to be slow and careful, a trait she learned from her experiences with Romeo Cascarino.

She has been the recipient of fellowships and awards from the National Endowment of the Arts, the MacDowell Colony, the National Opera Institute, and the National Federation of Music Clubs.

== Death ==
Margaret Garwood died on May 3, 2015, in her home in Wyncote, Pennsylvania, at age 83, from acute heart failure.

== Music ==
=== Notable works ===
Most of Garwood's musical output consisted of vocal works, but she also composed a variety of chamber pieces, including:

1. Cliff's Edge, Songs of a Psychotic for Voice & Piano (1970)
  1. Squizophrenia
  2. Hebephrenia
  3. Panic
  4. Breakdown
  5. Asylum
2. Haiku Zoo, For Chorus (1975)
  1. The Whippoorwill, a semi-madrigal
  2. The Scarecrow, a quasi invention
  3. The Frog, an antiphonal trifle
  4. The Dragonfly, lament for a dead child
  5. The Cow, a fugue
  6. The Cat, a pseudo-oratorio
3. Homages, for Piano Trio (1975)
4. Rainsongs, for Chorus & Orchestra (Part of Choral Trilogy) (1992)
  1. When that I was a little tiny boy
  2. All day long the rain has fallen
  3. What lips my lips have kissed
5. Six Japanese Songs, for voice, clarinet & piano (1967)
  1. Loneliness
  2. From "Essences"
  3. Iris
  4. Death Song
  5. Two White Butterflies
  6. Snow
6. Flowersongs, for chorus and orchestra (Part of Choral Trilogy)
  1. These children singing in stone
  2. When faces called flowers float out of the ground
  3. If there are any heavens my mother will (all by herself) have
7. Tombsongs, for chorus & orchestra (part of Choral Trilogy) (1989)
  1. Sea dirge
  2. Tell Me Where Is Fancy Bred
  3. Dirge Without Music
8. Soliloquy for saxophone and piano (1992)
9. Rappaccini's Daughter (1983, commissioned by the Pennsylvania Opera Theater)
10. The Nightingale and the Rose (1973, commissioned by the Pennsylvania Opera Company; also performed by Opera Delaware)
11. The Scarlet Letter (2010, premiered by the Academy of Vocal Arts at the Merriam Theater in Philadelphia in 2010)
12. The Trojan Woman (1967, commissioned by the Pennsylvania Opera Company)
13. Joringel and the Songflower (1987)
