= Daniel Catán =

Mexican composer and writer (1949–2011)

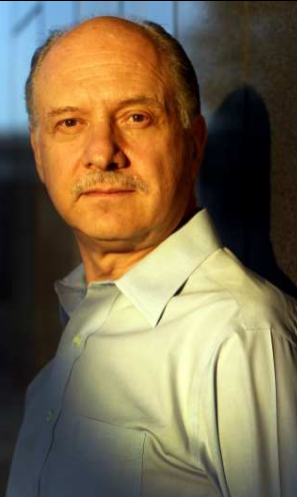
- Born: Daniel Catán Porteny; April 3, 1949; Mexico City, Mexico
- Died: April 9, 2011 (aged 62); Austin, Texas, U.S.
- Occupation(s): Composer, writer, professor
- Years active: 1972–2011
- Website: danielcatan.com

Daniel Catán Porteny (April 3, 1949 – April 9, 2011) was a Mexican composer, writer and professor known particularly for his operas and his contribution of the Spanish language to the international repertory.

With a compositional style described as lush, romantic and lyrical, Catán's second opera, Rappaccini’s Daughter, became the first Mexican opera in the United States to be produced by a professional opera company. Upon receiving international recognition, Catán's next opera, Florencia en el Amazonas, became the first opera in Spanish to be commissioned by an opera company in the United States. Shortly after, Catán received a Plácido Domingo Award and a Guggenheim Fellowship Award for his contributions to music. In 2004, Catán's opera Salsipuedes: a Tale of Love, War and Anchovies was premiered by the Houston Grand Opera. In September 2010, his opera Il Postino was premiered by the Los Angeles Opera with Plácido Domingo singing as Pablo Neruda, a role written specifically for him. Catán died while working on his next opera, Meet John Doe.

Catán's works also include vocal, chamber, orchestral and choral music as well as music for ballet, film and TV.

== Early life and education ==
Catán was born in Mexico City and was of Sephardic Jewish descent. He studied philosophy at the University of Sussex and music at the University of Southampton. He received a Ph.D. from Princeton University, where he studied with Milton Babbitt, James K. Randall, and Benjamin Boretz.

== Career ==
Catán was the first Mexican composer to have an opera produced in the United States, when San Diego Opera produced his opera Rappaccini's Daughter in March 1994. He has also composed orchestral and chamber works and film music. His style can be described as neo-impressionist. His music is richly lyrical, often painting evocative colours with the orchestral palette with soaring melodies atop.

In addition to composition, Catán had a fruitful career as a writer on music and the arts, reflective of his knowledge of world literature. In 1998, Catán received the Plácido Domingo Award for his contribution to opera, and he received a Guggenheim Fellowship in 2000. His last completed opera, Il Postino, whose premiere featured Plácido Domingo in the role of Pablo Neruda, is based on the 1983 novel Ardiente paciencia by Antonio Skármeta and the 1994 film Il Postino by Michael Radford; it premiered at the Los Angeles Opera in September 2010.

Catán died aged 62 on April 8, 2011, in Austin, Texas, a few days after he attended rehearsals for Il Postino at the Moores Opera Center at the University of Houston. At the time of his death, Catán was a member of the faculty at College of the Canyons and had been commissioned by the Sarah and Ernest Butler School of Music at the University of Texas at Austin to write a new opera, Meet John Doe.

== Compositional style ==
Catán composed his music in a neo-Romantic and lyrical style. Opera News stated that his music had "a distinctive lushness that seemed of a piece with the twentieth century's great movie music yet remained unquestionably operatic in scope." Accountable to constraints of their commissions, Catán's compositions stand clearly self-contained. Music critic David Patrick Stearns wrote, "Though Catán's style was often compared to that of Puccini and Debussy, it changed with every work, from the lush nature painting of Florencia en El Amazonas (1996) to the Cuban ethnic influences of Salsipuedes (2004), and the more integrated sonorities that portrayed the inner emotions of Il Postino (2010). Other critics noted the influences of Richard Strauss and Heitor Villa-Lobos with his orchestral structures.

Of his own music Catán said, "I have inherited a very rich operatic tradition. In my work, I am proud to say, one can detect the enormous debt I owe to composers from Monteverdi to Alban Berg. But perhaps the greatest of my debts is having learnt that the originality of an opera need not involve the rejection of our tradition—which would be like blindly embracing the condition of an orphan—but rather the profound assimilation of it, so as to achieve the closest union between a text and its music." Catán also cited in many interviews Igor Stravinsky, Maurice Ravel, and Erich Wolfgang Korngold among those who had most influenced his music and compositional style.

== Personal life ==
Catán was married three times, the first two marriages ending with divorce. He and his first wife Liza had two children. He lived in South Pasadena, California at the time of his death.

== Works ==
Ballet

- Ausencia de flores (Absence of Flowers) (1983)

Chamber and instrumental

- Quintet (1972)
- Trío (1982)
- Cuando bailas, Leonor (1984)
- Adagio (tema del amor) (1994)
- Encantamiento, for flute and harp (2003)
- Sexteto (2003-2004)
- Concertino (2005)
- Divertimento (2005)
- Amaya (2009)

Choral

- Cantata (1981)
- O, Pardon Me, Thou Bleeding Piece of Earth (2006)

Film, theater and TV

- El medallón de Mantelillos (1982)
- Antonieta: A Musical (1992-1993)
- El vuelo del águila (Don Porfirio) (1994)
- I'm Losing You (1996)

Opera

- Encuentro en el ocaso (1979)
- La hija de Rappaccini (1989)
- La hija de Rappaccini (Reduced alternate orchestration) (1989)
- Florencia en el Amazonas (1996)
- Salsipuedes: a Tale of Love, War and Anchovies (1999)
- Il Postino (2010)
- Meet John Doe (Incomplete) (2010)

Orchestral

- Hetaera Esmeralda (1975)
- El Árbol de la Vida: variaciones sinfónicas (The Tree of Life) (1980)
- En un Doblez del Tiempo (A Fold in Time) (1982)
- Tu son, tu risa, tu sonrisa (1991)
- El vuelo del águila (Don Porfirio) (The Eagle's Flight) (1994)
- Florencia en el Amazonas: Suite for Orchestra (2003)

Solo Instrument

- Variaciones para piano ca (1977)
- Encantamiento, for 2 recorders (1989)
- Vals “Don Porfirio” (1994)
- Son de Salsipuedes (1999)

Solo Voice and Piano

- “Giovanni’s Aria” (1983-1989)
- “Contristada” (1991)
- “Del Destino” (1996)
- “Duet Act I (Now that I Have Found You)” (1992-1993)
- “Comprendo” (1992-1993)
- “Nothing can go Wrong” (1992-1993)
- “Song (When I am dead)” (1992-1993)
- “There were days” (1992-1993)
- “Trust, Antonieta…” (1992-1993)
- “You that think love…” (1992-1993)
- “Hail the World’s Soul and Mine!” (Undated)

Soloist and Orchestra

- Ocaso de medianoche (1977)
- Mariposa de obsidiana (1984)
- Terra Final (1985)
- Caribbean Airs (2007)

Books

- Partitura inacabada (1989)

== See also ==
- Los Cinco
