= Tessie Mobley =

American opera singer

- Tessie Mobley in the 1930s
- Born: December 4, 1906; Ardmore, Oklahoma
- Died: December 19, 1990 (aged 84); Fort Worth, Texas
- Other names: Lushanya Vinay
- Citizenship: American
- Occupation: Opera singer

Tessie Mobley (December 4, 1906 – December 19, 1990) was an American operatic soprano.

Mobley was the daughter of Benjamin E. and Tennie Worsham Mobley, and was raised near Ardmore, Oklahoma. Her father was white and her mother was Chickasaw, listed on the Dawes Rolls. One of her sisters was Marie Muchmore, who would go on to witness, and film, the assassination of John F. Kennedy. One-quarter Chickasaw, she grew up in both cultures, and was especially close to her maternal grandmother, who spoke no English and taught her to do beadwork and to identify herbs and other edible things in nature. She also learned how to break horses, shoot a rifle, and became a member of the women's rifle team at the University of Oklahoma. Mobley initially studied piano as a child before transitioning into voice lessons. Her interest in opera developed in high school. She continued her study of music at the University of Georgia and at Christian College in Columbia, Missouri. She married Louis Brave, an Osage actor, in 1926, divorcing him in 1931. The couple moved to Los Angeles in 1926, and Mobley began to take voice sessions with Emma Loeffler de Zaruba, a former opera singer and chair of the Hollywood Bowl campaign.

In 1929, Mobley auditioned for the Native American Ceremonials at the Hollywood Bowl. She met and was mentored by Muscogee Nation singer Tsianina Redfeather Blackstone. She also met Charles Wakefield Cadman, who helped launch her career. At this time she adopted the name "Lushanya", meaning "songbird", and she was henceforth frequently known as the "Songbird of the Chickasaws". For three summers she starred in the Albuquerque, New Mexico First American Pageant. Invited by a promoter to appear in Germany, she received scholarships to study opera at the Berlin University of the Arts and the Accademia Nazionale di Santa Cecilia in Rome in the early 1930s. In 1935 she appeared in the annual performance of The Song of Hiawatha by Samuel Coleridge-Taylor at the Royal Albert Hall in London, singing the role of Minnehaha. She continued to sing solo roles in Los Angeles and Chicago, notably taking on the title role of Aida with the Chicago Opera Company in Trieste, the first person of Native American descent to perform the part. Another signature piece was Cadman's opera Shanewis. Mobley was the first person of Native American descent to sing at La Scala. She performed at the 1936 Democratic National Convention in Philadelphia. The following year she sang at the coronation of George VI of the United Kingdom. She also traveled abroad to entertain American soldiers during World War II. Mobley later married Ramón Vinay, and retired in order to manage his career. She died in Fort Worth, and is buried in her hometown of Ardmore.

As Lushanya Vinay, Mobley was inducted into the Oklahoma Hall of Fame in 1964. She was inducted into the Chickasaw Nation Hall of Fame in 2009, an honor accepted in her stead by her niece, Aurelia Guy Phillips.
