= Hamm's Brewery =

American brewing company

Coordinates: 44°57′45″N 93°4′17″W

Theo. Hamm Brewing Co.
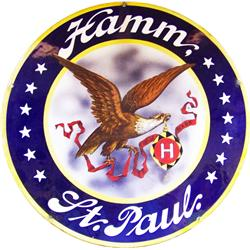
- Industry: Alcoholic beverage
- Predecessor: Andrew F. Keller, Excelsior Brewery
- Founded: 1865; 161 years ago
- Founder: Theodore Hamm
- Defunct: 1997; 29 years ago
- Successor: Olympia Brewing Co.; Stroh Brewing Company; Miller Brewing Company; Molson Coors
- Headquarters: Saint Paul, Minnesota, U.S.
- Products: Beer: special light no longer in production
- Owner: Molson Coors
- Website: hamms.com

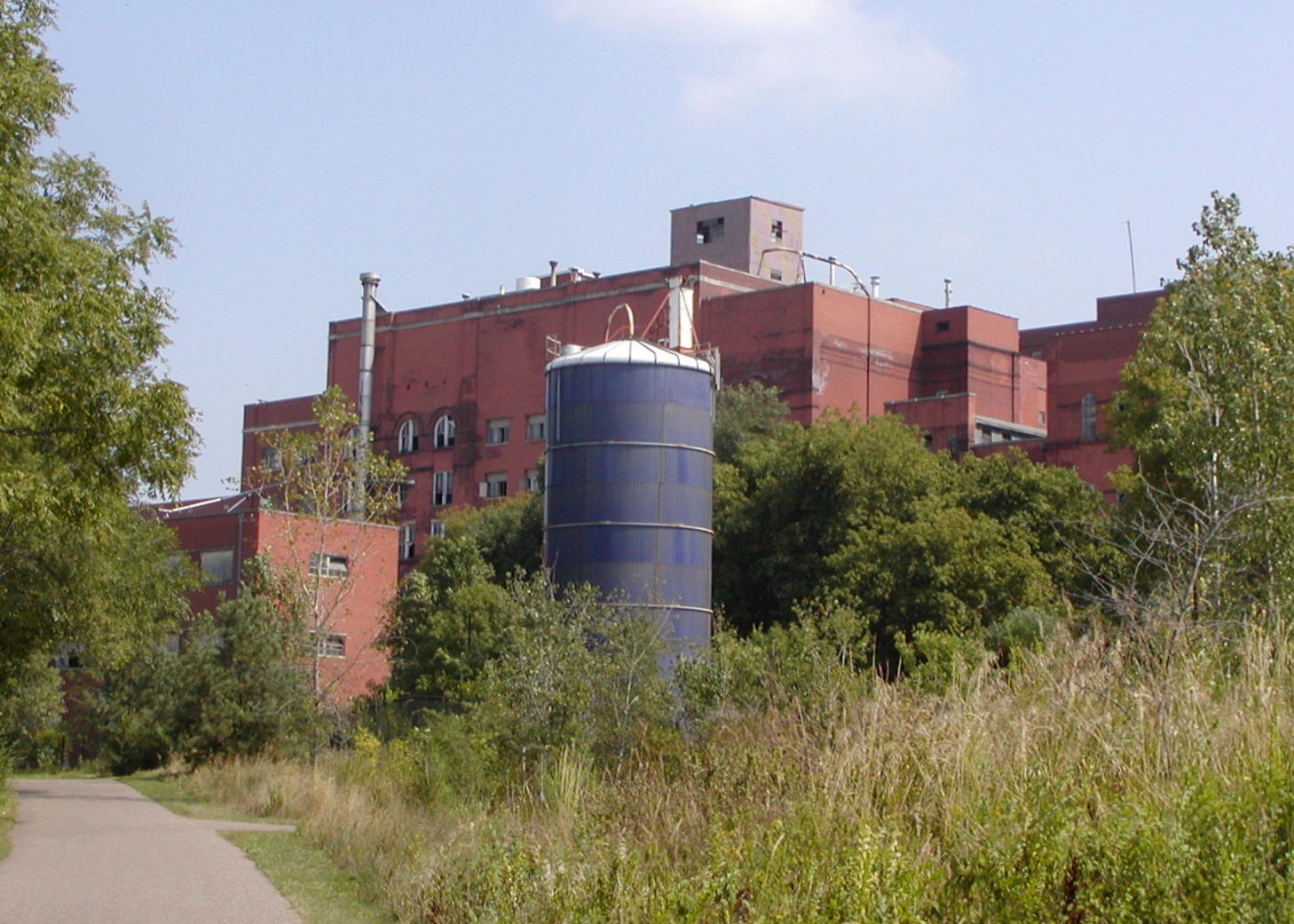
Brewery overlooks Swede Hollow in Saint Paul

Theodore Hamm's Brewing Company was an American brewing company established in 1865 in Saint Paul, Minnesota. Becoming the fifth largest brewery in the United States, Hamm's expanded with additional breweries that were acquired in other cities, including San Francisco, Los Angeles, Houston, and Baltimore.

== History ==
=== 19th century ===
The Theodore Hamm Brewing Company was established in 1865 when German immigrant Theodore Hamm (1825–1903) acquired it in default of a loan issued to Andrew F. Keller. Keller had in 1858 established the Pittsburgh Brewery over artesian wells in a section of the Phalen Creek valley in St. Paul. As the brewery grew, Keller procured a loan from tavern owner and customer Theodore Hamm to expand the brewery. The loan was secured with the deed of the brewery. Costs ran ahead of sales, and in 1864 Hamm took over the business in default and renamed it Theo. Hamm's Excelsior Brewery. Keller retired and became a saloon operator; he died on February 19, 1873.

Hamm, a butcher by trade and local saloon owner, first hired Jacob Schmidt as a brewmaster. Schmidt remained with the company until the early 1880s, becoming a close family friend of the Hamms. Schmidt left the company after an argument over Louise Hamm's disciplinary actions regarding Schmidt's daughter, Marie. By 1884, Schmidt was a partner at the North Star Brewery not far from Hamm's brewery. By 1899, he had established his own brewery on the site of the former Stalhmann Brewery site. In need of a new brewmaster, Hamm hired Christopher Figge, who started a tradition of three generations of Hamm's brewmasters, with his son William and grandson William II eventually serving in the position. By the 1880s, the Theodore Hamm Brewing Company was reportedly the second largest in Minnesota.

=== 20th century ===
During Prohibition, the company survived by producing soft drinks and other food products, enabling it to expand rapidly through acquisitions after the repeal of Prohibition in 1933. From 1933 until 1965, Hamm's saw much success, becoming the fifth largest brewery in the nation by the 1950s; much of this can be attributed to William C. Figge Jr. taking over as president in 1951. Figge expanded the Hamm's brand into a national entity with breweries in Saint Paul, Los Angeles, San Francisco, Baltimore, and Houston. The latter two were short-lived and closed soon after they opened. As the company celebrated its 100th anniversary, the family sold the brewery and left the brewing industry to focus on its real estate ventures.

In 1965, the company was acquired by Heublein. In 1973, Hamm's was sold to a group of Hamm's distributors which in turn sold it to the Olympia Brewing Company in 1975. In 1983, Pabst purchased Olympia—along with Hamm's. It was at this time that the Saint Paul flagship brewery was traded to the Stroh Brewing Company; Stroh's continued to operate the brewery until 1997. When it closed, the operation ended a 137-year brewing tradition on the site. Its buildings were shuttered, and subsequently vandalized, demolished, or left to decay. Miller Brewing acquired the brand from Pabst in 1999.

=== 21st century ===
Miller was later purchased by South African Breweries and the name was changed to SABMiller. Subsequently, SABMiller formed a joint venture combining their US and Puerto Rican assets with those of Molson Coors to form MillerCoors. In 2016, SABMiller sold its interests in MillerCoors to Molson Coors, who had been its partner in the joint venture, for around $12 billion. Molson Coors gained full ownership of the Miller brand portfolio outside of the US and Puerto Rico, and retained the rights to all of the brands that were in the MillerCoors portfolio for the US and Puerto Rico. Molson Coors now produces Hamm's beers: Premium and Golden Draft.

== Breweries ==
=== Saint Paul ===
The flagship brewery of the former Hamm's empire was in Saint Paul. Brewing began on the site in 1860, when Andrew F. Keller established the Pittsburgh Excelsior Brewery. Keller, a friend of Theodore Hamm, planned for the two of them to travel to California for the "second gold rush." Louise Hamm forbade her husband to leave her alone with three children in the wild frontier town of Saint Paul. Unbeknown to his wife, Hamm had staked all of his savings and mortgaged his beer garden to support Keller's trip and property acquisition in California. As collateral, Keller gave the deed to his small brewery and flour mill, located on the east side of Saint Paul, to Hamm.

Upon Keller's death in 1865, all of Hamm's savings, homestead and stake were lost. Having lost his beer garden, Hamm moved his family into the brewery.

Through constant expansion and improvements, the brewery soon became the largest in the state. The most notable expansion was the state-of-the-art brew house, which was built in 1893. In 1897, the wash house and part of the bottling plant were built, both of which still stand. The brewery was in an almost constant state of expansion from 1933 until 1948. They added a new power house, bottling facilities, malt house, grain storage, stock houses, shipping docks, office space, garages, and more.

The brewery shut its doors in 1997 under the ownership of the Stroh Brewing Company. The property was sold to a real estate investor who in turn sold the southern half to the City of Saint Paul, including the original brew house. The city left these buildings to decay and crumble. The northern portion of the brewery today is mostly inhabited by various businesses, including a trapeze school.

In December 2022, the City of Saint Paul announced it had tentatively selected JB Vang Partners, Inc. to redevelop the former Hamm's Brewery Complex, the plans for which include affordable and market-rate housing, commercial space, a public plaza, and more.

=== San Francisco ===
In 1953, Hamm's purchased its second brewery from the Rainier Brewing Company. Hamm's opened its San Francisco brewery in 1954 at 1550 Bryant Street. Its 20-by-80 foot sign, was surmounted by a three-dimensional 13-foot beer-glass-shaped lighting sculpture on top, filling with "beer" and forming a "head", all with lights. It appeared in the first Dirty Harry film and was a local landmark. The brewery closed in 1972. In the early 1980s, Suicide Club (secret society) used a jackhammer to "take out the doors and open holes in the giant tanks and make living spaces", the beer vats were then first squatted and then rented out to punk rock bands. Known as "The Vats", the brewery was a center of San Francisco punk rock culture with about 200 bands using individual vats as music studios. The building was renovated in the mid 1980s and converted into offices and showroom space.

=== Los Angeles ===
In 1957, Hamm's purchased the former Acme Brewery on 49th street in Los Angeles, California. The brewery had been owned by the New York–based Rheingold Beer / Liebmann Breweries since 1954. The brewery was operated by Hamm's until 1972.

=== Baltimore ===
In 1959, the Gunther Brewery of Baltimore, Maryland, was purchased. The decision to discontinue the Gunther brand turned much of the Baltimore population against Hamm's. The brewery's reputation was further tarnished by a frozen batch of beer that made its way to market. After a failed attempt to re-introduce the Gunther brand in 1963, the brewery was sold to the Schaefer Brewing Company of New York after only four years of operation.

=== Houston ===
A final attempt at expansion was made in 1963 with the purchase of the Gulf Brewing Company of Houston, Texas. The brewery had been founded in 1933 by Howard Hughes. This venture was more successful, but in 1967 the brewery suffered a fire. Heublein decided not to rebuild and sold off the property. The closing of the Houston brewery in 1967 marked the beginning of the end for Hamm's bid to be a national brand. The breweries in San Francisco and Los Angeles were closed in the early 1970s.

== Products ==
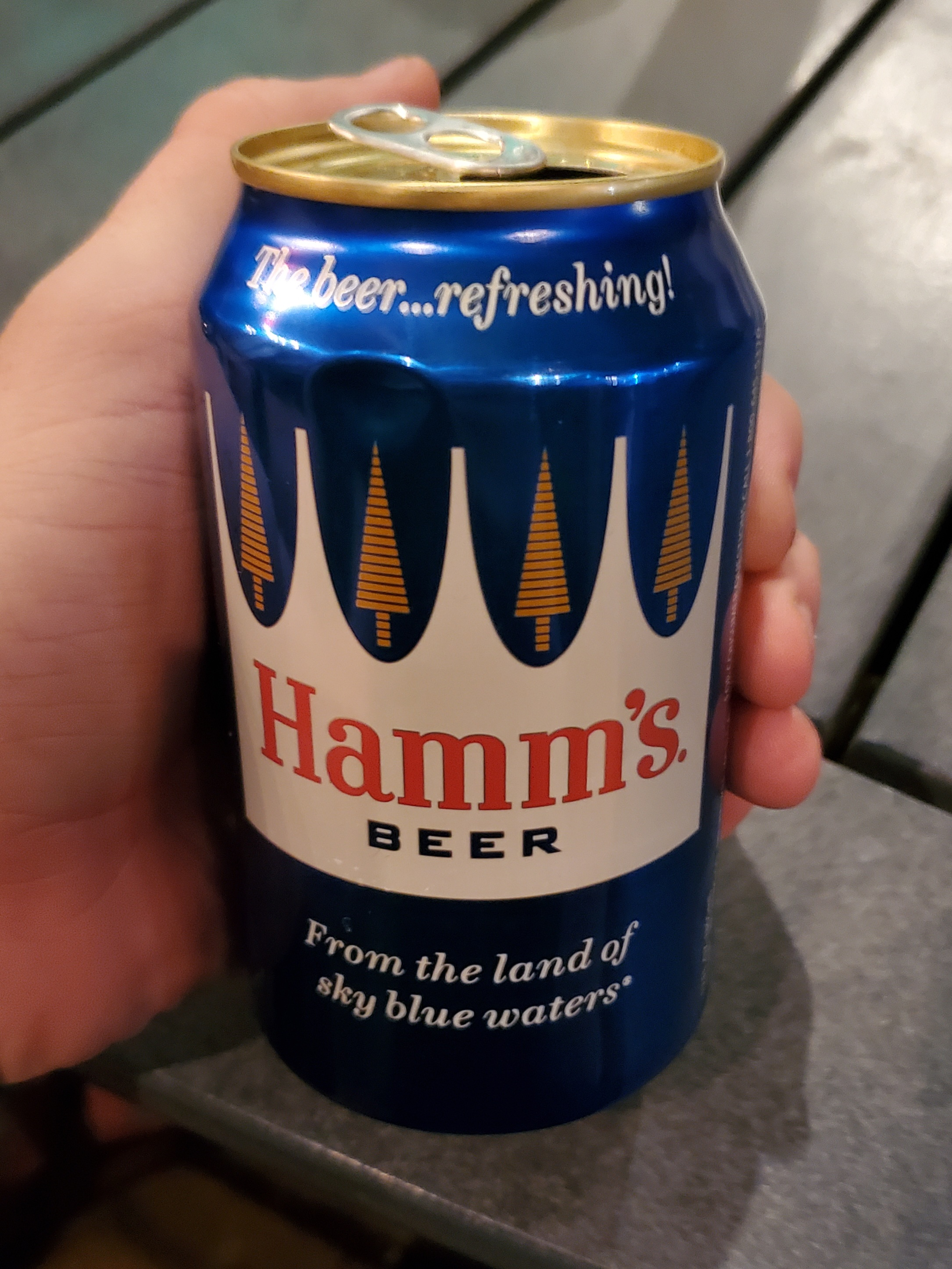
A can of Hamm's, sold in 2022

While Hamm's is no longer an independent brewing company, it is still sold in select markets under the Hamm's brand and label. The beer is brewed and sold by Molson Coors North America. Several Hamm's beers have been produced by Molson Coors: Hamm's Premium, the original pale lager; Hamm's Golden Draft; and Hamm's Special Light.

In August 2021, MolsonCoors announced it was discontinuing Hamm's Special Light as part of a "streamlining" effort by the company.

== Advertising ==
Hamm's was well known for its advertising jingle and its mascot, the Hamm's Beer bear.

=== Jingle ===
The original jingle, with lyrics by Nelle Richmond Eberhart and music by Charles Wakefield Cadman was derived from a 1909 art song entitled "From The Land of Sky-Blue Water". It was first used on radio and later on television. It started with tom-tom drums, then a chorus intoned (partial lyrics):

From the Land of Sky Blue Waters [(echo) Waters]
Comes the water best for brewing,
Hamm's, the beer refreshing,
Hamm's, the beer refreshing,
Hamm's!

Alternative wording on radio and TV adverts (circa 1950s):

From, the Land of Sky Blue Waters – Hamm's Beer,
From the land of pines, lofty balsams,
Comes the beer refreshing,
Hamm's, the beer refreshing,
Hamm's!

=== Hamm's Bear ===
The Hamm's Beer bear (or the Hamm's Bear) was a cartoon mascot used in television production and print advertisements for the beer. The animated character was the first of its kind in the beer industry. In a typical TV spot, the bear would dance around in a pastoral setting while the "Land of Sky Blue Waters" advertising jingle played in the background. In 1999, Advertising Age Magazine called the Hamm's Bear the key element of one of the best ad campaigns in the last 100 years. A statue of the mascot was erected in a St. Paul, Minnesota in 2005.

==== Creation ====
Most agree that the character was born in 1952 at Freddie's restaurant in Minneapolis at a meeting with Cleo Hovel, creative director for Campbell-Mithun, and Howard Swift, an animator who worked for the California TV production company Swift-Chaplin. Hovel usually gets the credit for drawing the bear on a napkin in response to the idea to add an animal character to the Sky Blue Waters campaign.

The Hamm's ads were the first to use an animated character for a beer, although the perpetually mute character eventually only learned to speak one line: "It bears repeating!". The Hamm's Bear was created by Patrick DesJarlait following an idea first sketched on a restaurant napkin in 1952. The resultant advertising campaign—launched in 1953—was produced by the Campbell Mithun Advertising Agency. The original idea for the mascot came from Cleo Hoval, an account representative with Campbell Mithun, who finally asked a business acquaintance, Ray Tollefson, to draw the bear after discarding other prior attempts by his own marketing co-workers. Cleo liked the bear that Ray drew. Tollefson eventually drew many scenes and humorous situations into which he could put the bear in the ongoing Hamm's advertising campaign. He also created an in-house book for Campbell Mithun, "How to Draw the Hamm's Bear," since so many agency artists would have to be able to draw the Hamm's Bear accurately. Larry LaBelle, Vice President, Director to Television Production at Campbell-Mithun, could draw the bear accurately and conceptualized many of the commercials. LaBelle also created and designed the "Little Flame Girl" for Minnegasco and Tollefson provided the finished art following LaBelle's design and instructions. LaBelle also created the concept of Albert & Stanley for Grain Belt Beer while the pair collaborated on the finished character designs.

==== Use and public acceptance ====
The Hamm's Bear was featured on an endless array of signs, glassware, and promotional merchandise. Commercials featuring the klutzy cartoon bear with a bewildered but cheerful grin—often pictured in television ads tripping over canoes, logs, or its own feet—were considered an overwhelming success.

Although they were silly, the commercials were well written. The commercials were smarter and funnier than most non-advertising cartoons of the time. Each spot held genuine entertainment value for viewers (and had a miniature story-line containing a plot, some form of conflict, and usually a final resolution), guaranteeing TV audiences would pay attention. Also, the background use of actual imagery from Minnesota's natural wilderness helped get across the product's emphasis on natural and pure ingredients much more effectively than mere advertising copy could. The founder of Campbell Mithun, the ad agency that created the Hamm's Bear, once said, "We believe the legend of the Hamm's bear, like that of Paul Bunyan, will grow greater and greater as time goes on."

Hamm's went on to become one of the first companies to create a national pro-sports and college-sports branding campaign. According to Moira F. Harris' book, The Paws of Refreshment: The Story of Hamm's Beer Advertising, Hamm's claimed to be the biggest TV and sports radio beer sponsor in the country by 1964. The Hamm's Bear ads were run in support not only of the Minnesota Twins and Vikings; but also of the Chicago Blackhawks, White Sox, Cubs and Bears; the Kansas City A's; San Francisco Giants and 49ers; the Los Angeles Rams; Houston Oilers; Baltimore Orioles; Green Bay Packers; and Dallas Cowboys.

The Audit Research Bureau reported that nationwide, in 1965, the Hamm's Bear mascot was the "best liked" advertisement. Considering that Hamm's commercials only aired in 31 states, this is quite an accomplishment. The Hamm's Bear mascot was the key element of the campaign which ranked 75th in the "Best Ad Campaign of the 20th Century" as named by Advertising Age Magazine in 1999. The character was so well known (and identified so closely with the state of Minnesota) that in 2000, the St. Paul Pioneer Press named the Hamm's Bear as one of the "150 Most Influential Minnesotans of the Past 150 Years".

By that time, however, the current parent company, Miller Brewing, had drastically reduced the bear's use due to concerns it might be interpreted as an attempt to market beer to children (just as R.J. Reynolds Tobacco had recently been forced to discontinue its Joe Camel character for similar reasons).

=== Legacy ===
In 2002, to commemorate the bear's 50th anniversary, a St. Paul–based group of Hamm's memorabilia collectors, the Hamm's Club, proposed erecting a six-foot granite statue of the bear near a waterfall named for William Hamm (a former company president), which is in Como Park. The statue was placed instead in the Seventh Street Mall in September 2005.

== In popular culture ==
William Hamm Jr. was kidnapped in Saint Paul by the Barker-Karpis Gang in the 1930s. The subsequent investigation by the FBI employed the first attempt at raising latent fingerprints from paper ransom notes.

A portion of the Hamm's Beer jingle was sung by The Three Stooges, Moe Howard, Larry Fine and Joe DeRita in the 1962 film, The Three Stooges in Orbit.

In the David Frizzell song "I'm Gonna Hire a Wino to Decorate Our Home", the wife mentions the Hamm's Bear in the lyrics, referring to a Hamm's Bear clock, used in many bars, i.e.: "When the Hamm's Bear says it's closing time, you won't have far to crawl".

In Episode 10/20 of M*A*S*H, "Sons and Bowlers," B.J. Hunnicutt, engaged in a scam to trick a professional bowler into believing he has kidney problems that cause his urine to turn blue, hears the bowler screaming in the latrine and quotes from the Hamm's jingle in an aside to Charles Emerson Winchester III, "From the land of sky-blue waters ..." . Actor Mike Farrell, who played B.J., appeared in a Hamm's commercial where the bear showed him how to make the beer magically appear.

A Hamm's delivery truck is clearly seen briefly in the 1967 film, The Graduate (at approximately 1:15:44).

In the 1974 film A Woman Under the Influence, the character played by Peter Falk shares a Hamm’s beer with his children in the back of a truck.

In the episode titled Marco (Better Call Saul), aired 2015, Bob Odenkirk's character Jimmy McGill is shown drinking a Hamm's beer.

In episode 7 of Stick, aired 2025, characters are seen drinking Hamm’s beer.

The Chugs, a punk band from Evansville, have made Hamm's beer the central theme for the entirety of their musical catalog. Since their inception in 2023, they've released three "six packs" of songs dedicated to "the beer...refreshing."
