= Go West (1940 film) =

1940 Marx Brothers film by Edward Buzzell

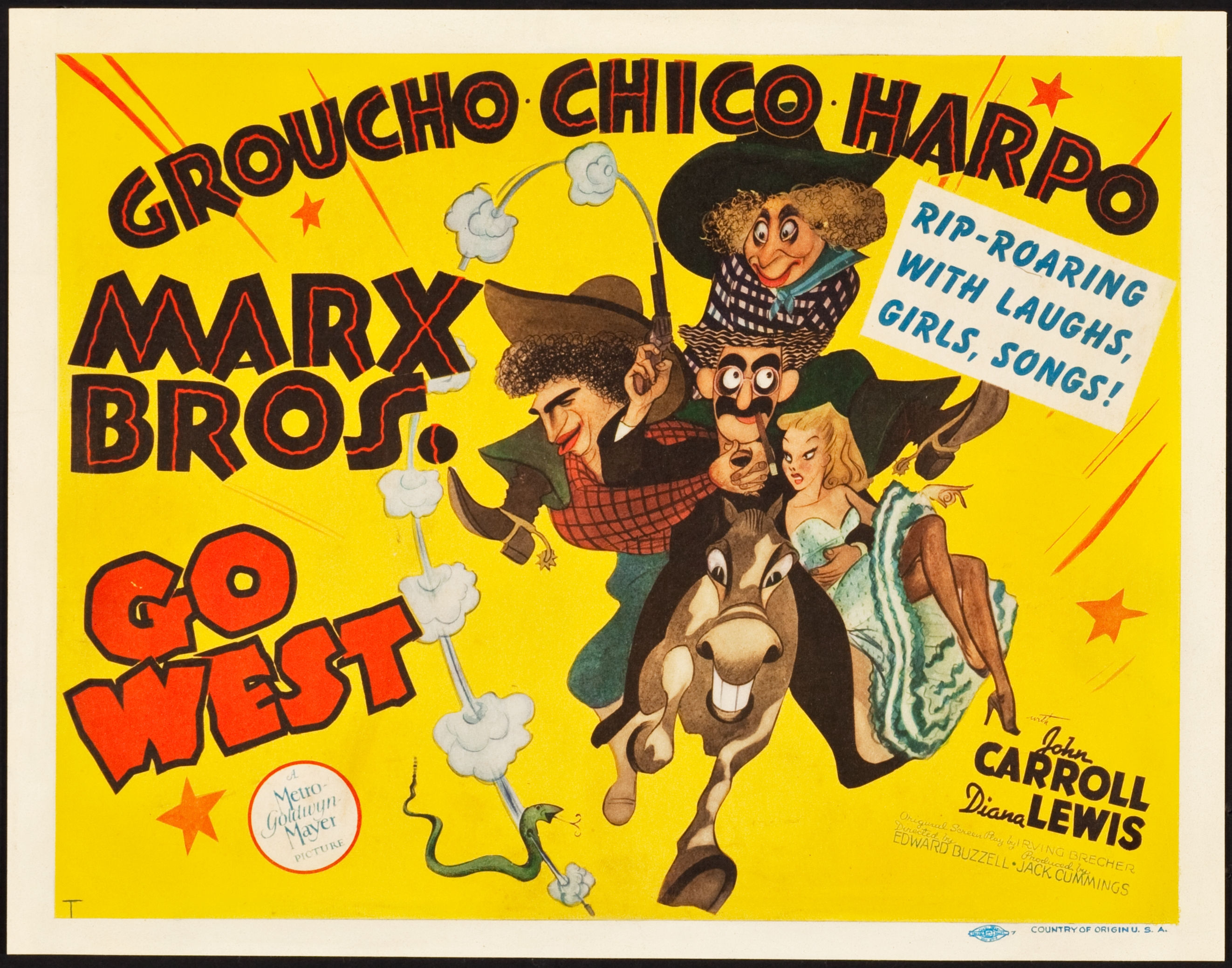
- Theatrical release poster.
- Directed by: Edward Buzzell
- Written by: Irving Brecher; Nat Perrin (uncredited)
- Produced by: Jack Cummings
- Starring: Groucho Marx; Harpo Marx; Chico Marx; John Carroll; Diana Lewis
- Cinematography: Leonard Smith
- Edited by: Blanche Sewell
- Music by: George Bassman (orchestrations); Georgie Stoll (music direction)
- Production company: Metro-Goldwyn Mayer
- Distributed by: Loew's Inc.
- Release date: December 6, 1940
- Running time: 80 minutes
- Country: United States
- Language: English

Go West is a 1940 American comedy Western film from Metro-Goldwyn-Mayer starring the Marx Bros. In their tenth film, (Groucho, Harpo, and Chico) head to the American West and attempt to unite a couple by ensuring that a stolen property deed is retrieved. The film was directed by Edward Buzzell and written by Irving Brecher.

The film also features actors John Carroll and Diana Lewis as the love interests and actress and singer June MacCloy.

== Plot ==
Confidence man S. Quentin Quale is heading west to seek his fortune, but is short ten dollars for a train ticket. In the railroad station, he encounters brothers Joseph and Rusty Panello and attempts to swindle them, but the Panellos are also con men and swindle Quale instead. The Panellos are friends with an old prospector named Dan Wilson whose near-worthless property, Dead Man's Gulch, has no gold.

The Panellos loan Wilson their last ten dollars for a grubstake and he insists on giving them the deed to the Gulch as collateral. Unbeknownst to Wilson, Terry Turner, the son of his longtime rival and beau to his granddaughter Eve, has travelled to New York in order to persuade the Railroad to purchase Dead Man's Gulch from Dan Wilson.

Terry convinces the railway officials that the gulch is the only practical route through the mountains to the west. They agree to buy the property, thus making the deed holder wealthy. After Quale attempts to swindle the Panellos out of the deed, crooked railroad executive John Beecher and shady saloon owner "Red" Baxter steal the deed from Quale. Quale and the Panello brothers help Terry and Eve retrieve the deed and deliver it to the railroad officials in New York.

== Cast ==
- Groucho Marx as S. Quentin Quale
- Chico Marx as Joe Panello
- Harpo Marx as "Rusty" Panello
- John Carroll as Terry Turner
- Diana Lewis as Eve Wilson
- Walter Woolf King as John Beecher
- Robert Barrat as "Red" Baxter
- June MacCloy as Lulubelle
- George Lessey as Railroad President

Uncredited Cast

- Tully Marshall as Dan Wilson
- Iris Adrian as Mary Lou
- Joan Woodbury as Melody
- Joe Yule as Crystal Palace Bartender Joe
- Mitchell Lewis as Halfbreed Indian Pete
- Arthur Housman as Drunk In Saloon
- Frederick Burton as Johnson

== Production ==
Like all other Marx Brothers MGM films, Go West has several musical numbers, including "You Can't Argue with Love" by Bronislau Kaper and Gus Kahn, "Ridin' the Range" by Roger Edens and Gus Kahn, "From the Land of the Sky-Blue Water" by Charles Wakefield Cadman and "The Woodpecker Song" by Harold Adamson and Eldo Di Lazzaro . In this song, Chico, playing the piano, rolls an orange on the keys in sync with the melody.

As with A Night at the Opera and A Day at the Races, the Marxes played key comedy scenes from Go West live onstage on a pre-filming tour; this tour was much shorter than that for the first two films, lasting three weeks.

Groucho was aged 49 during the filming of Go West, and his hairline had begun receding. As such, he took to wearing a toupee again throughout the film, as he did in the previous film, At the Circus.

Some of the exterior railroad scenes were filmed on the Sierra Railroad in Tuolumne County, California.

== Musical numbers ==
- "You Can't Argue With Love"
- "From the Land of the Sky-Blue Water"
- "Ridin' The Range"

== Reception ==
Thomas M. Pryor of The New York Times called the film "an unevenly paced show" with "only one really funny sequence," referring to the train climax. Variety wrote, "The three Marx Bros. ride a merry trail of laughs and broad burlesque in a speedy adventure through the sagebrush country," adding that the film had "many fresh situations for the Marxian antics."

Harrison's Reports wrote that it was "much better than their last two pictures" and that the final twenty minutes "should thrill as well as amuse spectators." Film Daily called it "wildly funny in places, amusing for the most part and dead in one or two spots that a little editing could improve." John Mosher of The New Yorker wrote, "Possibly not the most strenuous Marxian product that we have seen, the picture nevertheless is very satisfactory and quite lunatic enough."

A theatrical poster for Go West can be seen on the cover of Elton John's 1973 album Don't Shoot Me I'm Only the Piano Player as a homage to Groucho.
