= Marie Sundelius =

American opera singer (1884–1958)

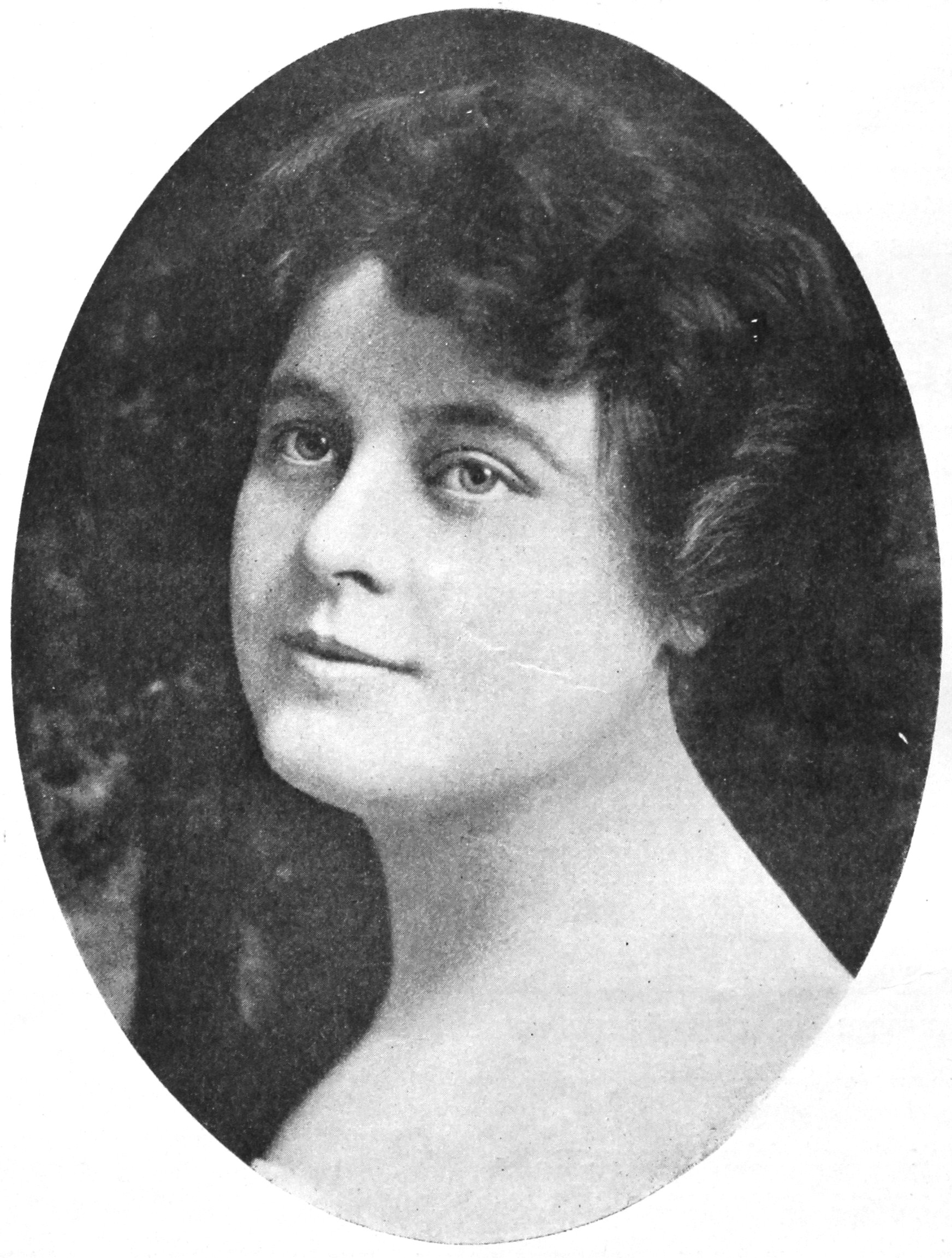

Background information
- Occupation: soprano

Marie Sundelius (born Marie Sundborg; 4 February 1882 – 27 June 1958) was a Swedish-American classical soprano. She sang for many years with the Metropolitan Opera in New York City and later embarked on a second career as a celebrated voice teacher in Boston.

== Early life and education ==
Born Marie Sundborg in Karlstad, Sweden, Sundelius moved to the United States at the age of nine, ultimately settling in Boston with her family in 1894. She graduated from The Dearborn School in 1897. She began to study music first with Frederick Bristol and later Enrica Clay Dillon. She also had coaching lessons with Swedish composer, Wilhelm Peterson-Berger in Stockholm, and French lyric tenor Edmond Clément in Paris. She married Gustaf Sundelius, a Swedish born businessman, in Boston in 1906.

== Career ==
Sundelius began performing professionally in concerts and oratorios in Boston in 1910, making her debut performance under the baton of Karl Muck. In December 1915 she came to New York City for the first time to sing as a soloist in the world premiere of Marco Enrico Bossi's Jeanne d'Arc with the Oratorio Society of New York. The performance was attended by Giulio Gatti-Casazza, the General Manager of the Metropolitan Opera, who immediately approached her afterwards with an offer to join the roster of singers at the Met. She accepted, and made her opera debut at the "Old Met" on November 25, 1916 as the First Priestess in Christoph Willibald Gluck's Iphigénie en Tauride with Melanie Kurt in the title role and Artur Bodanzky conducting.

Sundelius remained committed to the Metropolitan Opera up through 1923, although she returned to the house periodically as a guest artist up through 1928. Her roles at the house included Anna in Loreley, the Artichoke Vendor in Louise, the Cat in L'oiseau bleu, the Celestial Voice in Don Carlo, Diane in Iphigénie en Tauride, Elvira in L'italiana in Algeri, a Flower Maiden in Parsifal, Gerhilde, Gutrune, and Helmwige in The Ring Cycle, Inès in L'Africaine, Jemmy in William Tell, the Mermaid in Oberon, Micaela in Carmen, Musetta in La bohème, Nedda in Pagliaci, Pomone in La reine Fiammette, Samaritana in Riccardo Zandonai's Francesca da Rimini, Sophie in Der Rosenkavalier, the Voice of a Priestess in Aida, and the title role in The Golden Cockerel. She also created roles in several world premieres at the Met, including Johanna in Reginald De Koven's The Canterbury Pilgrims (1917), Amy Everton in Charles Wakefield Cadman's Shanewis (1918), the Monitress in Suor Angelica (1918), and Ciesca in Gianni Schicchi (1918). Her last performance in a staged opera at the Met was as Marguerite in Faust on April 1, 1925 with Edward Johnson in the title role. She returned a few more times to the Met for concert performances, making her final and 248th appearance at the house on March 11, 1928.

While at the Met, Sundelius occasionally toured the United States in productions with the Scotti Opera Company. After she left New York in 1925, she went to Europe where she was committed to the Royal Swedish Opera in Stockholm through 1927. She also toured Europe, performing in concerts and recitals. In 1929-1930 she sang with the Philadelphia Civic Opera Company and the Chicago Civic Opera.

== Later years ==
She retired from the stage in the early 1930s, after which she taught for many years at the New England Conservatory. Among her notable pupils were Jean Cox, Mildred Miller, and Coretta Scott King. She died in Boston at the age of 74. Her voice is preserved on several recordings made on the Columbia, Vocalion and Edison record labels during the second decade of the 20th century.

== Gustaf Sundelius ==
Gustaf Sundelius was born in Sweden, where he attended Uppsala University. He came to the United States in 1900 settling in Boston. After a business career, he became executive secretary of The Swedish-American Chamber of Commerce in 1920. In 1926, he was appointed editor of Nordstjernan, a Swedish-language weekly published in New York City. He was later attached to the Swedish Vice Consulate in Boston.

== Other sources ==
- Scandinavian Review, Volume 12 (American-Scandinavian Foundation, Page 740)
