= William Hamm Jr. =

American brewery executive (1893–1970)

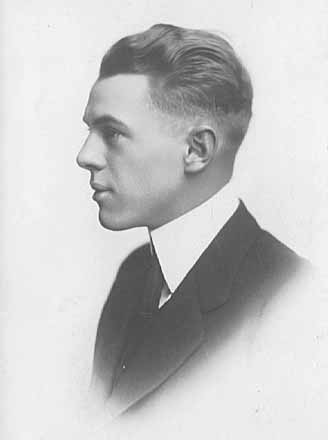
- Hamm c. 1915
- Born: September 4, 1893; Saint Paul, Minnesota, US
- Died: August 20, 1970 (aged 76); Minneapolis, Minnesota, US
- Occupation: President/chairman of Hamm's Brewery
- Known for: Being kidnapped by the Barker–Karpis Gang
- Spouses: Dorothy Heywood (m. 1927; div. 1930); Marie Hersey Carroll (m. 1934)
- Children: 2
- Relatives: Theodore Hamm (grandfather)

William Hamm Jr. (September 4, 1893 – August 20, 1970) was an executive of Hamm's Brewery. In 1933, he was kidnapped by the Barker–Karpis Gang and held for a $100,000 ransom.

== Early life ==
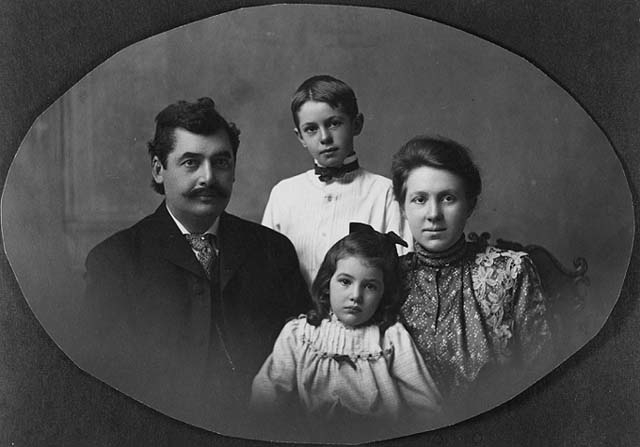
A young William Jr. with his parents and sister

William Hamm Jr. was born in Saint Paul, Minnesota, on September 4, 1893, to William and Marie Hamm. The grandson of Theodore Hamm, the founder of Hamm's Brewery, he earned a Bachelor of Arts degree from the University of Minnesota in 1915. After briefly working for his family's brewing company, he enlisted in the United States Army in 1918 and eventually became a 2nd Lieutenant.

== Career ==
Upon returning from World War I, Hamm began working for Hamm's Brewery. He became the president of the company in 1931. He also became president of the Emporium department store in Saint Paul. Both businesses prospered under his leadership.

=== Kidnapping ===
Shortly after noon on June 15, 1933, Hamm was leaving the brewery to get lunch when he was accosted by four men. He was shoved into a waiting car and taken to Wisconsin, where he was coerced to sign four ransom notes. From there, the gang took him to Bensenville, Illinois. That evening, the family received a phone call saying that Hamm had been kidnapped and instructions would follow later. At 2 a.m. on June 16, a man initially believed to be gangster Verne Sankey gave a taxi driver in Saint Paul a ransom note with instructions to deliver it to William Dunn, the manager of Hamm's Brewery. The note demanded a ransom of $100,000 ($2.43 million in 2024). (Note: Mr. William Dunn — You have evidently verified our statement (by telephone) of this afternoon. In other words, you know your boy friend is out of circulation. Our other statements also will be verified before we are through. You are to pay off one hundred thousand dollars in the manner explained to you this afternoon. You are to keep this matter quiet until such time as all arrangements are completed and Hamm is released. You are to wait final instructions tomorrow. You are to have the money ready as per instructions you take your own chances. Furthermore, if you fail to comply with our demands you will never see Hamm Jr. again. In Mr. Hamm's writing: I hereby authorize the above payment to be made and request that all instructions be fully carried out. William Hamm Jr.) The Hamm family paid the ransom on the night of June 17, though less than the $100,000 that had been demanded, by kicking it out of a car between Pine City and Rush City.

On June 19, Hamm was released at 5:30 a.m. by a farmhouse near Wyoming, Minnesota.

The Federal Bureau of Investigation launched an investigation into the kidnapping and, using latent fingerprint identification, connected fingerprints on the ransom notes to members of the Barker–Karpis Gang — specifically, Alvin Karpis, "Doc" Barker, and Charles Fitzgerald. This was the first time that silver nitrate was successfully used in forensic science to identify fingerprints from objects that could not be dusted for prints. On May 1, 1936, Alvin Karpis was arrested by J. Edgar Hoover in New Orleans. He was brought back to Saint Paul where he pled guilty and was sentenced to life in prison.

=== Post-kidnapping ===
Hamm became chairman of the board of Hamm's in 1952. Hamm also served on the board of directors of First National Bank of Saint Paul and the United States Brewers' Association. In August 1952, Hamm and his siblings established the Hamm Foundation, a non-profit focused on the donations for "charitable, scientific, and educational purposes". He retired from Hamm's in May 1966 and was bestowed the title of honorary chairman.

Hamm died of cancer on August 20, 1970, at the age of 76 at Northwestern Hospital in Minneapolis.

== Personal life ==
Hamm married Dorothy Heywood on October 1, 1927. Dorothy filed for divorce in 1930, stating that he had abandoned her. Hamm married Marie Hersey Carroll on January 1, 1934. They had two sons, William and Edward. In his retirement, he lived in Orono, Minnesota.
