= Constance Eberhart =

American singer

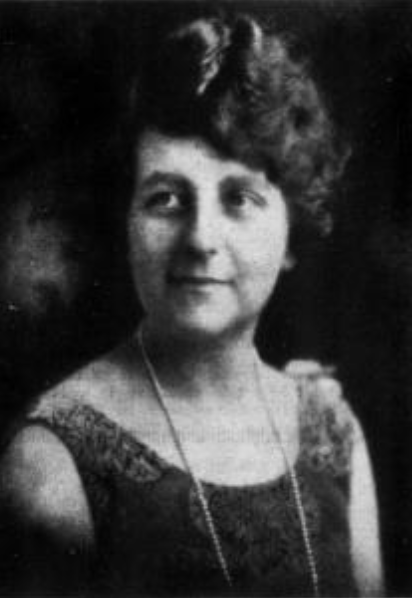
- Constance Eberhart, from a 1927 publication
- Born: Constance Richmond Eberhart; April 15, 1897; York, Nebraska, U.S.
- Died: March 1981 (aged 83)
- Occupations: Singer, music teacher
- Parent: Nelle Richmond Eberhart
- Relatives: Mignon G. Eberhart (cousin's wife)

Constance Richmond Eberhart (April 15, 1897 – March 1981) was an American singer and music teacher. She sang with the Cincinnati Grand Opera Company and the Chicago Civic Opera Company.

== Early life and education ==
Eberhart was born on a farm in York, Nebraska, and raised near Pittsburgh, the daughter of Oscar Eberhart and Nelle Richmond Eberhart. Her mother was a noted librettist. She studied voice with Oscar Saenger, Yvonne de Tréville, and others.

== Career ==
Eberhart was a mezzo-soprano, and sometimes contralto, who sang with the Cincinnati Grand Opera Company and the Chicago Civic Opera Company. She also sang with the Papalardo Opera Ensemble in 1924, and with the Cincinnati Zoo Opera annually, from 1927 to 1932. She made her Chicago opera debut in 1927, in Falstaff. As a concert singer, she was especially known for singing the works of her mother's collaborator, composer Charles Wakefield Cadman, sometimes in costume. "She has depth and richness of quality in her low tones," reported the Musical Courier in 1926, "while her high register is brilliant and free."

In her later years, Eberhart was a voice teacher in Chicago schools, at a summer arts colony in Arkansas, and at a conservatory in Kansas City. She directed the FMC Lyric Opera Workshop as a summer program in Arkansas in the 1950s, and donated a lodge to the program, in her mother's memory. She was active in the National Opera Association.

== Personal life and legacy ==
Eberhart died in 1981, at the age of 83. Scrapbooks of memorabilia from her music career are in a collection of her mother's papers at Middlebury College. In 1983 a biography, Constance Eberhart: A Musical Career in the Age of Cadman was published by the American Opera Association. The Constance Eberhart Memorial Endowment of the National Opera Association funds scholarship awards for vocal music students.
