= Tsianina Redfeather Blackstone =

American Muscogee singer (1882–1985)

Tsianina Redfeather
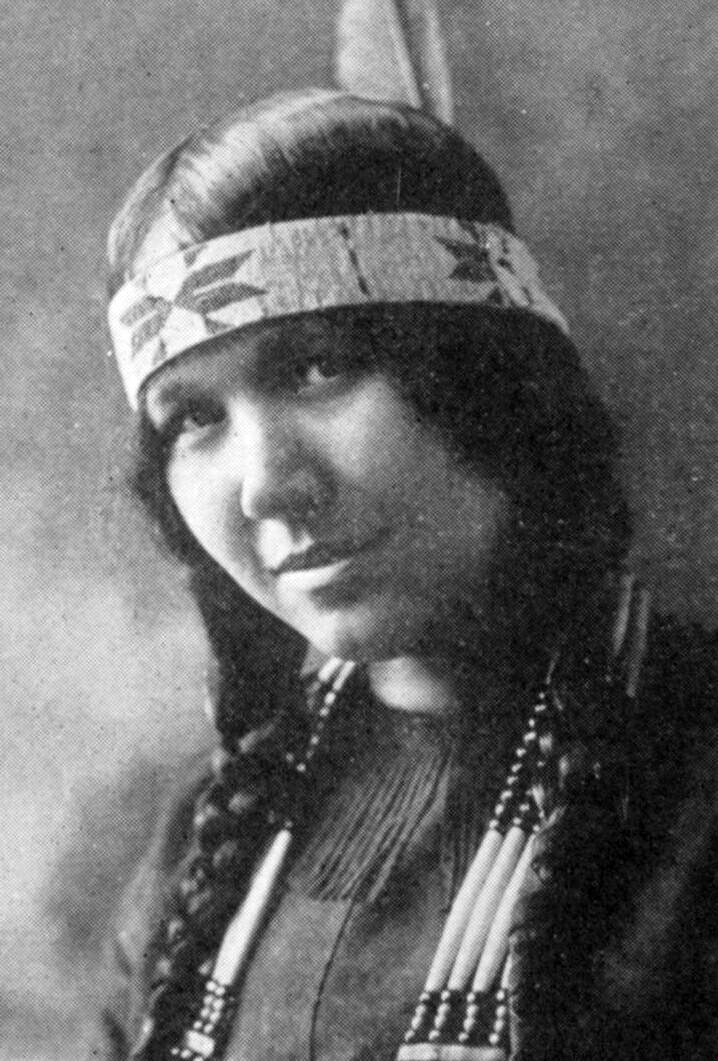
- Tsianina Redfeather c. 1915
- Born: December 13, 1882; Eufaula, Muscogee Nation
- Died: January 10, 1985 (aged 102); San Diego, California
- Other names: Tsianina Blackstone, Tsianina Grayson, Princess Tsianina Redfeather, Florence Tsianina Evans
- Citizenship: Muscogee Nation, American
- Occupations: opera singer and activist
- Notable work: Libretto for Shanewis

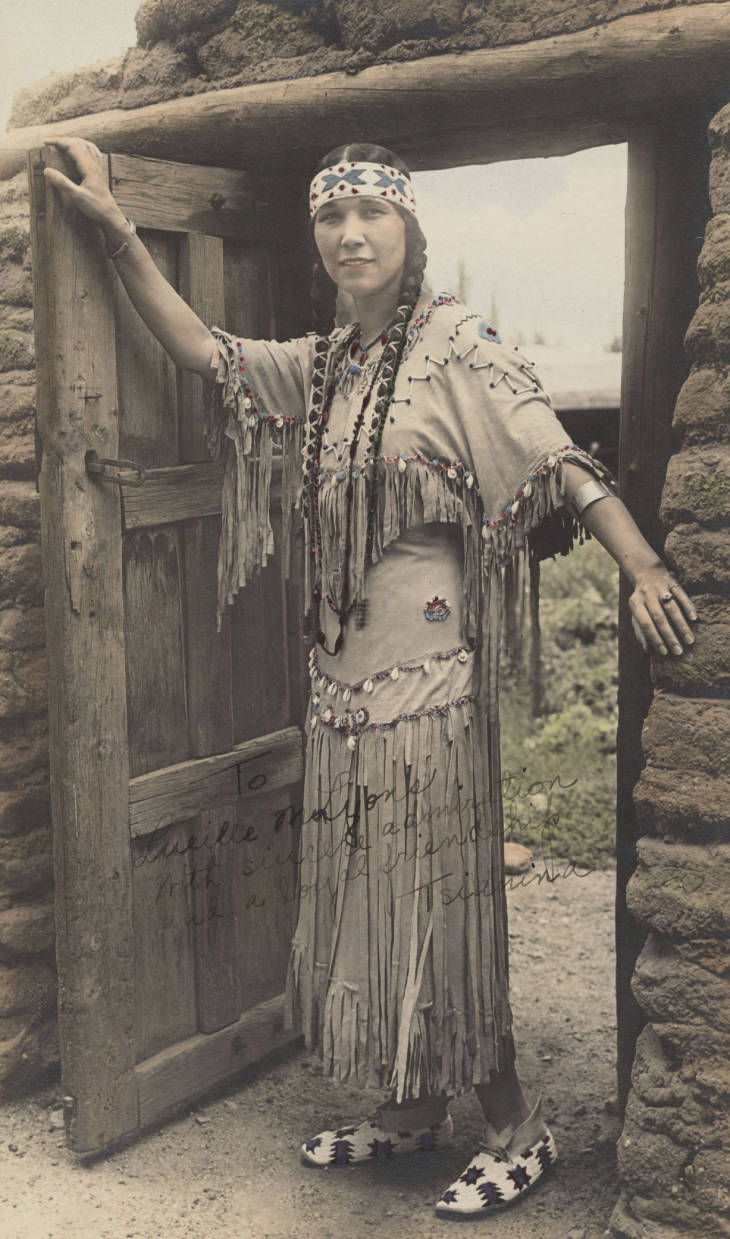
Tsianina Redfeather c. 1917-1918

Tsianina Redfeather Blackstone (December 13, 1882 – January 10, 1985) was a Muscogee singer, performer, and Native American activist, born in Eufaula, Oklahoma, within the Muscogee Nation. She was born to Cherokee and Creek parents and stood out from her 9 siblings musically. From 1908 she toured regularly with Charles Wakefield Cadman, a composer and pianist who gave lectures about Native American music that were accompanied by his compositions and her singing. He composed classically based works associated with the Indianist movement. They toured in the United States and Europe.

She collaborated with him and Nelle Richmond Eberhart on the libretto of the opera Shanewis (or "The Robin Woman," 1918), which was based on her semi-autobiographical stories and contemporary issues for Native Americans. It premiered at the Metropolitan Opera. Redfeather sang the title role when the opera was on tour, making her debut when the work was performed in Denver in 1924, and also performing in it in Los Angeles in 1926.

After her performing career, she worked as an activist on Indian education, co-founding the American Indian Education Foundation. She also supported Native American archeology and ethnology, serving on the Board of Managers for the School of American Research founded in Santa Fe by Alice Cunningham Fletcher.

== Early life ==
Tsianina Redfeather was born Florence Tsianina Evans at Eufaula, Muscogee Nation, in Indian Territory (now Oklahoma), to Muscogee parents. Her ancestors were forced from their homeland in the Southeast United States and forced to march on the Trail of Tears. All nine of Tsianina's siblings had musical talent, but she was the best. She began training at the age of 14 in Denver, Colorado, sponsored in part by Alice Robertson. She had earned scholarships in Denver and New York City. While training in Denver, Tsianina became a mezzo-soprano virtuoso and met Charles Cadman, an American pianist, who later became her partner in touring and performing across the globe.

== Career ==
At age 26, Redfeather joined American pianist Charles Wakefield Cadman on tour, giving recitals throughout North America. Cadman, who was white, had studied Native American music from ethnology sources and was lecturing on it, starting in 1908. He also was creating work drawn from Indian music. In the summer of 1909 he went to Nebraska, where he studied Omaha and Winnebago music on the reservations. He also learned to play some traditional instruments.

Beginning in 1908, Cadman conducted lecture tours speaking about American Indian music and performed recitals on the subject, including his own songs, and accompanied by Redfeather as singer. They began touring and performing in the capitals of Europe and the Metropolitan Opera House with most of the major symphony orchestras in the United States. As "Princess Tsianina Redfeather", she performed Cadman's compositions wearing traditional costume, with her hair in long braids. She beaded her own garments and signature headband. Cadman's composition "From The Land of Sky-Blue Water" was written especially for her and became Redfeather's signature song.

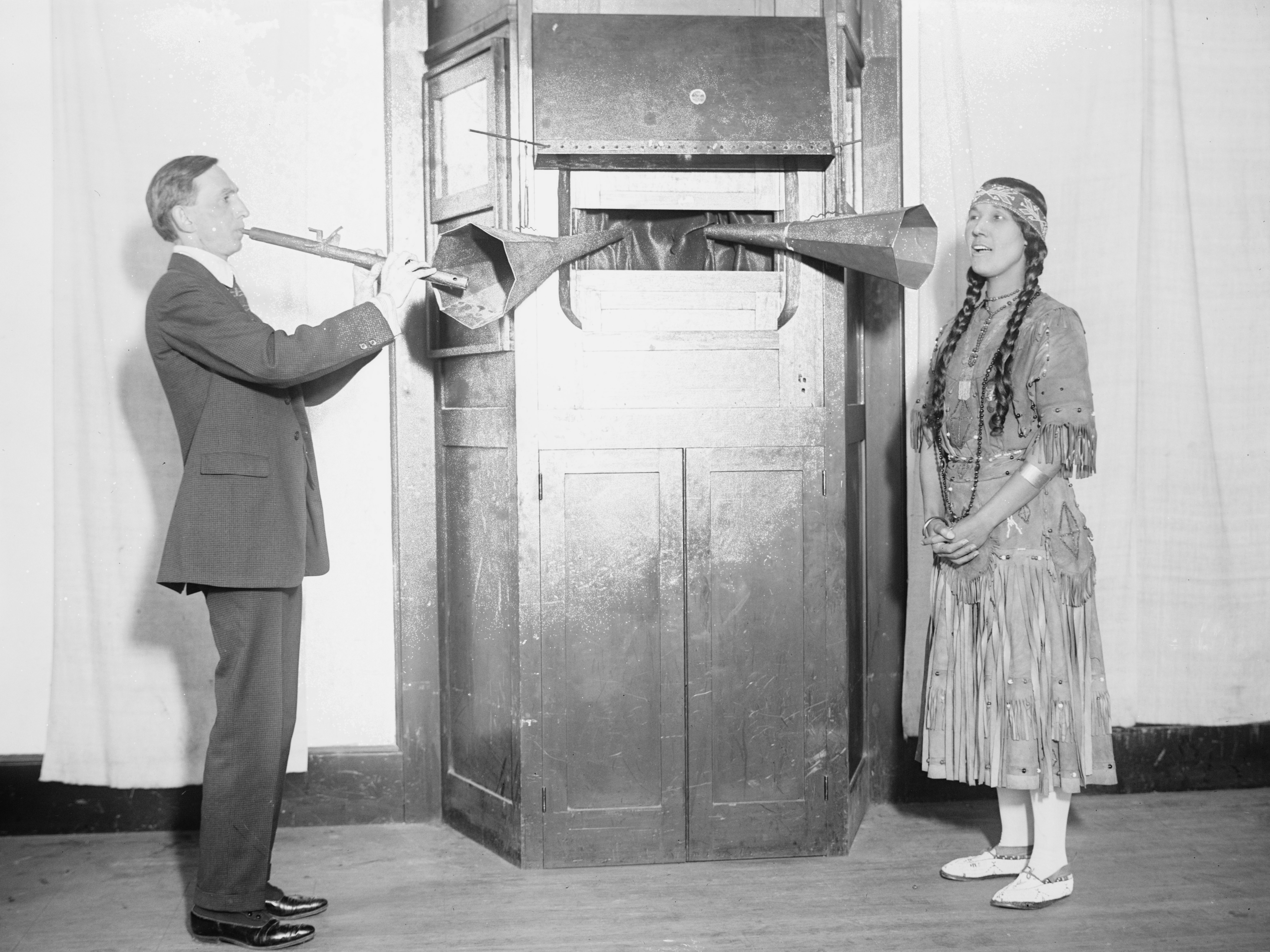
Tsianina Redfeather Blackstone sings and Charles Wakefield Cadman plays flute for a recording between 1920 and 1925

She collaborated with Cadman and his librettist Nelle Richmond Eberhart in creating the opera Shanewis (or The Robin Woman). Its contemporary plot was loosely based on Redfeather's semi-autobiographical stories of Native American life, and was set in California and Oklahoma. The work debuted at the Metropolitan Opera in 1918 and was performed also the next season. Highly popular, it toured the United States. Tsianina sang the lead at some performances on tour, making her opera debut in the role in Denver in 1924. She reprised it in 1926 at the Hollywood Bowl in Los Angeles.

During World War I in 1918, Redfeather was the head of a YMCA-sponsored troupe of Native American entertainers who toured France and Germany, performing for American troops. The title of the show was "The Indian of yesterday and today." She described the others as "twenty Indian boys". She and Cadman debuted Shanewis at the Metropolitan Opera; the cast received 22 curtain calls. Cadman based the opera on Native American stories told by Tsianina. This opera became the first contemporary opera to be performed for a second season at the Met. General John J. Pershing honored her as one of the first women to volunteer to entertain the troops. She was the first woman to cross the Rhine to reach US troops in Germany.

In 1922, Redfeather performed for a group of real estate investors including Dr. D.O. Norton who had built a resort property near Fort Collins. The investors were so moved by her performance they named their mountain village in her honor and gave Indian names to much of the area.

In 1935, Redfeather retired from singing but was still working on Indian issues. She was one of the founders of the American Indian Education Foundation (AIEF). She also served for 30 years on the Board of Managers for the School of American Research in Santa Fe. Intended to promote archeological and ethnological research in the United States related to Native Americans, the institute was founded by ethnologist Alice Cunningham Fletcher.

Amateur archaeologist Edgar Lee Hewett, who had achieved some status and donated substantial money to the school, was made director. Redfeather recounted that upon meeting Hewett, he told her that he admired the shape of her head and hoped to have it for his museum after she died. "He frightened me," she recalled, "and I had a secret fear of having my skull on display for all to see."

== Personal life ==
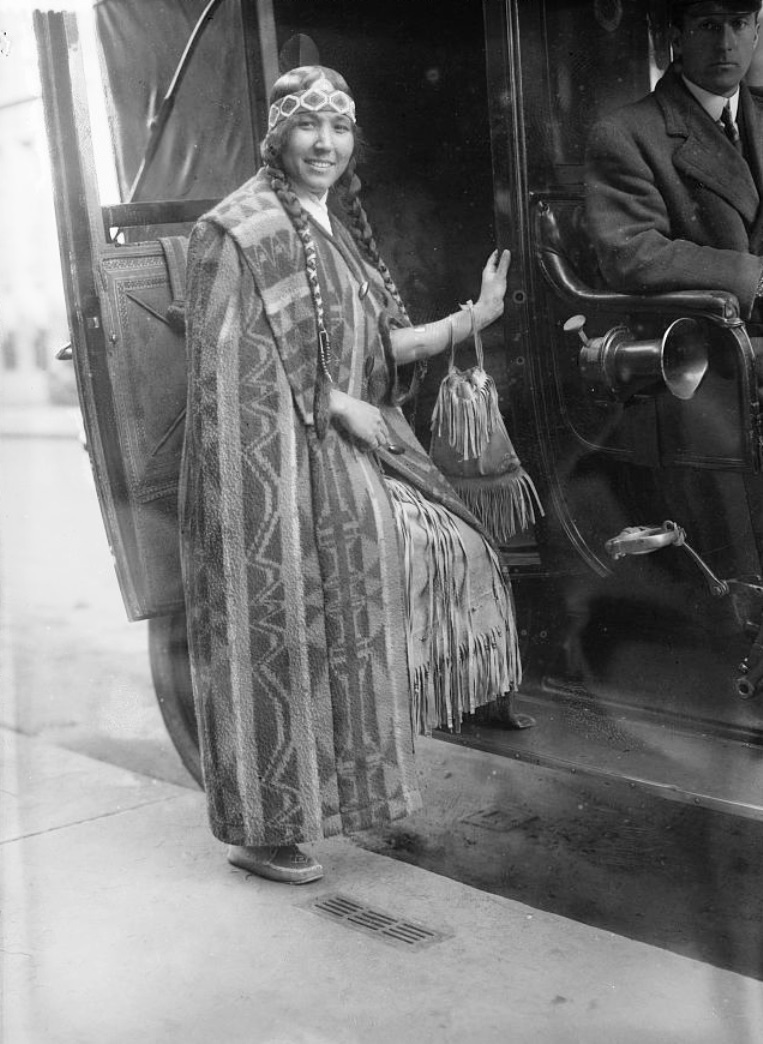
Tsianina Redfeather in 1915

Born "Florence Evans" to Wiley & Lettie Evans, Tsianina Redfeather was one of at least nine children. Her autobiography indicates that some of her siblings may have died at early ages so they were not included in the census.

In her autobiography Where Trails Have Led Me, Redfeather briefly touches on the government land allotment provided to her family due to the terms of the forced removal and expounds on how the allotment was extorted from her family by Sooners after Oklahoma was ratified as a state. Redfeather mentions that there was a local practice where Native Americans were rounded into wagons and forcibly made to drink alcohol. This developed into alcoholism for Redfeather's father and uncle, and the family was driven into abject poverty as a result. In the 1910 census records, it indicates that Redfeather briefly resided with her aunt & uncle, Laura and Alex Evans, before attending boarding school.

Redfeather and her siblings were recognized descendants of Chief Tecumseh. This was through Redfeather's father, Wiley Evans. Both of Redfeather's parents were of mixed race (Native American and African American), and Redfeather's mother was also descended from slaves contributing to Redfeather's later activist efforts.

In 1920, Redfeather married David F. Balz of Denver. Based on the timeline from her autobiography, David Balz was serving as one of Redfeather's agents during her Denver tour and was at least aware of the decision to not share telegrams regarding her mother's illness and subsequent death. Redfeather's agents withheld this information so that she would complete a tour that was proving to be highly lucreative for them, attracting the most affluent critics and socialites to her novel performances. This likely contributed to Redfeather's divorce with Balz in later years when she became aware of the deceit. After Redfeather & Balz divorced, Redfeather remarried. Her second husband was named Blackstone. They also divorced.

Redfeather converted to Christian Science and was a Christian Science practitioner from June 1942 to April 1981. She eventually settled in California, where she lived with her niece Wynemah Blaylock (sometimes spelled Blalock) in Burbank. They later moved to San Diego.

In 1981 Redfeather was baptized in the Catholic faith at St. John's Church in San Diego by Monsignor Andrew Hanley. In her obituary he described her as a "lovely lovely person" and that "she was just an outstanding person." After Redfeather died in 1985, age 102, a funeral mass for her was held at St. John's. Her niece said she was descended from "Indian royalty."

Redfeather personally funded the education of at least two native children from her tribe. She did not receive much profit from her illustrious career (even though she was exceptionally famous); but Redfeather was very altruistic and made sure to contribute to scholarships for children within the Muscogee Creek Nation. Redfeather also founded The First Daughters of America, a foundation for Native American Women.

Although broadcast and recording capabilities were available for much of her career, Redfeather's music was not recorded due to her tribe's objection of native sacred art and customs being misappropriated.

In celebration for the Red Feather Ranger Station's 50th Anniversary, the community planned a Red Feather History month in July 1988. R.J. Wiley created a painting of Tsianina for a play being put on about her life.

Redfeather had two nieces by her brother, Robert Lee Evans, whom she mentions in the 2nd edition of her autobiography as living near her briefly when she resided in Colorado. Redfeather also included a note regarding her tribal enrollment card #3612 along with her legal name "Florence Evans" to publicly validate her lineage as false claims of native ancestry became highly popular in the 1960s–1970s. Her tribal card on file with the Muscogee Nation is linked to several of her siblings' descendants via tribal enrollment.
