= Patrick DesJarlait =

Ojibwe artist (1921–1972)

Patrick DesJarlait Sr. (1921–1972) was an Ojibwe artist and a member of the Red Lake Band of Chippewa Indians. Known for his watercolor paintings, DesJarlait created roughly 300 artworks during his lifetime. DesJarlait's art represents an early diversion from the Studio School style that developed at the Santa Fe Indian School and was popular during the first half of the twentieth century. His paintings are known for their tactile brushwork, abstraction of figures and places, and subject matter specific to Ojibwe peoples.

== Early life ==
Born to Solomon DesJarlait and Elizabeth Blake DesJarlait, Patrick DesJarlait was the fourth of seven children. He spent the majority of his childhood on the Red Lake Reservation. In a 1971 interview, DesJarlait positively recalled his rural childhood, including seasonal events and his favorite pastimes. He was temporarily blinded by trachoma at age five, but avidly pursued drawing after his full recovery. His mother died when he was seven years old.

DesJarlait attended three federal Indian boarding schools during his primary education. St. Mary's Mission Boarding School in Redby, Minnesota was the first. DesJarlait recalled the school as strictly enforcing rules against speaking Ojibwe and partaking in crafts, games, or other traditions associated with Ojibwe culture. He encountered similarly strict regulations at his second school, Red Lake Boarding School, but it provided more free time for its students. DesJarlait participated in creating decorations for the school and continued to draw regularly. The artist then transferred to Pipestone Boarding School. Located in Pipestone, Minnesota, the school was over six hours away from DesJarlait's home. He would later refer to his time at Pipestone as a turning point. DesJarlait met Indigenous students from various parts of the United States and white families in the town. While at this school, he was able to pursue art when teachers encouraged him to take on art projects and during his three years as a member of a Boy Scout Troop.

As a teenager, DesJarlait returned to Red Lake to attend Red Lake Senior High School. He credits his work on stage scenery for school plays as influencing his later interest in mural art. An English teacher at Red Lake High, Dorothy Ross, was particularly influential in encouraging DesJarlait's artistic pursuits. Ross provided DesJarlait with art books, materials, and art publications during his high school years. By the time of his graduation, he decided to pursue commercial art as a career.

== College and military service ==
After completing his high school education, DesJarlait received a year scholarship from the Bureau of Indian Affairs and went on to study art at Arizona State College in Phoenix. He became aware of cubism, post-impressionism, Diego Rivera's mural art, and the Studio School Style during his time at the college.

In 1942, a representative of the Bureau of Indian Affairs and the U.S. Army offered DesJarlait a job supervising an art program. DesJarlait moved to the Poston Internment Camp, a concentration camp for forcibly relocated Japanese Americans, located on the Colorado River Indian Reservation in Arizona. He oversaw the organization of an art program for the incarcerated citizens as well as the creation of a camp newspaper. DesJarlait was impacted by his experiences, noting later that many of the people in his art program were talented artists from professional art backgrounds. He drew comparisons between the experiences of interred Japanese Americans and the forced relocations and restrictions endured by Indigenous peoples.

DesJarlait was inducted into the U.S. Navy during the spring of 1942, and moved to San Diego, California. His time in the Navy consisted primarily of working in the Visual Aids Department at Naval Base San Diego. DesJarlait, along with fourteen other artists, created animated films demonstrating the assembly of torpedoes and other jobs. Several of these artists rented garages and turned them into art studios where DesJarlait and others painted in their spare time.

== Fine Art Career ==
DesJarlait continued to paint scenes from his memories of Red Lake Reservation while in San Diego. His friends spread knowledge of his unique, developing style to others in the area. The Fine Arts Gallery in San Diego facilitated the artist's first solo exhibition in 1945. Every painting in the gallery sold by the end of the exhibition.

The artist returned to Red Lake Reservation for a year following his 1945 discharge from the Navy. DesJarlait honed his signature style of watercolor paintings during this time and dedicated himself to recording Ojibwe subjects in his art. Three paintings completed in 1946 evidence his mature style: Red Lake Fishermen (collection of Robert DesJarlait), Making Wild Rice (Philbrook Museum of Art), and Maple Sugar Time (Philbrook Museum of Art). Making Wild Rice and Maple Sugar Time were purchased by the Philbrook Museum of Art in Tulsa, Oklahoma, after DesJarlait entered them in the 1946 and 1947 Indian Arts Exhibitions.

DesJarlait moved to the Twin Cities with his family to pursue commercial art opportunities after his year at Red Lake. He maintained a personal art practice throughout his commercial career. His paintings received greater recognition beginning in the 1960s. Altering the date of Red Lake Fishermen to 1961, DesJarlait entered the painting at the Scottsdale, Arizona, Indian Arts Exhibition. It won the grand prize. This was followed by the artist winning prizes at the Inter-tribal Indian Ceremonials in Gallup, New Mexico, the All-American Indian Art Exhibition in Sheridan, Wyoming, a Scottsdale exhibition, and the first prize for Wild Rice Harvest at the Philbrook Museum of Art in 1969. DesJarlait continued to paint for the rest of his life.

Artworks by DesJarlait are found in the collections of the Philbrook Museum of Art, the Heard Museum, the Minnesota Historical Society, the Minnesota Museum of American Art, and many other public and private collections. His art has been the subject of renewed interest in the decades following his death. DesJarlait was the subject of a museum survey in 1995 at the Minnesota Museum of American Art. His work also appeared in the Smithsonian National Museum of the American Indian’s 2013 exhibition of Anishinaabe art, titled “Before and After the Horizon: Anishinaabe Artists of the Great Lakes.”

== Commercial Art Career ==
DesJarlait maintained a varied commercial art career for twenty-six years. He worked for various film companies, advertising agencies, and the visual aids department of a defense system company. He helped develop many advertising campaigns in the Twin Cities area, including the Minnegasco maiden, Standard Gas firebird logo, the Hamm's Beer bear, and a redesign of the Land O’ Lakes butter maiden. DesJarlait expressed particular fondness of his work on the Hamm's bear, referring to it as “one of my most delightful accomplishments in commercial art.” DesJarlait's design for the butter maiden was retired in 2020.

== Personal life ==
DesJarlait met his first wife, Eleanor Luther of Laguna Pueblo, in 1942. They had one daughter, Patricia. Their marriage dissolved in 1945 before his return to Red Lake. Upon his return to Red Lake Reservation, the artist married a childhood acquaintance, Mona Needham. They had five children: Robert, Patrick, Randy, Delmar, Ronald, and Charmaine. He credited his wife and children with encouraging him to continue his personal work during his time as a commercial artist. DesJarlait spent the final years of his life traveling to schools in Minnesota to teach students about Ojibwe culture and mentoring younger Indigenous artists. In 1972, DesJarlait died of complications from cancer at fifty-one years old.

== Art Work ==
DesJarlait's painting style is characterized by his abstracted figures, vibrant colors, and signature use of dashes to build up areas of the artwork. He referenced these dashes, created by small strokes of a paintbrush, as creating a “rounded, moving effect” intended to guide the eye of the viewer. His figures are recognized by their delineated facial features and rounded bodies. DesJarlait's attention to detail and emphasis on brushstrokes resulted in paintings that required numerous hours of work to be completed.

The majority of his artworks focus on contemporary Red Lake Ojibwe subjects. This contemporaneity is emphasized by the clothing shown in his paintings. DesJarlait saw his art as having a role in shaping a positive record of Ojibwe life for both non-Native and Ojibwe audiences. Most of his well-known artworks consist of singular figures or groups engaged in work. Later in his career, DesJarlait depicted Ojibwe dancers as well, reflecting the Red Lake Pow-wow and the growing presence of urban pow-wows in places like the Twin Cities.

Various critics have ascribed influences to DesJarlait's art that range from cubism to the Mexican muralist Diego Rivera. The artist rejected these direct associations and considered himself to be self-taught. DesJarlait would occasionally allude to Vincent Van Gogh’s earlier works and compare his own use of dashes to the dots of George Seurat’s pointillism. While his position on similarities between his paintings and traditional Ojibwe art shifted over time, he saw his work as an extension of Ojibwe storytelling and oral tradition.

In DesJarlait's autobiography, the modernist artist George Morrison described DesJarlait as “one of the first respected ‘modern’ artists to have a following” as an Indigenous person and as an inspiration for younger generations.
