= Marie Muchmore =

Witness of JFK's assassination (1909–1990)

- Born: Marie Mobley; August 5, 1909; Ardmore, Oklahoma, U.S.
- Died: April 26, 1990 (aged 80); Dallas, Texas, U.S.

Marie M. Muchmore (August 5, 1909 – April 26, 1990) was one of the witnesses to the assassination of United States President John F. Kennedy in Dallas, Texas, on November 22, 1963. A color 8 mm film that Muchmore made is one of the primary documents of the assassination. The Muchmore film, with other 8 mm films taken by Abraham Zapruder and Orville Nix, was used by the Warren Commission to investigate the assassination and to position the presidential limousine in a forensic recreation of the event in May 1964.

== Early years ==
Muchmore was born Marie Mobley in Ardmore, Oklahoma. Her mother was Chickasaw, listed as half Chickasaw by blood on the Dawes Rolls. One of her sisters was Tessie Mobley (1906–1990), who became a notable operatic soprano. Muchmore had no children.

== JFK assassination ==
Muchmore was an employee of Justin McCarty Dress Manufacturer in Dallas located at 707 Young Street, four blocks south of the Texas School Book Depository. On November 22, 1963, Muchmore was in Dealey Plaza with five co-workers, including Wilma Bond, who had a still camera, to watch the presidential motorcade. Muchmore stood near the northwest corner of Main Street and Houston Street with her 8 mm Keystone K-7 zoom-lens 8mm home movie camera and awaited the president's arrival.

The Muchmore film consists of seven sequences: six before the assassination, and one during the shooting. Muchmore began filming the presidential motorcade with her movie camera from her initial location near the northwest corner of Main and Houston Streets as the motorcade turned onto Houston Street into Dealey Plaza. She then turned and walked with Wilma Bond several yards northwestward to again film the President's limousine as it went down Elm Street. Her film then captured the fatal shot to the President's head, seen from about 138 feet (42 m) away. The film ends seconds later as Secret Service agent Clint Hill, attempting to protect President Kennedy, runs to and then quickly climbs on board the accelerating limousine.

Muchmore sold the undeveloped film to the Dallas office of United Press International on November 25, 1963, for $1,000. It was processed by Kodak in Dallas, and flown to New York City. It appeared the following day on local television station WNEW-TV. The film now belongs to the Associated Press Television News, which restored it in 2002.

While visiting her family in Oklahoma for Thanksgiving, Muchmore told them about the film she had taken of the assassination; her family then told the FBI about the film. The FBI initially interviewed Muchmore in December 1963, during which she admitted she had a camera with her but denied that she took any pictures of the assassination scene. The FBI was unaware of the film's existence until a frame enlargement was published in the UPI book Four Days: The Historical Record of the Death of President Kennedy in January 1964. A subsequent FBI interview in February 1964 says:

Mrs. Muchmore stated that after the car turned on Elm Street from Houston Street, she heard a loud noise which at first she thought was a firecracker but then with the crowd of people running in all directions and hearing the two further noises, sounding like gunfire, she advised that she began to run to find a place to hide.
