= Theodore Hamm =

American brewery executive (1825–1903)

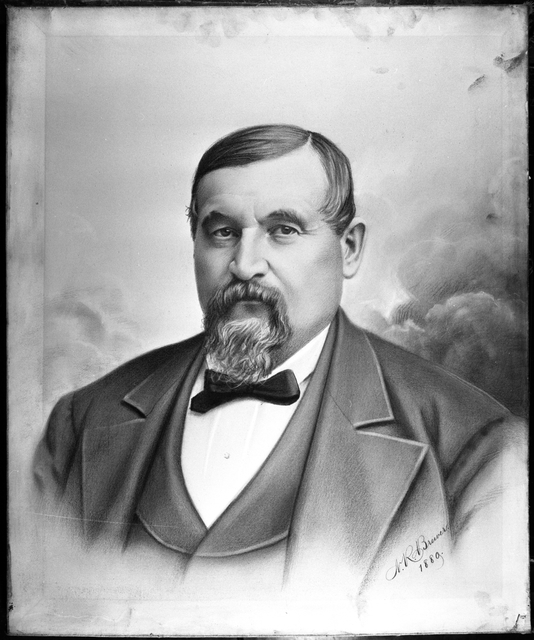
- Hamm c. 1880
- Born: October 14, 1825 or October 17, 1825; Herbolzheim, Grand Duchy of Baden
- Died: July 31, 1903 (aged 78); Saint Paul, Minnesota
- Occupation: Founder of Hamm's Brewery
- Spouse: Louise Buchholz m. c. 1856
- Children: 6
- Relatives: William Hamm Jr. (grandson)

Theodore Hamm (October 14 or October 17, 1825 – July 31, 1903) was the founder of Hamm's Brewery.

== Biography ==
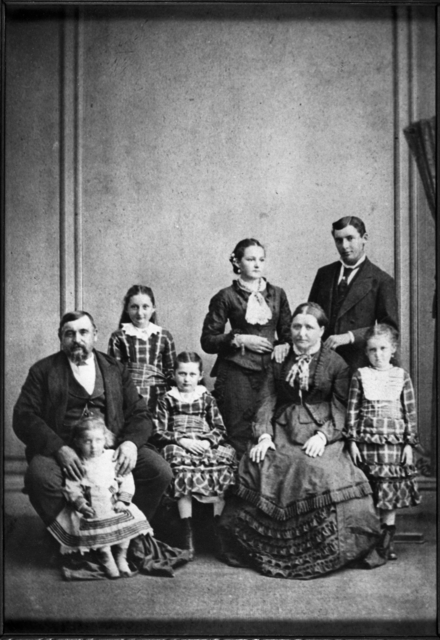
Hamm's family

Theodore Hamm was born in Herbolzheim, Germany, on October 14 or 17, 1825 to Johann and Franziska Hamm. Theodore was the third of ten children. He left Herbolzheim at the age of twenty-eight, briefly spending time in Freiburg before emigrating to Buffalo, New York in 1854. After working there shortly as a butcher, he moved to Chicago. He would soon bring his future wife Louise Buchholz from Germany to Chicago. In 1856, shortly after their marriage, they moved to Saint Paul, Minnesota. Hamm opened a saloon at the corner of Third Street and Robert Street in Saint Paul. He later operated a saloon on West Seventh street. In 1865, Hamm acquired the brewery of A. F. Keller, and eventually renamed it to Hamm's Brewery. (Note: Sources disagree on whether Hamm purchased the brewery or whether his partner defaulted on a loan for which the brewery was collateral.)

Hamm and his wife had one son, William, and five daughters.

Hamm died on July 31, 1903, of heart failure. His funeral was held on August 2, with a brief United Ancient Order of Druids service at his mansion before a Requiem Mass at the Church of the Sacred Heart in St. Paul. He was buried at Calvary Cemetery.
