= Ramón Vinay =

Chilean operatic tenor (1911–1996)

- Ramón Vinay, 1949
- Born: August 31, 1911; Chillán, Chile
- Died: 4 January 1996 (aged 84); Mexico
- Occupation: Opera singer (tenor)
- Spouse: Tessie Mobley

Ramón Vinay (August 31, 1911 – January 4, 1996) was a famous Chilean operatic tenor with a powerful, dramatic voice. He is probably best remembered for his appearances in the title role of Giuseppe Verdi's tragic opera Otello.

== Biography ==
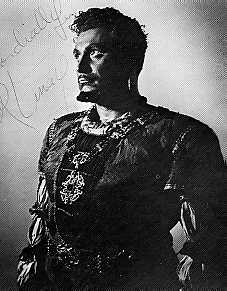
Ramón Vinay in Otello

He started his operatic career as a baritone in Mexico in 1938. He later switched to tenor, making a second debut in 1943 and forging a successful international career after World War II. Vinay eventually returned to the baritone fold in 1962 and retired from the stage in 1969.

Even as a tenor, however, his vocal timbre retained its dark, baritonal colouration.

He was the son of Jean Vinay Robert and Rosa Sepúlveda. Born in Chillán, Chile, Vinay trained with famed Lamperti student, José Pierson, in Mexico. Vinay earned particular renown throughout the operatic world for his interpretation of the role of Otello. For a time, he made the part his own. Perhaps his most significant appearance as Otello occurred in 1947, in a radio broadcast of the opera under the baton of Arturo Toscanini. His colleagues on this occasion were Herva Nelli, Giuseppe Valdengo and Nan Merriman, together with the NBC Symphony Orchestra and Chorus. This performance was subsequently issued by RCA Victor on both LP and CD. In recent years, it has appeared on CDs issued by other companies, notably on the Guild label. Many critics consider it the best complete Otello ever recorded.

A fine actor, Vinay was also the first tenor to sing the role of Otello on television. That was in 1948, in the initial telecast of an entire opera from the Met. He also sang Otello at La Scala, in Salzburg and at the Royal Opera House, Covent Garden. In all, he performed it hundreds of times. He is said to be one of the two opera singers to have sung both Otello and Iago (the baritone villain) in Verdi's tragic masterpiece during the course of a career (the other being Carlos Guichandut).

Vinay's overall tenor repertoire was comparatively ample. It also embraced heavy Wagnerian roles (he sang at the Bayreuth Festival in 1952–57), as well as Canio in Leoncavallo's Pagliacci, Don José in Bizet's Carmen and Samson in Saint-Saëns's Samson et Dalila. Apart from Iago, the baritone parts which he performed included Telramund, Bartolo, Falstaff and Scarpia. In 1971, he also briefly returned from retirement to perform as the Grand Inquisitor in Verdi's Don Carlo, a role originally written for the bass voice.

He was a National Patron of Delta Omicron, an international professional music fraternity.

He died in Mexico, aged 84.

Vinay was married to Oklahoma-born soprano Tessie Mobley.

== Selected recordings ==
- Bizet – Carmen (Stokowski/Heidt, Pease, M. Koshetz) – Eklipse
- Leoncavallo – Pagliacci (Antonicelli/Quarteraro, Warren, Thompson) – Guild
- Saint-Saëns – Samson et Dalila (Cellini/Stevens) – VAI
- Verdi – Otello (Toscanini/Nelli, Valdengo) – RCA
- Verdi – Otello (Busch/Albanese, Warren) – Preiser Arkadia
- Verdi – Otello (Furtwängler/Martinis, Schöffler) – EMI
- Verdi – Otello (Cleva 1950/1951/excerpts/Steber, Guarrera) – Preiser
- Verdi – Otello (Beecham 1958/Stella, Taddei, Modesti) – Idis
- Wagner – Lohengrin (Sawallisch/Thomas, Silja, Varnay, Crass) – Philips
- Wagner – Parsifal (Krauss/Mödl, London, Weber, Uhde, Greindl) – Arlecchino
- Wagner – Parsifal (Knappertsbusch/Mödl, Fischer-Dieskau, Greindl) – Myto
- Wagner – Der Ring des Nibelungen (Keilberth/Mödl, Resnik, Hotter, Windgassen, Uhde, Weber) – Melodram
- Wagner – Der Ring des Nibelungen (Krauss/Varnay, Hotter, Resnik, Greindl, Malaniuk) – Gala
- Wagner – Tannhäuser (Keilberth/Brouwenstijn, Fischer-Dieskau, Greindl)- Melodram
- Wagner – Tristan und Isolde (Jochum/Varnay, Neidlinger, Weber, Malaniuk) – Melodram
- Wagner – Tristan und Isolde (Karajan/Mödl, Weber, Hotter, Malaniuk) – Myto
- Recital live (Arias by Verdi, Leoncavallo, Saint-Saëns, Wagner, duets with Ljuba Welitsch) – Melodram
- Four Famous Met-Tenors of the Past (Peerce, Björling, Tucker) – Preiser – LV
- Met – 100 Singers – RCA

== Audio examples ==
- Richard Wagner, Walküre 2. Aufzug: "Weh! Weh! Suessestes Weib!"

Dirigent: Clemens Krauss; Festspielhaus Bayreuth, 1953

- Richard Wagner, Lohengrin 2. Aufzug: "Erhebe dich, Genossin meiner Schmach!" (as Telramund)

Dirigent: Wolfgang Sawallisch; Festspielhaus Bayreuth, 1962

- Richard Wagner, Lohengrin 2. Aufzug: "Du wilde Seherin" (as Telramund)

Dirigent: Wolfgang Sawallisch; Festspielhaus Bayreuth, 1962
