= Shanewis =

1918 opera by Charles Wakefield Cadman

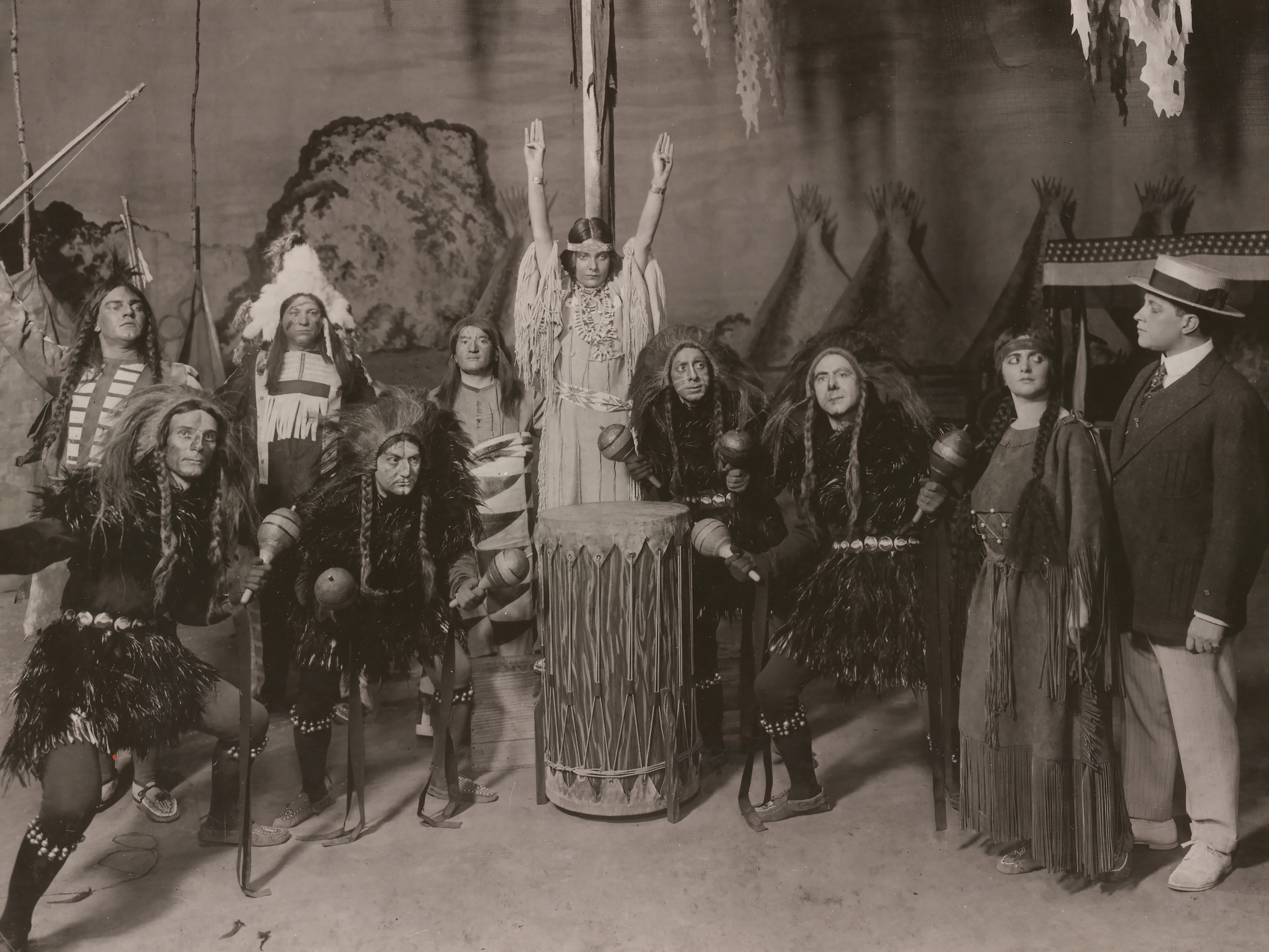
Scene from the premiere production of Shanewis, 1918; Sophie Braslau is at center

Shanewis (or The Robin Woman) (1918) is an opera in one act and two scenes by American composer Charles Wakefield Cadman with an English-language libretto by Nelle Richmond Eberhart. Cadman called the work an "American opera."

They collaborated with Tsianina Redfeather Blackstone, a Cherokee/Creek singer, who contributed elements from her life for the contemporary plot related to Native American issues. Blackstone sang the lead role in her opera debut when it was performed in Denver in 1924, and also performed in Los Angeles in 1926.

== Performance history ==
The opera, which debuted at the Metropolitan Opera in New York City on March 23, 1918, is the first American opera to have been presented at the Metropolitan Opera for more than a single season. Over a two-season span, it was performed eight times. The opera was later introduced to Denver in 1924 and the Hollywood Bowl in Los Angeles in 1926.

At the Denver performance of 1924, the title role was performed by soprano Tsianina Redfeather Blackstone (Creek) in her operatic debut. She also sang the lead in Los Angeles. Redfeather had earlier been a touring partner of Cadman when he lectured and performed Native American music.

Redfeather collaborated on the libretto of the opera, although she received no official credit. She provided many of the semi-autobiographical plot elements.

== Roles ==
Role	Voice type	Premiere cast, March 23, 1918 (Conductor: Roberto Moranzoni)
Shanewis	Mezzo-soprano	Sophie Braslau
Mrs. J. Asher Everton	Contralto	Kathleen Howard
Amy Everton	Soprano	Marie Sundelius
Lionel Rhodes	Tenor	Paul Althouse
Philip Harjo	Baritone	Thomas Chalmers
California society people; Oklahoma Indians, half-breeds and whites		Metropolitan Opera Chorus

== Synopsis ==
Adapted from the "Argument" published in the piano-vocal score of 1918:

=== Scene 1 ===
Setting: Music room in the house of Mrs. J. Asher Everton in Southern California
Mrs. J. Asher Everton, a wealthy widow and clubwoman, has taken under her wing the young Indian singer Shanewis, sending her to New York to further her education in music. After some years, she is invited to spend the summer at Mrs. Everton's seaside bungalow. Meanwhile Amy, Mrs. Everton's daughter, has returned following her graduation from Vassar College, and her mother decides to give a soiree in honor of them both. At the dinner Shanewis sings "The Spring Song of the Robin Woman", attracting the approbation of many of the guests and the attention of architect Lionel Rhodes, Amy's fiancé. Meeting her, he calls her "Enchantress" and begins to press his suit while they are alone in the room. Shanewis, hesitant at first and unknowing of his attachment to Amy, gradually yields to his entreaties. She secures a promise from him that he will visit her home on the reservation and seek approval from her family; the interview is interrupted by Amy's entrance with another of the guests. She senses Shanewis' confusion, and expresses jealousy, which Lionel attempts to soothe. At this juncture the guests return from their dancing and prepare to take their departure, teasing Amy as they go about Lionel's interest in Shanewis. The latter turns out the lights in the music room, and in the moonlight stands musing over her new romance.

=== Scene 2 ===
Setting: The reservation, Oklahoma, during the conclusion of a summer powwow
Shanewis has returned to the reservation, secretly followed by Lionel; as the scene begins they are shown watching the closing scenes of the powwow. Lionel watches the undertaking, and the crowd, with interest. Moved by the ceremonial songs and the atmosphere, he finds himself growing more enamored of Shanewis. The latter is presented by Philip Harjo, her foster-brother, with a poisoned arrow said to have been used by a maiden of the tribe to punish a white betrayer; hearing the story, Lionel assures Harjo that Shanewis will never need the weapon. Harjo reveals himself to be a traditionalist fanatic who has come to blame whites for all the ills suffered by Indians, and to resent modernity in general. From childhood he has loved Shanewis, but kept his passion secret as she embarked on a musical career, hoping that she would fail and return to the reservation, and to his love. He is stung by her love for a white man, and watches for a chance to prove the latter worthless.

Shanewis and Lionel attract attention from the crowd, including from a jazz band of youths that serenade them. He asks her to leave early but she wishes to stay to the end. As the public departs, Mrs. Everton and Amy appear, having followed Lionel in an attempt to break his attachment. He refuses, but Shanewis rejects him; it is the first she has heard of his engagement, and she insists in repaying her debt to Mrs. Everton by returning him to Amy. She denounces whites and their treachery in their dealings with her tribe, and declares that she will go into the forest, far from civilization and close to God, to seek solace. She throws the bow and arrow away from her; this is witnessed from behind a tree by Harjo, who seizes the weapon and shoots Lionel in the heart. Shanewis runs back to the scene and with Amy kneels by his body; as Mrs. Everton pulls her daughter away, Shanewis looks to the heavens and says, "'Tis well. In death thou art mine!"
