= From the Land of the Sky-Blue Water =

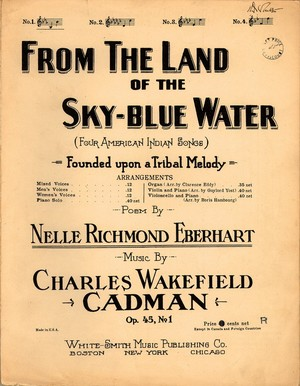
- Sheet music cover, 1909

Song
- Published: 1909
- Composer(s): Charles Wakefield Cadman
- Lyricist(s): Nelle Richmond Eberhart

Audio sample
- Recording of From the Land of the Sky-Blue Water, performed by Evan Williams (1915): file; help

"From the Land of the Sky-Blue Water" (1909) is a popular song composed by Charles Wakefield Cadman. He based it on an Omaha love song collected by Alice C. Fletcher. "Sky-blue water" or "clear blue water" is one possible translation of "Mnisota", the name for the Minnesota River in the Dakota language.

== Composition ==
Cadman's collaborator, Nelle Richmond Eberhart, wrote a poem as the lyrics:

From the Land of Sky-blue Water,
They brought a captive maid,
And her eyes they are lit with lightnings,
Her heart is not afraid!

But I steal to her lodge at dawning,
I woo her with my flute;
She is sick for the Sky-blue Water,
The captive maid is mute.

The song became widely popular after noted American soprano Lillian Nordica performed it in concert in 1909.

== Representation in other media ==
- An arrangement of the song for harp and flute is performed by Harpo Marx in the 1940 Marx Bros. film, Go West.
- Blanche DuBois in A Streetcar Named Desire by Tennessee Williams sings a part of the song in Scene Two while she is in the bathroom.
- The first line, "From the Land of Sky-blue Water", is sung by the Three Stooges in the film The Three Stooges In Orbit (1962), at about the three-quarter point in the film, before they launch into space for the first time.
- The Hamm's Brewery used a version of the lyrics- "From the land of sky blue waters/ comes the beer refreshing" - as an advertising jingle through the mid-twentieth century, accompanied by pseudo-Native American drumming.
- The song is quoted twice in "Hiawatha," a song by Laurie Anderson on the 1989 album Strange Angels. After quoting lines from the poem The Song of Hiawatha by Henry Wadsworth Longfellow, the intro ends with the words "from the land of sky blue water."

== Bibliography ==
- Cadman, Charles Wakefield (m); Eberhart, Nelle Richmond (w). "Hamm's Brewery" (Sheet music). Boston : White-Smith Music Publishing Company (1909).
