= Nelle Richmond Eberhart =

American poet

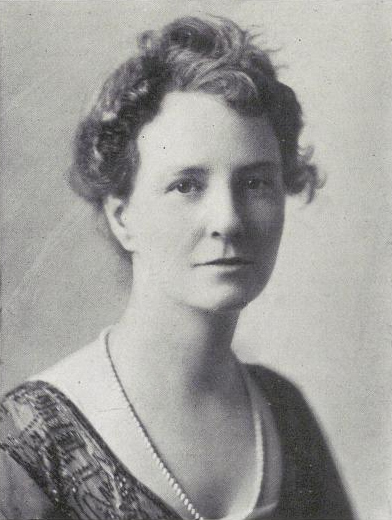
Nelle Richmond Eberhart

Nelle Richmond Eberhart (August 28, 1871 – November 15, 1944) was an American librettist, poet, and teacher. She is known for her long collaboration with composer Charles Wakefield Cadman. She wrote 200 songs and the librettos for five operas for which he composed the music.

== Early life ==
Eberhart was born Ellen Loretta McCurdy in 1871 in Detroit, Michigan, daughter of John Thomas and Cora Amelia Newton McCurdy. Her mother remarried. At an early age, Nelle was given her stepfather's surname, Richmond. Her family moved to Nebraska, where she was raised.

As a young woman she developed a strong interest in music. She gained certification and taught school. In 1894 Richmond married Oscar Eberhart, a physician. They had a daughter together, Constance Richmond Eberhart. She became an opera singer and teacher of voice. She sang as a member of the Chicago Civic Opera and the American Opera Company.

== Career ==
The Eberhart family moved to Pittsburgh, Pennsylvania in 1900 for her husband's work. In 1902, Eberhart met a young neighbor Charles Wakefield Cadman. When she learned he was studying and writing music, they began to work together. She wrote the words for a hymn and he the music, for their first song. She wrote the lyrics for some 200 songs, and the librettos for the five operas that they created together. His "Four American Indian Songs Op. 45" (which included "From the Land of Sky-Blue Water") was his first commercial success in 1909, after the noted soprano Nordica performed the song in Cleveland.

Their first opera, Da O Ma (1912), set in Sioux culture, was never produced. But their second opera Shanewis, or The Robin Woman (1918) was premiered by the Metropolitan Opera in New York City; it was also performed there for a second, succeeding season. Eberhart was the first woman librettist to have her work performed by that company. The opera was taken on tour, being produced in Denver in 1924 and Los Angeles in 1926.

Eberhart wrote the libretto for The Garden of Mystery, music by Cadman, which was performed in 1925 at Carnegie Hall in New York. Later, she wrote The Willow Tree (1932, music by Cadman), one of the first operas commissioned for radio, certainly the first for American radio.

In addition to her emphasis on Native American themes, Eberhart also showed interest in Asian and Pacific Island themes. She wrote lyrics for "Sayonara: A Japanese Romance for One or Two Voices, op. 49," and "Idyls of the South Seas" (music by Cadman). Her interest in historical drama inspired their A Witch of Salem: An American Opera (1926), music by Cadman.

She also wrote several Christian hymns ("The Dawn of Peace Resplendent Breaks," "Give Praise," "O Come and Adore Him"), and general sentimental art songs ("I Hear a Thrush at Eve," "Lilacs," "Memories," "The Moon Behind the Cottonwood").

Eberhart also published poetry in literary reviews and general interest publications, such as Granite Monthly and Munsey's Magazine.

== Personal life ==
The Eberhart couple left Pittsburgh in 1917, living next in New York and then Chicago. In 1941 they moved to Kansas City, Missouri, where they lived the rest of their lives.

Oscar's nephew, Alanson Eberhart, was married to Mignon G. Eberhart, a prolific mystery writer. Mignon dedicated her seventh novel (The White Cockatoo, 1933) to Nelle Richmond Eberhart and her collaborator, composer Charles Wakefield Cadman.

Nelle Richmond Eberhart died in 1944, in Kansas City, Missouri.
