= Charles Wakefield Cadman =

American composer

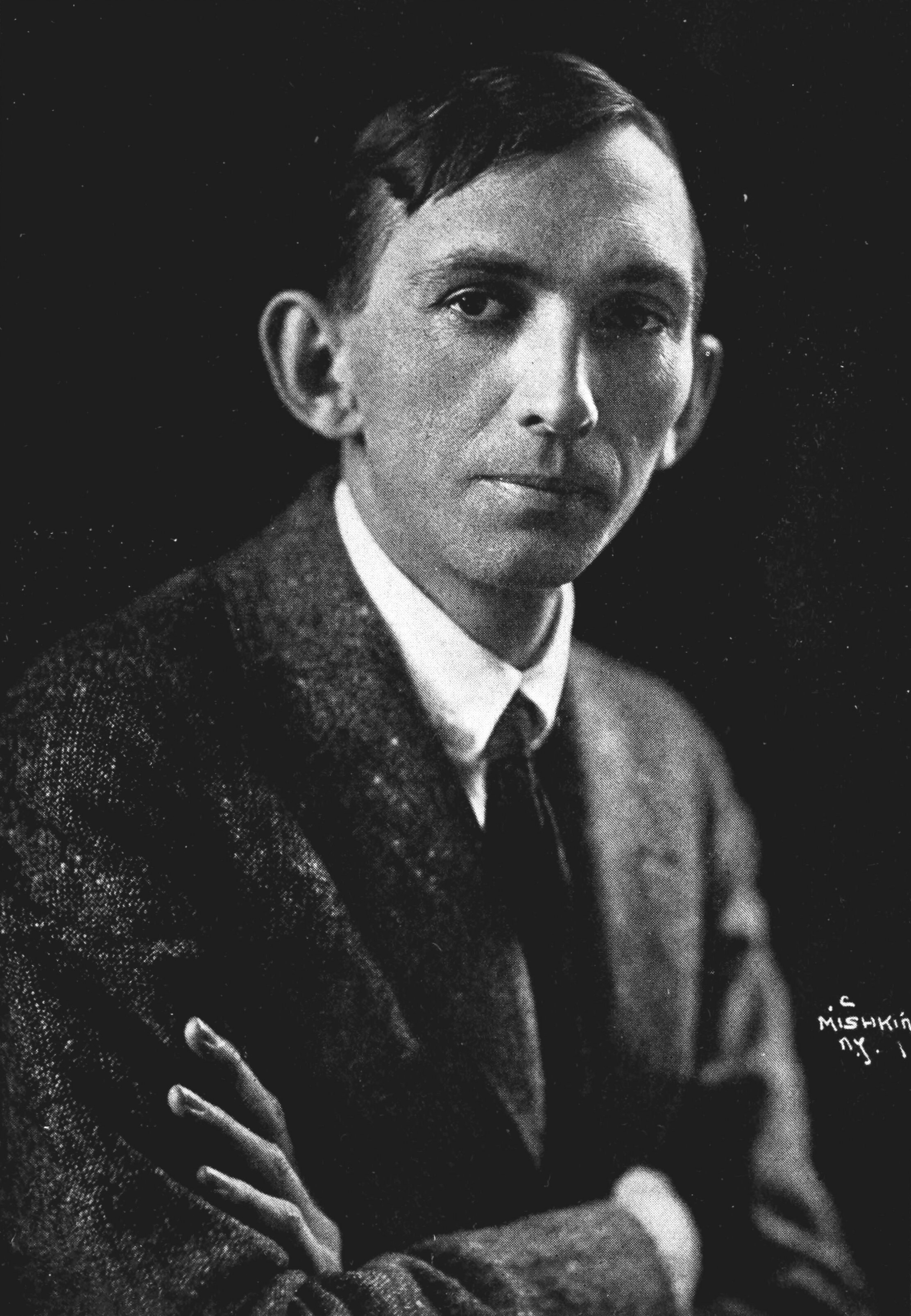
Cadman in 1919

Charles Wakefield Cadman (December 24, 1881 – December 30, 1946) was an American composer. For 40 years, he worked closely with Nelle Richmond Eberhart, who wrote most of the texts to his songs, including Four American Indian Songs. She also wrote the librettos for his five operas, two of which were based on Indian themes. He composed in a wide variety of genres.

== Life and career ==
Cadman's musical education, unlike that of most of his American contemporaries, was completely American. Born in Johnstown, Pennsylvania, he began piano lessons at 13. Eventually, he went to nearby Pittsburgh where he studied harmony, theory, and orchestration with Luigi von Kunits and Emil Paur, then concertmaster and conductor, respectively, of the Pittsburgh Symphony Orchestra. This was the sum of his formal training, although he has been said to have been a pupil of Anna Priscilla Risher as well.

By the age of eighteen, he was working as a clerk in a railroad office in Homestead, also in steel country. On the side, he continued writing music. In 1902 he met neighbor Nelle Richmond Eberhart and learned that she was interested in music.

They began to work together, she writing the text and he the music for their first piece, a hymn for which they were paid one and a half dollars. Their collaboration began, and it continued for 40 years.

In 1908, Cadman was appointed as the music editor and critic of the Pittsburgh Dispatch. He was greatly influenced by American Indian music, which he had been studying, especially through the work of ethnologists Alice Fletcher and Francis La Flesche. Fletcher and La Flesche had studied the Omaha Tribe and recorded their music and stories.

Having published several articles on American Indian music, Cadman became regarded as one of the foremost experts on the subject. In 1908 he began touring to present lectures known as the "Indian Talk", or "Indian Music Tour", accompanied by the performance of Native American music and his own compositions. Tsianina Redfeather (Muscogee/Cherokee), billed as "Princess Redfeather", performed as a singer on some of his tours. Her signature song was Cadman's "From the Land of the Sky-Blue Water". Another such song was "At Dawning", which became widely known in the 1920s. Cadman toured both the US and Europe for 25 years to present this lecture.

Cadman drew from Omaha and Iroquois songs for his Four American Indian Songs, Op. 45, which became his first commercial success in 1909. This was aided by performances of these songs by noted soprano Lillian Nordica, who was on a concert tour. In the summer of 1909 he went to Nebraska to study the music and traditional instruments of the Omaha and Winnebago tribes. He lived with the people on their reservations, learning to play their instruments.

During his trip to the West, he met Francis La Flesche, an Omaha ethnologist who was working with the Smithsonian Institution on studies of the Omaha and Osage peoples. Cadman assisted him in making recordings on wax cylinders of traditional songs. These works are now held by the Library of Congress, and some 60 songs are available online. Cadman drew from La Flesche's recordings, and he was also interested in his stories collected from these peoples.

They began work that year on an opera; Cadman had already started to pull melodies from three printed collections of Omaha and Pawnee music published by ethnologist Alice Cunningham Fletcher, who also was with the Smithsonian. The songs were transcribed or harmonized by others.

Cadman and Eberhart worked closely with La Flesche by mail, and he continued to provide Cadman with Omaha melodies for the opera. They were not permitted to use melodies which La Flesche had collected for an as yet unpublished report for the Smithsonian. Together with librettist Nelle Richmond Eberhart, Cadman and La Flesche worked together for about three more years to create an opera based on Omaha stories and music. Cadman made occasional Indian Music tours to raise money for the project. He moved to Denver in 1911.

Cadman completed the music for Da O Ma (1912) and sought a venue for it, but it was never produced or published. It was rejected by the Boston Opera Company, the White-Smith Music Publishing Company, which had published numerous songs by Cadman; and the Metropolitan Opera. In the course of their work, the team had changed the opera from an Omaha to Sioux (Lakota/Dakota) setting. Cadman did gain some distribution for this music: selections from the opera were published by White-Smith in 1917 as a piano suite, and by Boosey in 1920 as an orchestral suite.

In 1915 Cadman was named a national honorary member of Phi Mu Alpha Sinfonia music fraternity.

Cadman and Eberhart began another project with La Flesche, but he withdrew because of differences. They collaborated with Tsianina Redfeather Blackstone, a Muscogee/Cherokee singer who had performed with Cadman on tour. She provided much of the plot for the libretto of The Robin Woman (Shanewis), based on contemporary Native American issues. The opera was produced by the Metropolitan Opera of New York in 1918, and, unusually, was performed for two concurrent seasons.

It was very popular in the 1920s, performed also in Denver and Los Angeles. Redfeather made her opera debut in the lead role in a 1924 performance in Denver, and also sang it in Los Angeles in 1926.

Some scholars believe that Cadman's involvement with the so-called Indianist movement in American music resulted in some critics failing to judge his works on their own merits. While his and similar works were popular in the early 20th century, they have since fallen out of favor.

=== Move to Los Angeles ===
In the 1920s, Cadman moved to Los Angeles, California. He helped to found the Hollywood Bowl Orchestra and often performed there as a solo pianist. His opera Shanewis was performed there in 1926.

He became involved with the film studios, writing the scores for several films. These included The Sky Hawk (1929), Captain of the Guard (1930), a musical set during the French Revolution; Women Everywhere, and Harmony at Home, all Pre-code films. Along with Russian-American Dmitri Tiomkin, Cadman was considered one of Hollywood's top film composers of the period.

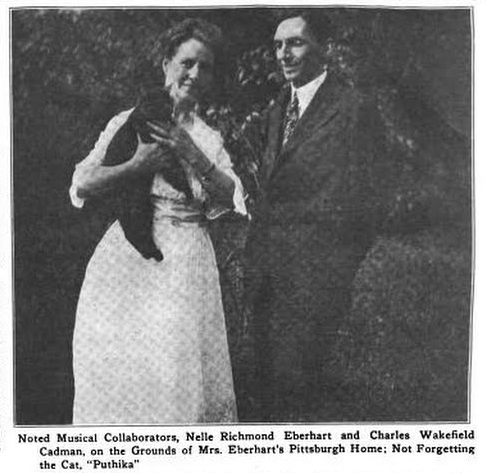
Nelle Richmond Eberhart and Charles Wakefield Cadman, with a cat, from a 1916 publication.

But Cadman first and foremost was a serious composer who wrote for nearly every genre. His chamber music works are generally considered among his best. He introduced elements of ragtime music into the classical music format, anticipating Gershwin, Stravinsky, and Milhaud, among others. His Piano Trio, Op. 56, composed in 1913, drew the critics' attention and praise for his innovations.

His opera The Sunset Trail (1922) was part of the touring repertoire of Vladimir Rosing's American Opera Company.

The Pageant of Colorado, a historical pageant with music composed by Cadman to a libretto by Lillian White Spencer, was produced in Denver, Colorado in May 1927. Dramatist and playwright Percy Jewett Burrell, a fraternity colleague of Cadman, directed the production.

== Selected works ==
Operas and operettas

- The Land of the Misty Waters or Da O Ma (1912)
- Shanewis or The Robin Woman (1918)
- The Sunset Trail (1922)
- The Garden of Mystery (1925, after Rappaccini's Daughter)
- The Ghost of Lollypop Bay (1926)
- Lelawala (1926)
- A Witch of Salem (1926)
- The Belle of Havana (1928)
- South of Sonora (1932)
- The Willow Tree, Radio Opera (1932)
- Ramala, revision of The Land of the Misty Waters (unperformed)

American Indian art songs

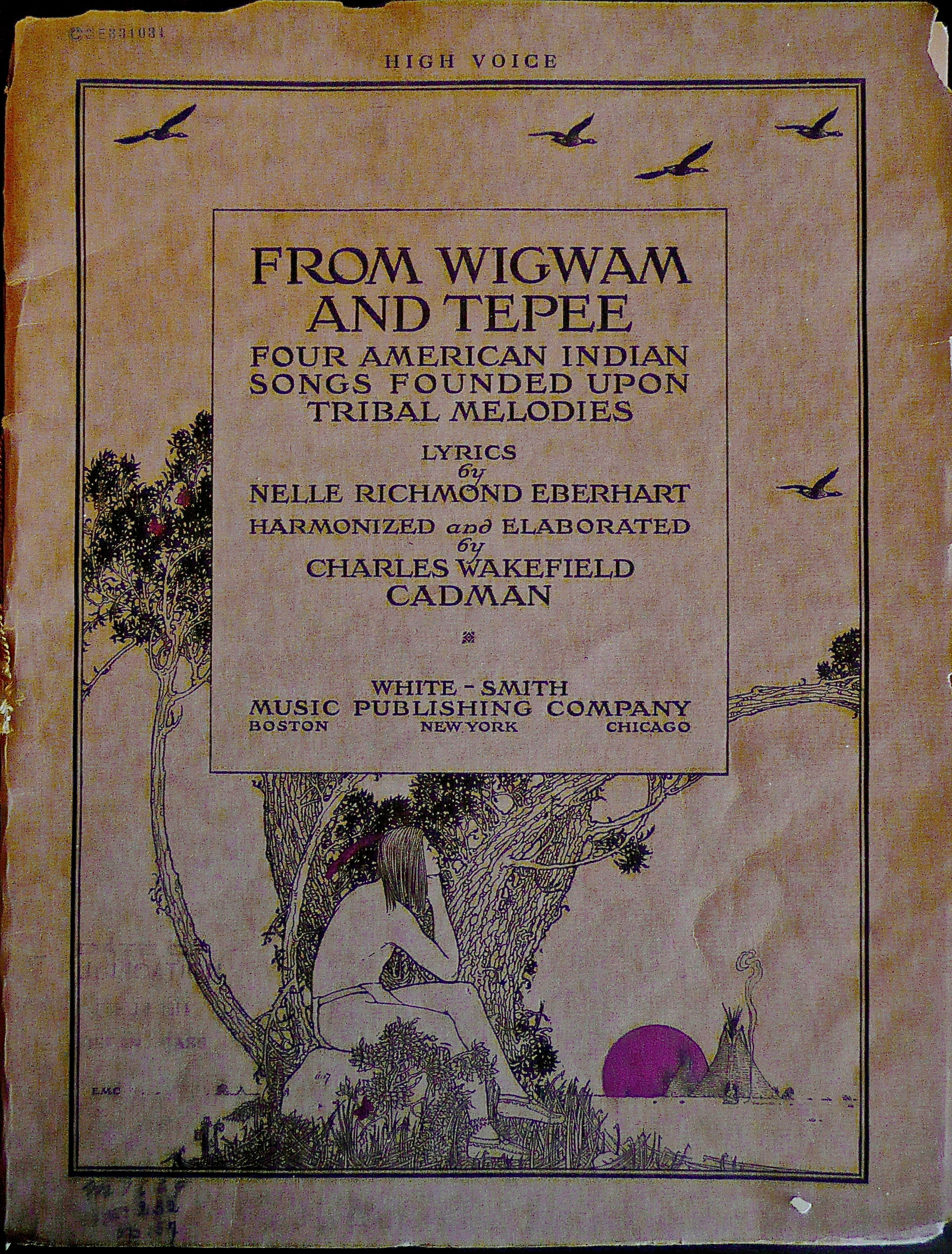
From Wigwam and Teepee - Four American Indian Songs founded upon Tribal Melodies

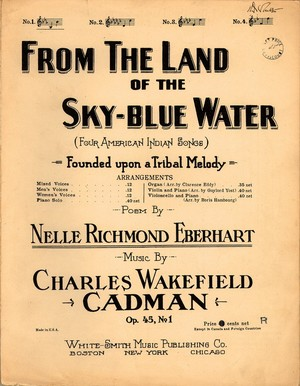
"From the Land of the Sky-Blue Water" (1909)

- From Wigwam and Teepee, Op. 57 (also known as Four American Indian Songs); words by Nelle Richmond Eberhart; Edwin H. Morris publisher, 1914
1. "The Place of Breaking Light"
2. "From the Long Room of the Sea"
3. "Ho, Ye Warriors on the Warpat"
4. "The Thunderbirds Come from the Cedars"
- "The Doe-Skinned Blanket"; words by Cecil Fanning; Edwin H. Morris publisher, 1919
- "From the Land of the Sky-Blue Water", Op. 45 No. 1; words by Nelle Richmond Eberhart; White-Smith Music Publishing Co., 1909
- Her Shadow (Ojibway Canoe Song); words by Frederick R. Burton; Edwin H. Morris publisher, 1918
- He Who Moves in the Dew; words by Nelle Richmond Eberhart; Edwin H. Morris publisher, 1916
- I Found Him on the Mesa; words by Nelle Richmond Eberhart; Edwin H. Morris publisher, 1913
- The New Trail (Indian Duet); words by Nelle Richmond Eberhart; Edwin H. Morris publisher, 1928

Other art songs

300 total songs, including:

- At Dawning Op.29.1 (1906)
- It Is Morning Again (unknown author), published by G. Schirmer
- Joy (unknown author), published by G. Schirmer
- The Moon Behind the Cottonwood words by Nelle Richmond Eberhart, published by G. Schirmer
- A Moonlight Song (unknown author), published by G. Schirmer
- Sayonara
- Welcome! Sweet Wind (unknown author), published by G. Schirmer
- The Willow Wind
- Could Roses Speak Op.26.1 (1906)
- My Sweetheart Of Paradise (1923) (lyrics by John Steel), published by Sherman Clay & Co., San Francisco

Orchestral

- Thunderbird Suite (1914)
- The Feather of the Dawn (1923)
- To a Vanishing Race (1925)
- Oriental Rhapsody (1929)
- Dark Dancers of Mardi Gras (1933)
- Trail Pictures Suite (1934)
- American Suite (1936)
- Suite on American Folksongs (1937)
- Pennsylvania Symphony in e minor (1939)
- Aurora Borealis (1944)

Concertante

- A Mad Empress Remembers for solo cello and orchestra (1944)

Chamber music

- String Quartet (1917)
- To a Vanishing Race for 2 violins, viola, cello and double bass (published 1917)
- Piano Trio in D major, Op. 56 (1913)
- Sonata for violin and piano (1937)
- Piano Quintet in g minor (1937)
- A Mad Empress Remembers for cello and piano (1944)

Organ music

- Meditation in D♭ (1904)
- Legend in F, Op. 30 No. 1 (1906)
- Caprice in G, Op. 30 No. 2 (1906)

== Bibliography ==
- The New Grove Dictionary of Music & Musicians, Ed. S. Sadie, Macmillan, London 1980
- The Chamber Music Journal ISSN 1535-1726, Vol.XIII No.1, Riverwoods, Illinois 2002 (Permission to quote and copy has been granted under the GNU License. Some of this information has already appeared elsewhere including but not limited to the website of Edition Silvertrust)
