= Sławiński =

Slawinski or Sławiński (feminine: Sławińska, plural: Sławińscy) is a Polish surname. Notable people with the surname include:

- Adam Sławiński (born 1935), Polish composer
- Agnieszka Sławińska, Polish operatic soprano
- Andrzej Sławiński (born 1951), Polish economist
- Janusz Sławiński (1934–2014), Polish literary theorist
- Johnny Slawinski (born 2007), American baseball player
- Joseph Slawinski (died 1983), American artist
- Kendra Slawinski (born 1962), English netball player
- Oliwier Sławiński (born 2005), Polish footballer
- Stanisław Sławiński (born 1948), Polish university lecturer
