= L'Amour de loin =

2000 French-language opera by Kaija Saariaho

- Opera by Kaija Saariaho
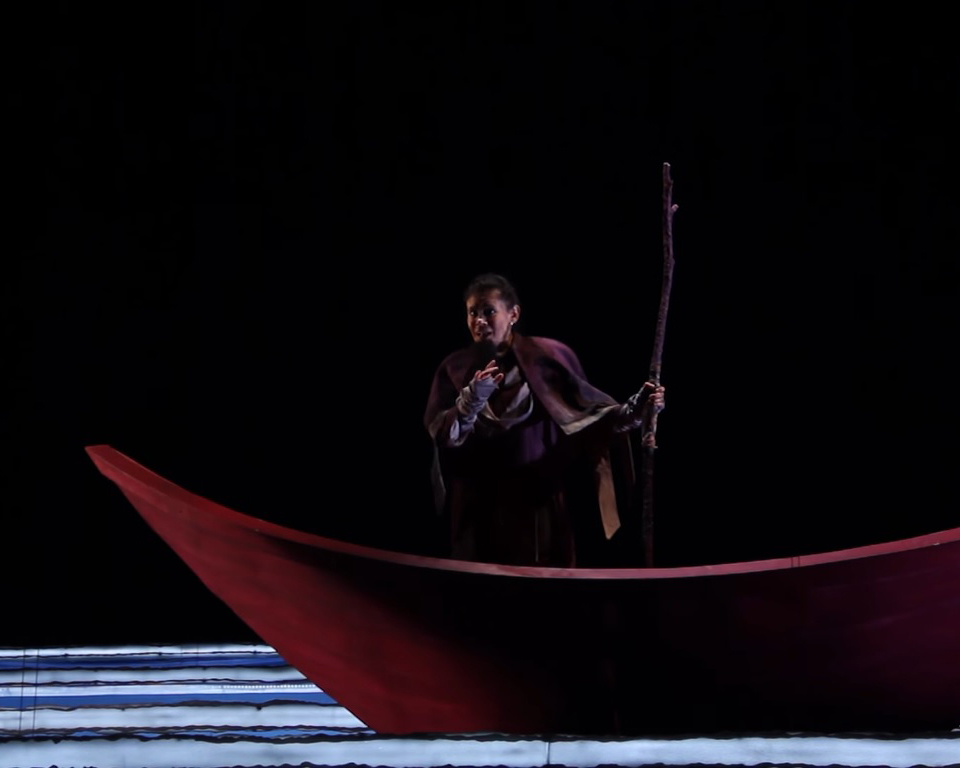
- Translation: Love from Afar
- Librettist: Amin Maalouf
- Language: French
- Based on: La Vida breve by Jaufre Rudel
- Premiere: 15 August 2000; Salzburg Festival

L'Amour de loin (Love from Afar) is an opera in five acts with music by Kaija Saariaho and a French-language libretto by Amin Maalouf. The opera received its world premiere performance on 15 August 2000 at the Salzburg Festival.

Saariaho, living in Paris since 1982, had become familiar in 1993 with La vida breve by one of the first great 12th-century troubadours, Jaufré Rudel. She did not think she was capable of writing an opera until she saw Peter Sellars's staging of Messiaen’s opera Saint François d'Assise at the 1992 Salzburg Festival. "If that is an opera, then I can write one", she has said she thought.

Her idea for the opera evolved over the following seven or eight years. She first set a Jaufré poem to music in Lonh (1996) for soprano and electronic instruments.

The sensibilities and backgrounds of both Maalouf, a Lebanese-French author and journalist also living in Paris, and Saariaho – both voluntary exiles – brought them together to turn "a seemingly simple story into a complex story very simply told...[and with] the straightforward trajectory of its plot, L’Amour de loin turns anxiously around deeper themes – obsession and devotion, reality and illusion, the loneliness of the artist, the need to belong".

Having secured an advance commitment from Salzburg Festival director Gerard Mortier to stage the opera, Saariaho began L'Amour de loin in 1999. The SWR Sinfonieorchester Baden-Baden-Freiburg, an ensemble well known for its excellence in contemporary music, was also on board.

L'Amour de loin received the 2003 Grawemeyer Award for Music Composition.

== Performance history ==
The opera's first production became a joint commission by the Théâtre du Châtelet in Paris and the Santa Fe Opera in addition to Salzburg. Peter Sellars directed the original production, as well as several later ones. The US premiere occurred on 27 July 2002 at the Santa Fe Opera.

Additional productions were staged at Stadttheater Bern, Switzerland (December 2001 onward), in Darmstadt, Germany, in the spring of 2003, and at the Finnish National Opera in Helsinki in 2004.

In 2005, Jan Latham-Koenig conducted two concert performances as part of the Al Bustan International Festival of Music and the Arts in Beirut.

In 2008, the Bergen International Festival in Bergen, Norway, opened with a production by the artists Michael Elmgreen and Ingar Dragset, produced by Bergen National Opera (previously Den Nye Opera). They created an animated film in place of a stage setting.

The English National Opera presented a new production in July 2009 at the London Coliseum, sung in English. This same production was given by Vlaamse Opera in September 2010, and by the Canadian Opera Company in February 2012.

The Landestheater Linz presented a new production in 2015.

The Festival d'Opéra de Québec staged the opera, directed by Robert Lepage, during its Summer 2015 season. This same production was then staged at the Metropolitan Opera, the company's first production of the opera, in December 2016, conducted by Susanna Mälkki. This marked the Metropolitan Opera's first staging of an opera by a female composer since the company's 1903 production of Der Wald by Ethel Smyth. This opera was transmitted to cinemas on 10 December 2016 as part of the Metropolitan Opera Live in HD series, the first opera by a female composer, and the first opera conducted by a female conductor, in this series. The 2016 Met production was streamed online on 6 May 2020.

== Roles ==
Role	Voice type	Premiere cast, 15 August 2000 (Conductor: Kent Nagano)	Premiere recording (video) cast, September 2004 (Conductor: Esa-Pekka Salonen)
Jaufré Rudel, Prince of Blaye, and troubadour obsessed with idealized love	baritone	Dwayne Croft	Gerald Finley
The Pilgrim, the go-between who carries messages back and forth	mezzo-soprano	Dagmar Pecková	Monica Groop
Clémence, the Countess of Tripoli	soprano	Dawn Upshaw	Dawn Upshaw
Chorus
Stage director		Peter Sellars	Peter Sellars
Scenic designer		George Tsypin	George Tsypin
Costume designer		Martin Pakledinaz	Martin Pakledinaz
Lighting designer		James F. Ingalls	James F. Ingalls

== Synopsis ==
Place: In Aquitaine, Tripoli, and at sea
Time: 12th century

=== Act 1 ===
Jaufré, having become weary of the pleasures of life, longs for a different love, one far away, but realizes that it is unlikely that he will ever find her. The chorus, made up of his old companions, laughs at his dreams and tells him the woman he sings about does not exist. Then a Pilgrim (male but sung by a mezzo-soprano) recently arrived from abroad tells Jaufré that such a woman does indeed exist because the Pilgrim has met her. Jaufré devotes himself to thinking only of her.

=== Act 2 ===
The Pilgrim returns to Tripoli, meets Clémence, and tells her that, in France, a prince-troubadour extols her in his songs, calling her his "love from afar". This initially offends her, but Clémence begins to dream of this strange and faraway lover, asking herself if she is worthy to receive such devotion.

=== Act 3 ===
First Scene

Upon his return to Blaye, the Pilgrim again meets Jaufré and tells him that the lady now knows that he sings about her. Jaufré asks him if he has sung his songs to Clémence correctly, to which he responds "more or less". Jaufré decides that he must travel to meet her. The Pilgrim tells Jaufré Clémence's name and leaves.

Second Scene

Clémence seems to prefer that their relationship remain distant as she is reluctant to live constantly waiting and does not want to suffer.

=== Act 4 ===
On impulse, Jaufré sets out to meet his "love from afar", but not without trepidation. He is anguished about the possibility that he has not made the right decision, so much so that he becomes severely ill, and the sickness increases as he gets closer to Tripoli. The Pilgrim has him rest, and he hallucinates seeing Clémence on the water. By the time he arrives in Tripoli, he is dying.

=== Act 5 ===
The ship berths and the Pilgrim hurries off to tell the countess that Jaufré has arrived, that he is close to death, and that he wants to see her. Carried on a pallet, Jaufré is brought to the citadel unconscious, but recovers somewhat in Clémence's presence. With Jaufré approaching death, the couple embrace and declare their love for each other. After Jaufré dies in her arms, Clémence rages against Heaven and considers herself responsible for the tragedy. She decides to enter a convent and the last scene shows her in prayer. But her words are ambiguous: it is not clear whether the "Love from afar" to whom she is praying on her knees is God or Jaufré.

== Reception ==
L’Amour de loin has been acclaimed since its premiere in 2000. Several writers have referred to Saariaho's score as “hypnotic”. John Allison argued that it “combines with a poetic libretto by Lebanese-born writer Armin Maalouf to exquisite effect. The result is not, it must be said, the most dramatic opera, but then neither is Pelléas or Tristan und Isolde, pieces in which music works powerfully on the imagination.” James Jorden of the Observer wrote that the score “evokes the distance between the loves with downcast modal melodies and a vast, impressionistic palette of soundscapes evoking the sea”, but was more critical of the vocal writing, arguing that Maalouf's French text has “little sense of individualized emotion.” The score was described as “lushly beautiful” in The New York Times. In a 2019 poll of critics of The Guardian, L’Amour de loin was ranked the sixth greatest classical music work of the 21st century.

== Stage productions ==
- 2000: World Premiere Production at the Salzburg Festival, directed by Peter Sellars, conducted by Kent Nagano, starring Dawn Upshaw, Dwayne Croft, and Dagmar Pecková. The same production was reprised with different casts and conductors at the Théâtre du Châtelet in Paris in 2001 (French Premiere), at the Santa Fe Opera in 2002 (US Premiere), and at the Finnish National Opera in 2004 (Finnish Premiere), where it was reprised in ulterior seasons and filmed (see Recordings below.)
- 2001: Second Production at the Stadttheater Bern (Swiss Premiere), directed by Olivier Tambosi, conducted by Hans Drewanz, starring Rachel Harnisch, Wolfgang Koch, and Maria Riccarda Wesseling.
- 2003: Third Production at the Staatstheater Darmstadt (German Premiere), directed by Philippe Arlaud, conducted by Stefan Blunier, starring Mary Anne Kruger, Hans Christoph Begemann, and Katrin Gerstenberger.
- 2005: Fourth Production at the Holland Festival (Dutch Premiere), directed by Pierre Audi, conducted by Susanna Mälkki, starring Pia Freund, Hans Christoph Begemann, and Lilli Paasikivi.
- 2006: Fifth Production at MaerzMusik / Haus der Berliner Festspiele. Concert version with live video by multimedia artist Jean-Baptiste Barrière, conducted by Kent Nagano, starring Magali de Prelle, Daniel Belcher, and Marie-Ange Todorovitch, reprised in the same month at the Théâtre du Châtelet with the same musical team, and with another musical team in 2008 at the Clermont-Ferrand Opera and in 2015 at Tokyo Opera City(Japanese Premiere).
- 2008: Sixth Production at the Bergen International Festival / Bergen National Opera(Norwegian Premiere), directed by Elmgreen & Dragset, conducted by Baldur Brönnimann, starring Pia Freund, Jaakko Kortekangas, and Lilli Paasikivi. This production was reprised at the Norwegian National Opera in 2014.
- April 2009: Seventh Production at the Volkstheater Rostock, directed by Christian von Götz, conducted by Ekkehard Klemm, starring Jamila Raimbekova, Olaf Lemme, and Lucie Ceralová.
- July 2009: Eighth Production at the English National Opera (UK stage Premiere), directed by Daniele Finzi Pasca, conducted by Edward Gardner, starring Joan Rodgers, Roderick Williams, and Diana Montague. The same production was reprised with different casts and conductors at the Vlaamse Opera in 2010 (Belgian staged Premiere) and the Canadian Opera Company in 2012 (Canadian Premiere).
- March 2015: Ninth Production at the Landestheater Linz, directed by Daniela Kurz, conducted by Kasper de Roo, starring Gotho Griesmeier, Martin Achrainer, and Martha Hirschmann.
- July 2015: Tenth Production at the Grand Théâtre de Québec / Festival d'Opéra de Québec, directed by Robert Lepage, conducted by Ernest Martinez Izquierdo, starring Erin Wall, Phillip Addis, and Tamara Mumford. This production was reprised at the Metropolitan Opera in New York in 2016, under the baton of Susanna Mälkki and starring Susanna Phillips, Eric Owens and Tamara Mumford; it was then filmed and broadcast worldwide as part of The Met: Live in HD.
- February 2016: Eleventh Production at the Národní divadlo Brno (Czech Premiere), directed by Jiří Heřman, conducted by Marko Ivanović, starring Pavla Vykopalová, Roman Hoza, and Markéta Cukrová.
- 2019: Twelfth Production at the Palacio de Bellas Artes in Mexico City (Latin American Premiere), directed by Mauricio García Lozano, conducted by José Areán, starring Agnieszka Slawinska, Jaakko Kortekangas, and Carla López-Speziale.
- January 2021: Thirteenth Production at the Ekaterinburg Opera and Ballet (Russian Premiere), directed by Yaroslavia Kalesidis, conducted by Konstantin Chudovskiy, starring the opera's ensemble singers.
- October 2021: Fourteenth Production at the Oper Köln, directed by Johannes Erath, conducted by Constantin Trinks, starring Emily Hindrichs, Holger Falk and Adriana Batsidas-Gamboa.

== Recordings ==
- 2004 (DVD): L'Amour de loin with Dawn Upshaw, Gerald Finley, and Monica Groop. Finnish National Opera, Helsinki production in 2004, conducted by Esa-Pekka Salonen. Directed by Peter Sellars. Released 2005.
- 2009 (Audio): Daniel Belcher, Ekaterina Lekhina and Marie-Ange Todorovitch; Deutsches Symphonie-Orchester Berlin, Rundfunkchor Berlin, Kent Nagano, conductor; Martin Sauer, producer (harmonia mundi, 2009)
- 2016 (HD video): Susanna Phillips as Clémence, Tamara Mumford as The Pilgrim, Eric Owens as Jaufré Rudel. Metropolitan Opera Orchestra and Chorus, conducted by Susanna Mälkki. Production by Robert Lepage. Recorded live, 10 December 2016, Metropolitan Opera House.
