= Susanna Phillips =

American singer (born 1981)

Susanna Phillips (Huntington) (born 1981) is an American singer who has sung leading lyric soprano roles at American and international opera houses.

== Early life and education ==
Phillips was born in Birmingham, Alabama and grew up in Huntsville where she attended Randolph School after her family moved there after her birth. Her parents were Barbara Ross Phillips and Dr. Macon Phillips, a rheumatologist who played chamber music.

She gave a recital to an audience of 500 people in her senior year. The singing caught attention of her guidance counselor who encouraged her to attend a conservatory. Eventually, Phillips received Bachelor of Music and Master of Music degrees from the Juilliard School where she was a student of Cynthia Hoffmann. In 2002 and 2003 she attended the Music Academy of the West summer conservatory. After completing her master's degree in 2004, she became a member of the Santa Fe Opera's Apprentice Program for Singers.

In March 2005, she joined the Lyric Opera Center for American Artists at the Lyric Opera of Chicago, now the Ryan Opera Center. During her tenure with the program in Chicago she sang Diana in a new Robert Carsen production of Iphigénie en Tauride opposite Susan Graham, and performed Juliette in Roméo et Juliette and Rosalinde in Die Fledermaus. In 2005, she was also a soloist with the Naumburg Orchestral Concerts, in the Naumburg Bandshell, Central Park, in the summer series.

== Career ==
While at the Lyric Opera of Chicago's LOCAA program, she participated in Santa Fe Opera's 50th Anniversary Arias Gala Concert on August 12, 2006, and sang the role of Pamina in the final two performances of the 2006 season production of The Magic Flute. Following in the 2007 season she sang the role of Fiordiligi in Così fan tutte.

She made her Metropolitan Opera debut on 15 March 2008 singing Musetta in La bohème and has returned to The Met during numerous seasons to sing this role, as well as Pamina (2009, 2010), Donna Anna in Don Giovanni (2012), Fiordiligi in Così fan tutte (2013, 2014), Antonia in Les contes d'Hoffmann (2015), and Rosalinde in Die Fledermaus (2014, 2015, 2016). In 2010 she won the Met's Beverly Sills Award.

She has held leading operatic roles at numerous companies such as Lyric Opera of Chicago, Oper Frankfurt, Santa Fe Opera, Boston Lyric Opera, Minnesota Opera, Opera Birmingham, Fort Worth Opera, Boston Baroque, Ravinia Festival, Aspen Music Festival, Verbier Festival, Gran Teatre del Liceu Barcelona, Gulbenkian Orchestra in Lisbon, and Hyogo Performing Arts Center in Japan. Phillips has appeared with the Royal Stockholm Philharmonic Orchestra under Alan Gilbert, Chicago Symphony Orchestra, San Francisco Symphony Orchestra, Sydney Symphony Orchestra, National Symphony Orchestra (Mexico), Philadelphia Orchestra, Oratorio Society of New York, Santa Fe Symphony Orchestra and Chorus, Santa Barbara Symphony Orchestra, St. Louis Symphony, Music of the Baroque, Chicago, Dallas Symphony Orchestra, Louisiana Philharmonic Orchestra, Milwaukee Symphony Orchestra, Jacksonville Symphony Orchestra, Orchestra of St. Luke's, and the Santa Fe Concert Association.

Phillips works in collaboration with other artists in recital and chamber music performances. Such performances have included those with Paul Neubauer and Anne-Marie Montgomery, at the Parlance Chamber Music Series with Warren Jones, the 2014 Chicago Collaborative Works Festival, the Emerson String Quartet in Thomasville, Georgia with Warren Jones and colleagues from the Metropolitan Opera, and at Twickenham Fest.

== Repertoire ==
=== Opera ===
- Carmen, Micaëla
- Les pêcheurs de perles, Leila
- Midsummer Night's Dream, Helena
- Peter Grimes, Ellen Orford
- The Turn of the Screw, Governess
- L'Elisir d'Amore, Adina
- Orfeo ed Euridice, Euridice
- Roméo et Juliette, Juliette
- Alcina, Alcina
- Agrippina, Agrippina
- Giulio Cesare, Cleopatra
- Rodelinda, Rodelinda
- Die lustige Witwe, Hanna
- Manon, Manon
- Thaïs, Thaïs
- Così fan tutte, Fiordiligi
- Don Giovanni, Donna Anna
- Don Giovanni, Donna Elvira
- Idomeneo, Ilia
- La finta giardiniera, Sandrina
- Le Nozze di Figaro, Countess
- Die Zauberflöte, Pamina
- Les contes d'Hoffmann, Antonia
- Les contes d'Hoffmann, Stella
- Dialogues des Carmélites, Blanche
- A Streetcar Named Desire, Stella
- La bohème, Musetta
- L'Amour de loin, Clémence
- Die Fledermaus, Rosalinde
- La traviata, Violetta

=== Oratorio and symphonic ===
Bach

- Cantatas (various)
- Christmas Oratorio (Weihnachts-Oratorium), BWV 248
- Easter Oratorio (Oster-Oratorium), BWV 249
- Magnificat, BWV 243
- Masses (various)
- St. John Passion (Johannes-Passion), BWV 245
- St. Matthew Passion (Matthäus-Passion), BWV 244

Barber

- Knoxville: Summer of 1915, Op. 24

Beethoven

- Egmont, Op. 84
- Mass in C major, Op. 86
- Missa Solemnis, Op. 123
- Symphony No. 9, Op. 125

Britten

- Les Illuminations, Op. 18
- Spring Symphony, Op. 44
- War Requiem, Op. 66

Brahms

- Ein deutsches Requiem, Op. 45

Bruckner

- Psalm 150, WAB 38
- Te Deum in C major, WAB 45

Copland

- Eight Songs of Emily Dickinson

Canteloube

- Chants d'Auvergne (Songs of the Auvergne)

Dvořák

- Requiem in B-flat minor, Op. 89, B. 165
- Stabat Mater, Op. 58
- Te Deum, Op. 103

Gounod

- Christmas Oratorio
- St. Cecilia Mass, CG 56

Grieg

- Peer Gynt, Op. 2

Handel

- Dixit Dominus, HWV 232
- Messiah, HWV 56

Haydn

- Mass No. 10 in C, Paukenmesse
- Mass No. 11 in D, Nelsonmesse
- Mass No. 12 in B flat, Theresienmesse
- Mass No. 14 in B flat, Harmoniemesse
- The Creation
- The Seasons

Mahler

- Das klagende Lied
- Symphony No. 2
- Symphony No. 4
- Symphony No. 8

Mendelssohn

- Elijah, Op. 70
- Symphony No. 2 Lobgesang, Op. 52

Messiaen

- Poèmes pour Mi

Mozart

- Concert arias (various)
- Exsultate, jubilate, K. 165
- Mass in C major, K. 257 "Credo"
- Mass in C major, K. 317 "Coronation"
- Great Mass in C minor, K. 427 "The Great Mass"
- Requiem, K. 626

Orff

- Carmina Burana

Pergolesi

- Stabat Mater, P. 77

Poulenc

- Gloria, FP 177
- Stabat Mater, FP 148

Rachmaninoff

- The Bells, Op. 35

Schumann

- Scenes from Goethe's Faust (Paradies und die Peri)

Strauss, Richard

- Orchestral Songs
- Four Last Songs, TrV 296

Szymanowski

- Stabat Mater, Op. 53

Vivaldi

- Gloria, RV 589
- In furore justissime ire, RV 626
- Laudate Pueri, RV 601

=== Recital and chamber music ===
Phillips collaborates with pianists and other instrumentalists for art song recitals and chamber music concerts with a variety of thematic and musical interests.

== Discography ==
- Wasting the Night, Naxos, 2010, CD
- Paysages, Bridge, 2011, CD
- Poul Ruders, Vol. 8, Bridge, 2012, CD
- The Opera America Songbook, Opera America, 2012, CD
- Colors of Feelings, Delos, 2012, CD
- Brass Rail Blues: Music by Patricia Morehead, Navona Records, 2014, CD
- An AIDS Quilt Songbook: Sing for Hope, GPR Records, 2014, CD
- Dear Theo: 3 Song Cycles by Ben Moore, Delos, 2014, CD
- Berg: Violin Concerto, Seven Early Songs, & Three Pieces for Orchestra, SFS Media, 2021, SACD

== Awards and recognition ==
- Operalia International Opera Competition, First Place and the Audience Prize (2005)
- Metropolitan Opera National Council Auditions (2005)
- MacAllister Awards (2005)
- George London Foundation Awards Competition (2005)
- Marilyn Horne Foundation Competition
- American Opera Society Competition
- Musicians Club of Women Chicago
- Sullivan Foundation
- Beverly Sills Award (2010)
- Space Camp Hall of Fame (2015)
