= Charles Sawyer Russell =

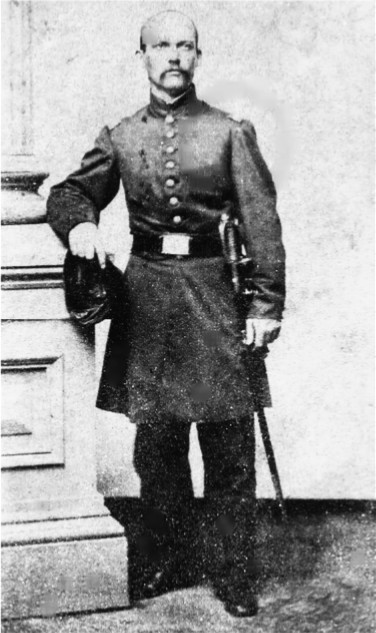
- Charles Sawyer Russell photo taken in 1861
- Born: March 15, 1831; Boston, Massachusetts
- Died: November 2, 1866 (aged 35); Cincinnati, Ohio
- Burial place: Spring Grove Cemetery, Cincinnati, Ohio
- Military career
- Allegiance: United States of America; Union
- Branch: United States Army; Union Army
- Service years: 1861–1865; 1866
- Rank: Colonel; Brevet Brigadier General
- Units: 11th U.S. Infantry Regiment; 20th U.S. Infantry Regiment
- Commands: 28th U.S. Colored Infantry Regiment
- Conflicts: American Civil War: Battle of Antietam; Battle of Chancellorsville; Siege of Petersburg

Charles Sawyer Russell (March 15, 1831 – November 2, 1866) was a United States Army officer in the Union Army during the American Civil War.

== Early life and career ==
Russell was born in Boston, Massachusetts, in 1831, the son of John Brooks Russell, a publisher and seed dealer, and his wife, Mary Hicks Sawyer. In 1855, he married Annie Stretcher of Indianapolis, Indiana, and relocated to that state. They had two daughters: Annie Bell Russell and Caroline Russell (who married David Bispham in 1885).

== Civil War service ==
At the beginning of the Civil War in 1861, Russell was a sergeant (April 19) and then quickly a captain (May 14) in the 11th U.S. Infantry Regiment, and was stationed to Fort Independence in Boston. He was mustered out of the volunteer service on June 30.

Russell was brevetted to major for his participation at the Battle of Antietam on September 17, 1862, and brevetted to lieutenant colonel on May 3, 1863 for meritorious service at the Battle of Chancellorsville.

Russell was promoted to lieutenant colonel on May 1, 1864, and organized and led the 28th U.S. Colored Infantry Regiment, the only black unit from the state of Indiana. He and his men participated in the Siege of Petersburg in Virginia, and the 28th lost half its men in the Battle of the Crater that July. Russell was appointed a brevet colonel for the Battle of the Crater, and to brigadier general for Cemetery Hill, both effective from July 30.

He was promoted to colonel on August 27, 1864, and given brigade command in the IX Corps in the Army of the Potomac from September until October. He then was transferred to the Army of the James that winter and commanded several brigades in the Army's XXV Corps from December 3 to February 27, 1865.

Leading the 28th, he was among the first to enter Richmond after it fell to Federal forces in early April 1865. The regiment was mustered out of the volunteer service on November 8, 1865, in Texas, and returned to Indianapolis for a public reception held on January 8, 1866. Russell was then transferred to the 20th U.S. Infantry Regiment in September 1866. He moved with the regiment to Cincinnati, Ohio, where he died in a cholera outbreak that struck the regiment that November. He is buried in Spring Grove Cemetery in Cincinnati.

== See also ==
- List of American Civil War brevet generals
