= Lisa Roma =

American opera singer

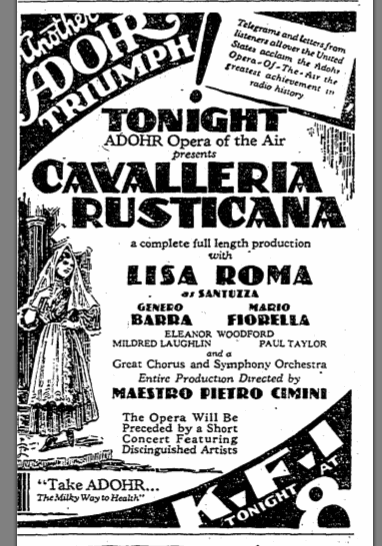
Advertisement for a live radio broadcast featuring Lisa Roma, published in the Los Angeles Times on May 6, 1930

Lisa Roma (1892–1965) was an American soprano who toured in the United States with composer Maurice Ravel in 1928. She was chair of grand opera in the College of Music at the University of Southern California in Los Angeles beginning in 1930. Later, she was owner of Musical Courier magazine.

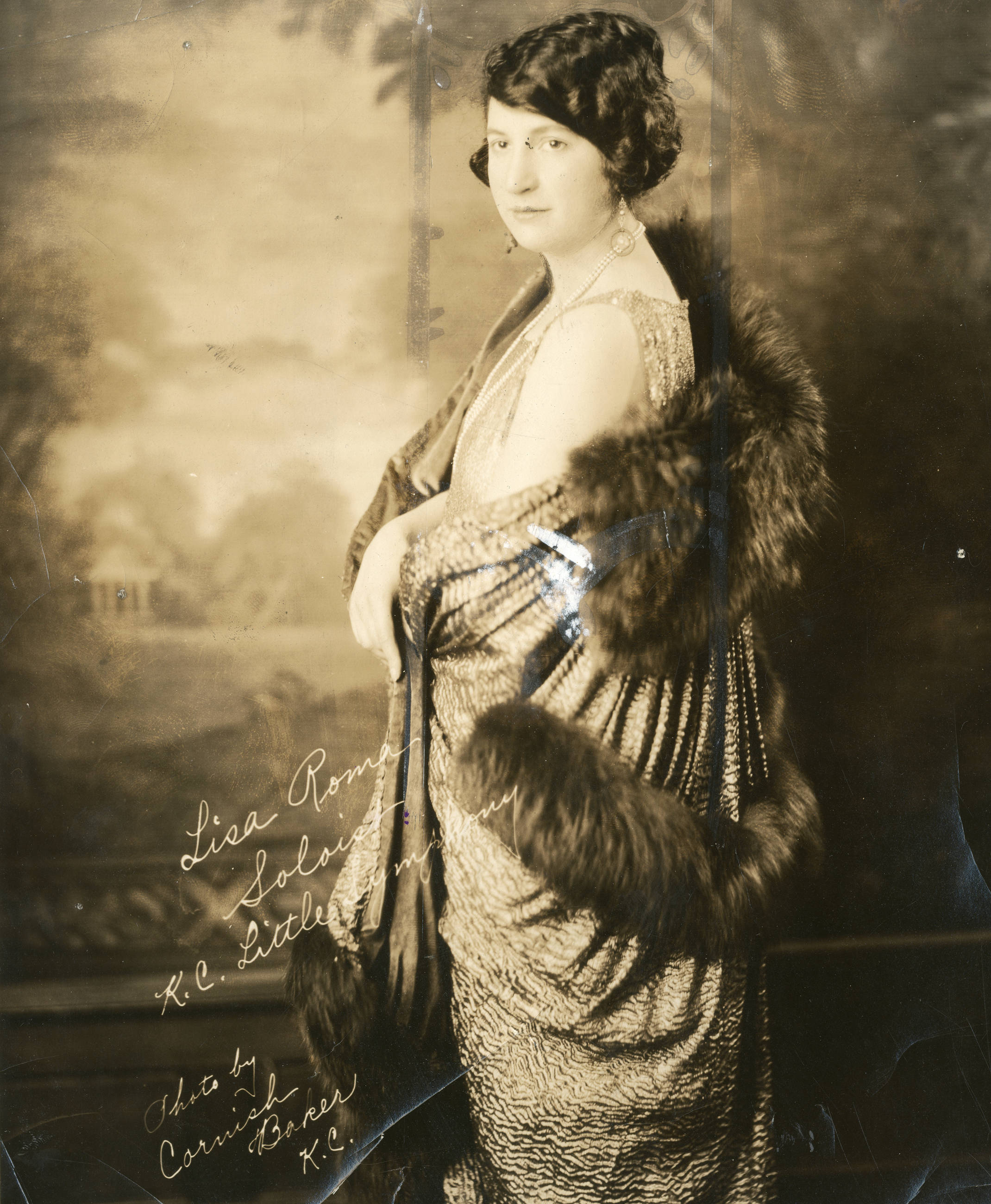

== Early life ==
Roma was born on February 29, 1892, in Philadelphia to "well-to-do, musical — but not professional — parents." In 1917 her mother and father died, three months apart, leaving Lisa and six siblings. She became an accountant and found time to study music, tennis, fencing and dancing, all of which she taught to others. Eventually she became a soloist for the Philadelphia Choral Society, then was a student of David Bispham, the first American operatic baritone to win an international reputation. Roma also studied with Trabadello in Paris and Max von Schillings in Berlin.

== Debut ==
Roma debuted with Victor Herbert. In 1920, during a concert with Herbert at Willow Grove Park near Philadelphia, Roma was called out of the chorale to substitute as the lead in Naughty Marietta: The featured singer from the Metropolitan Opera had developed laryngitis.

[Roma] had passed a trying day. Up very early . . . she had gone over her vocal technique, then prepared breakfast for her six brothers and sisters. At nine, she had been at her desk . . . At noon, she had snatched a bit of lunch and hurried to the roof of the large business block, where she served as tennis and fencing instructor to the employees. . . . Then for an hour before dinner, she gave a vocal lesson to a group of music teachers. . . . At the appointed hour she had donned her choral robes and was in her seat. . . . Under her choral gown, she wore a simple office dress — all she had. [After Roma was summoned by Herbert to take the role, someone] was found who would lend her evening dress, and the exchange was made. . . . At the close of the remarkable performance, Victor Herbert took her hand and drew her up on the block beside him. . . . The audience burst into a new round of acclaim.

When singing in Washington, D.C., with Beniamino Gigli, she was invited to sing in the White House. Traveling to Germany, she was engaged at the Berlin State Opera, where, once again, the scheduled star was taken ill and Roma was asked to sing in her place — the role of Mimi in Puccini's La Boheme. She was thereupon engaged as a guest artist for the 1925 season.

Lisa Roma, before (rear) and after (front) her rhinoplasty. Los Angeles Examiner photo

In 1930, she made a tour of Europe "as interpreter for the famous French composer, Maurice Ravel." She was granted a master of music degree in spring 1930 by the University of Southern California, and in the fall she was appointed to the new chair of grand opera in the USC Department of Music.

== Personal ==
Roma was one of the first people in the entertainment industry to undergo a rhinoplasty, or a "nose job." According to the Los Angeles Examiner (May 5, 1930), the operation was performed in expectation that she would appear in the "talkies" as a singer.

Roma was married to David Trompeter, industrialist and inventor. From 1958 to 1961 she was the owner and publisher of the Musical Courier magazine, and was the author of three books about singing. She died February 17, 1965, in Greenwich, Connecticut. Besides her husband, she was survived by siblings Herman, Guy, Ethel and Tillie.
