= Dagmar Pecková =

Czech operatic mezzo-soprano (born 1961)

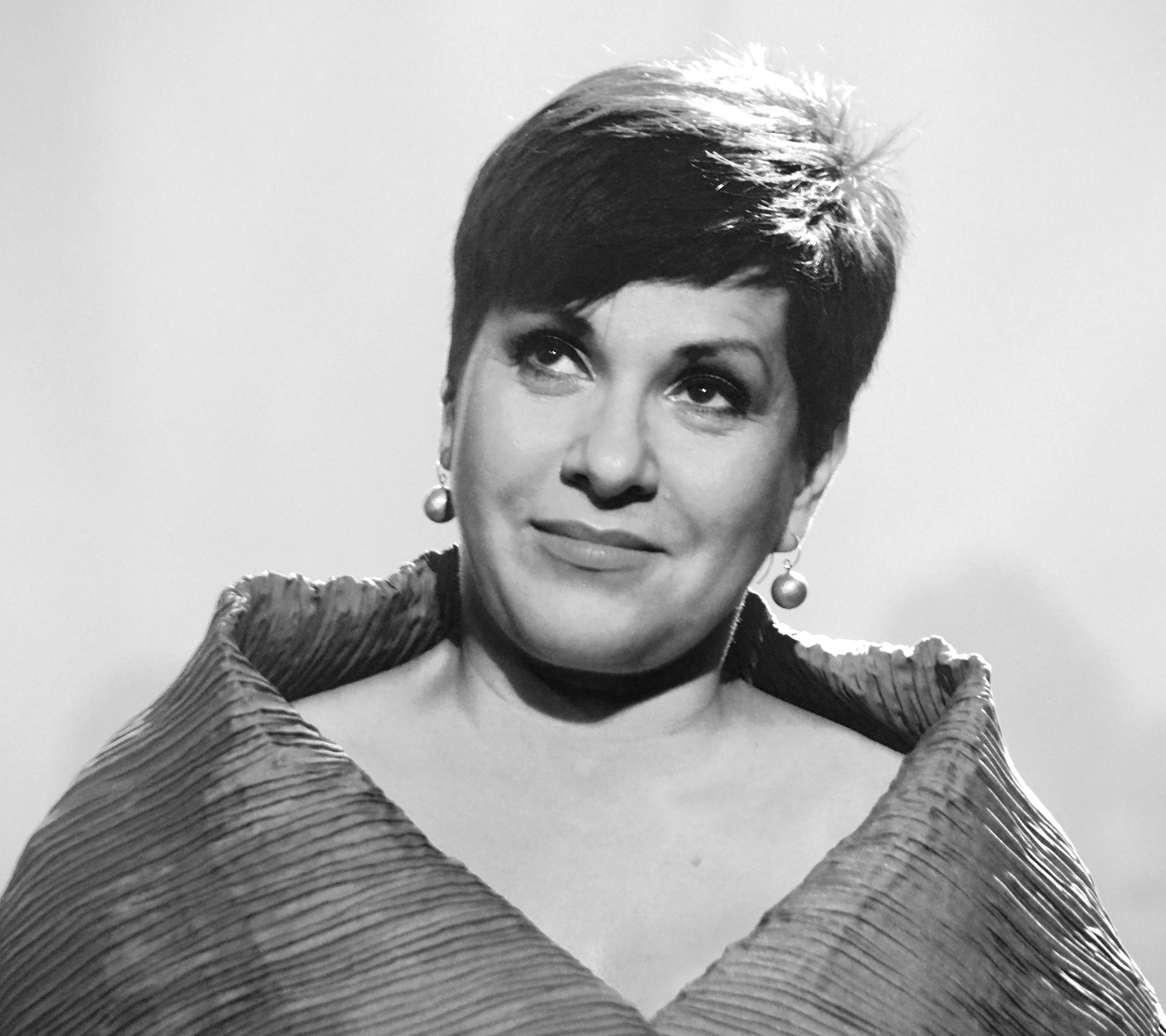
- Dagmar Pecková in 2014

Background information
- Born: 4 April 1961 (age 64); Chrudim, Czechoslovakia
- Genres: Opera
- Occupation: Singer
- Instrument: Vocals
- Website: dagmarpeckova.com

Dagmar Pecková (born 4 April 1961) is a Czech operatic mezzo-soprano.

Born in the Medlešice district of Chrudim, Pecková studied singing at the Prague Conservatory. She then became part of the young artist's program at the Semperoper in Dresden in 1985. After two years in the program she was made a principal artist at that house in 1987. In 1988 she was appointed to the Berlin State Opera where she was a principal artist for many years. She has also been highly active as a guest artist on the international stage, performing with such companies as the Bavarian State Opera, De Nederlandse Opera, the Deutsche Oper Berlin, the Edinburgh Festival, the Hamburg State Opera, the Liceu, the Opéra National de Paris, the Prague National Theatre, the Royal Opera, London, the San Francisco Opera, the Théâtre des Champs-Élysées, and the Zurich Opera among others. In 2000 she portrayed the role of the Pilgrim in the world premiere of Kaija Saariaho's L'amour de loin at the Salzburg Festival.

In 1995 the asteroid 18460 Pecková was named after her and in 1999 she received a Thalia Award. She has made a number of recordings on the Supraphon label, including a disc of Mozart arias, a disc of songs by Mahler and Berio, and a complete recording of the role of Varvara in Leoš Janáček's Káťa Kabanová. She currently lives in Heuweiler, Germany with her husband Klaus Schiesser, a German musician.

== Decorations ==
Awarded by Czech Republic

- Medal of Merit (2024)
