= David Bispham =

American opera singer (1857–1921)

David Scull Bispham
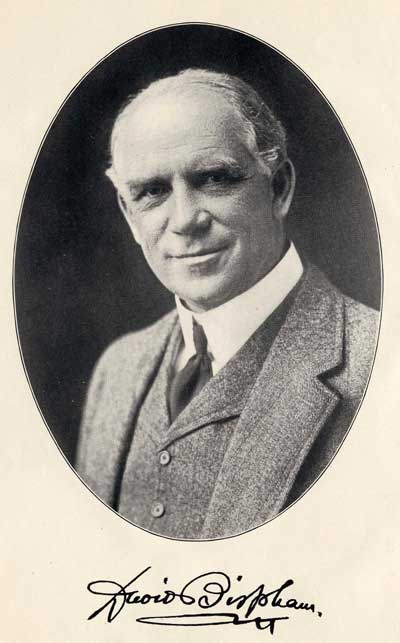
- Born: January 5, 1857; Philadelphia, Pennsylvania, U.S.
- Died: November 2, 1921 (aged 64); Manhattan, New York, U.S.
- Resting place: Laurel Hill Cemetery, Philadelphia, Pennsylvania, U.S.
- Education: Haverford College (1876)
- Spouse: Caroline Russell Bispham
- Children: Leonie Anne Francesca Carnegie Bispham

David Scull Bispham (January 5, 1857 – October 2, 1921) was an American operatic baritone.

== Biography ==
Bispham was born on January 5, 1857, in Philadelphia, the only child of William Danforth Bispham and Jane Lippincott Scull. Both of Bispham's parents were members of the Society of Friends. In 1867, the family relocated to Moorestown Township, New Jersey. In 1872, Bispham entered Haverford College, from which he was graduated in 1876. After graduation, Bispham entered the wool business with his mother's brothers, all the while continuing to develop his musical talents as an amateur. Bispham appeared in numerous musical performances in his childhood despite having no formal musical training.

In 1885, Bispham married Caroline Russell, the daughter of General Charles Sawyer Russell. They would go on to have four children: Jeanette, Vida, Leonie, and David. The Bisphams honeymooned in Europe, and when they returned to Philadelphia, Bispham found work with the Lehigh Valley Railroad. While employed with the railroad, Bispham spent his spare time singing with local clubs and an Episcopal church choir in Philadelphia.

=== Early music career ===
At twenty-eight he went to Europe, studying singing in Florence with Luigi Vannuccini, and in Milan with Francesco Lamperti. He also studied in Bayreuth. In 1891 he was selected from among fifty applicants to perform the role of the Duc de Longueville in a London performance of André Messager's La Basoche; this marked his first professional appearance on any stage.

=== Covent Garden ===
He was engaged by the Royal Opera at Covent Garden to sing the part of Beckmesser in Wagner's Die Meistersinger von Nürnberg in June 1892. This production was also to feature Jean de Reszke, Emma Albani, and Jean Lassalle in the other leading roles. De Reszke fell ill during rehearsals, and the production had to be cancelled. On the day of the cancellation, however, Bispham was asked to substitute on the following day as Kurwenal in Richard Wagner's Tristan und Isolde, under Gustav Mahler. This was Bispham's first Wagner role. According to his memoir, referred to below, Bispham had previously learned that role and several others following the advice of a medium at a seance. His success there brought him a contract for Covent Garden, where he appeared, primarily in Wagnerian roles, for all but two of the next ten seasons.

=== American career ===
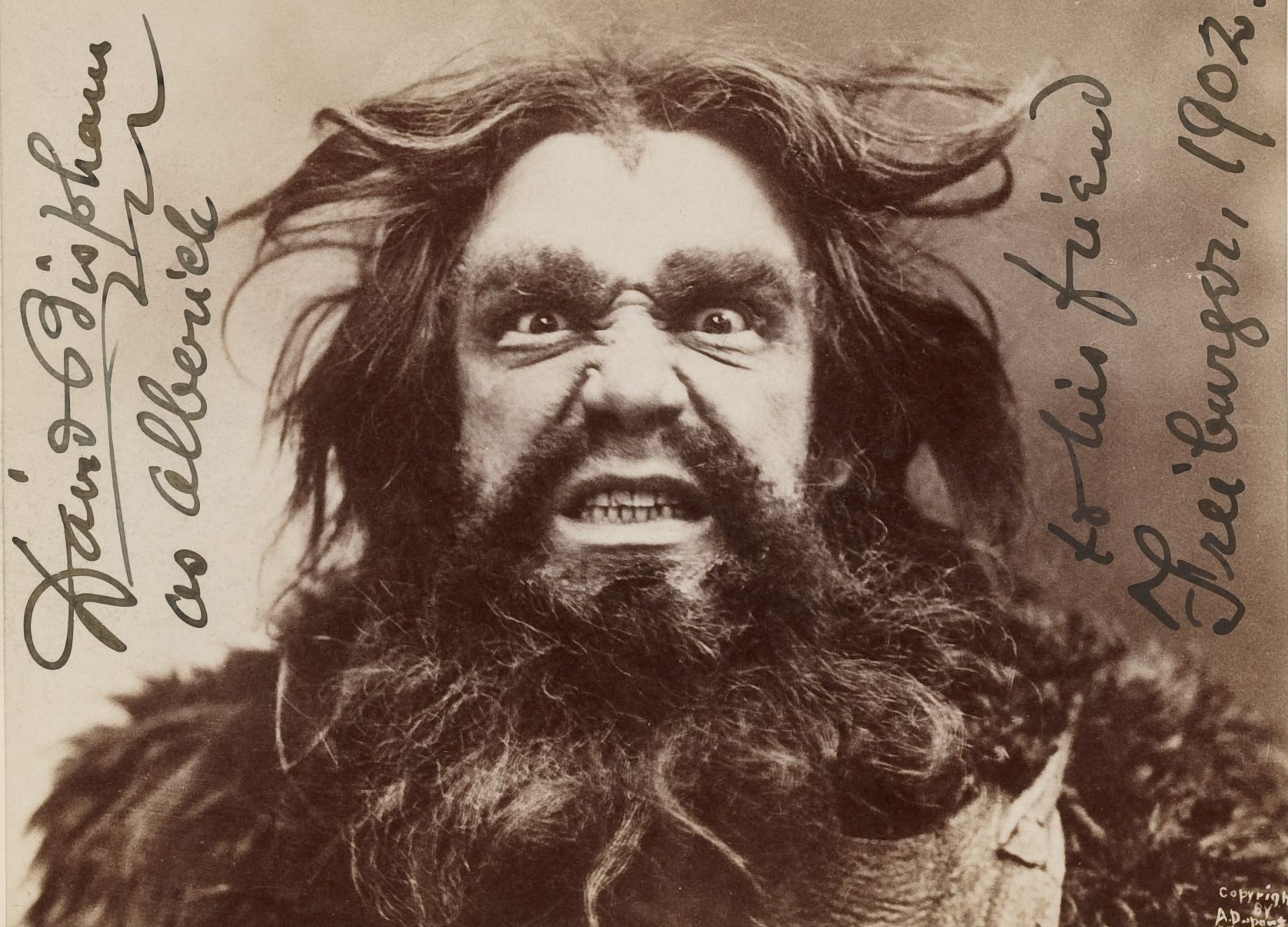
David Bispham as Alberich in Siegfried, circa 1902

Bispham made his American debut, once again in Wagner, at the Metropolitan Opera in New York City on November 18, 1896; that night he sang the role of Sixtus Beckmesser in Die Meistersinger von Nürnberg. He remained with the company until 1903, singing mainly Wagnerian roles; he also appeared in the American premieres of Ignace Paderewski's Manru and Ethel Smyth's Der Wald. Bispham was influential in establishing the career of Carrie Jacobs-Bond as in 1901 he gave a recital exclusively featuring her songs in Chicago's Studebaker Theatre. After 1903 Bispham's operatic appearances were few, and he devoted most of his time to recitals, with which he had much success. He made a point of singing English versions of songs by such composers as Ludwig van Beethoven, Franz Schubert, and Robert Schumann.

In 1916 he appeared in an English-language version of Wolfgang Amadeus Mozart's Der Schauspieldirektor in New York. The performance was such a success that it led to the formation of the Society of American Singers; the company, with Bispham's inspiration, gave three seasons of light operas in English. Bispham's commitment to opera in English also led, after his death, to the creation of the Bispham Memorial Medal Award, to be awarded to operas in English by American composers. He was a 'strong' advocate for performing vocal music in the audience's language.

He was a close personal friend of American soprano Lillian Nordica, with whom he travelled to Australia on her last tour before her death. He was also a frequent professional colleague of both De Reszke brothers (Jean and Edouard), Olive Fremstad, Ernestine Schumann-Heink and Dame Clara Butt, among singers, and Hans Richter, Arthur Nikisch, Felix Mottl, Anton Seidl and Walter Damrosch, among conductors. Damrosch's setting of Rudyard Kipling's "Danny Deever", as sung by Bispham, became a favorite of President Theodore Roosevelt.

Bispham was the first singer to introduce Brahms's Four Serious Songs and Magelone Lieder to American audiences in the 1896-97 concert season. Bispham also sang Horatio Parker's oratorio, Hora Novissima, in 1897 (with Johanna Gadski, Gertrude May Stein, and Evan Williams as the other soloists). Upon his immediate return to Great Britain, he provided a copy of the score to Hans Richter, which led to the premiere of the piece in Worcester, England, and the Festival of the Three Choirs.

In 1902, Bispham began teaching singing in Philadelphia.

In 1908, he was awarded national honorary membership in Phi Mu Alpha Sinfonia.

When Carrie Jacobs-Bond published "A Perfect Day" in 1910 she added the header "As sung by Mr. David Bispham" above the title (the header appears on p. 3 of the sheet music). Jacobs-Bond wrote "A Perfect Day" (q.v.) in 1909 and first published it in 1910. Bispham also performed “Elaine” by Ada Weigel Powers several times.

In 1915, Nelson Eddy, future baritone and actor, began studying singing under Bispham in Philadelphia.

=== Death ===
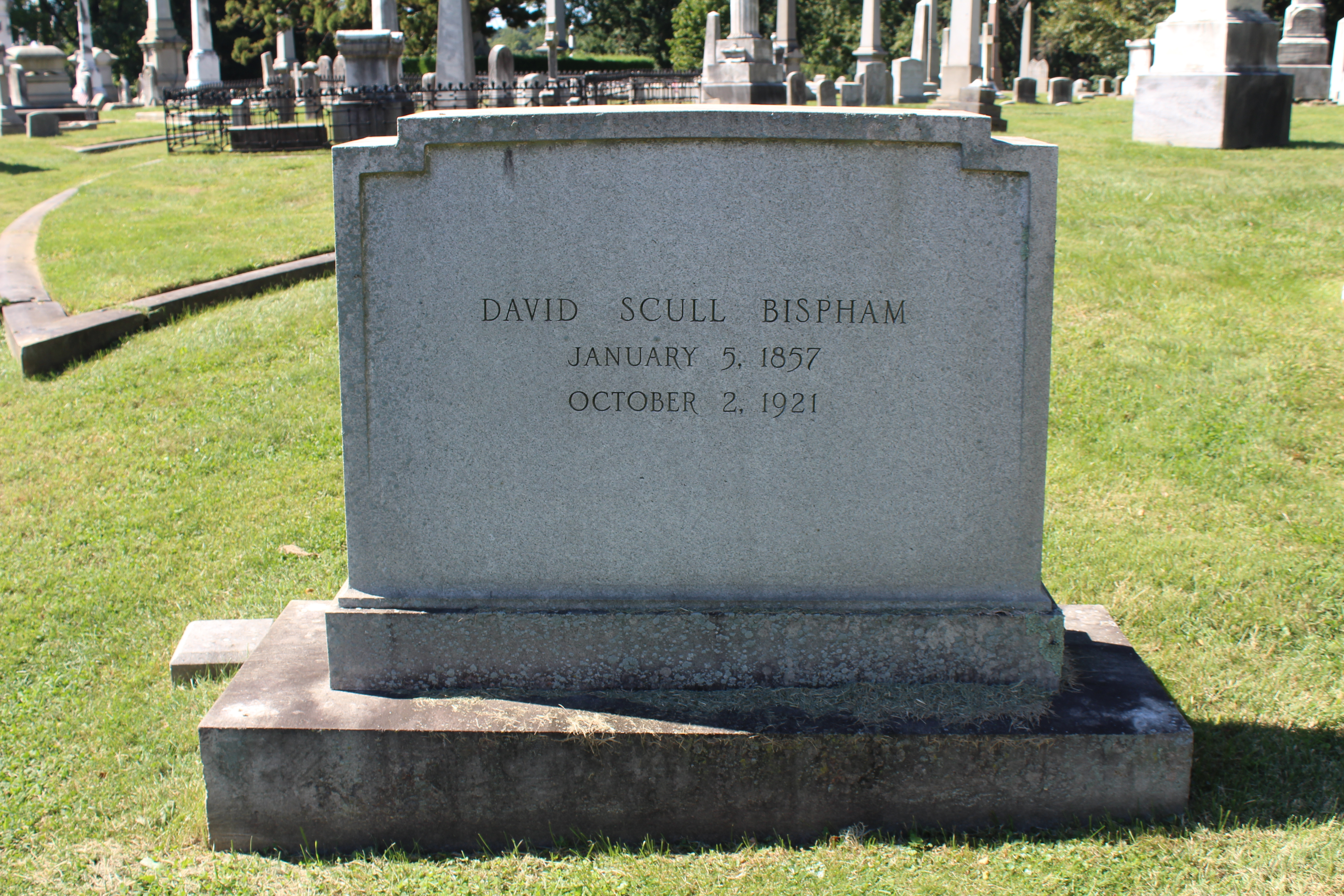
David Bispham tombstone in Laurel Hill Cemetery

Bispham died in Manhattan, New York City on October 2, 1921. He was buried in Philadelphia's Laurel Hill Cemetery. His widow and daughter challenged his will in probate court alleging that there was undue influence. They lost their suit: $75,000 of an $100,000 trust fund was left to his widow and two daughters, while $25,000 was left to Mrs. Henrietta M. Ten Eyck, to establish a memorial fund.

== Legacy ==
He wrote a memoir of his professional career called A Quaker Singer's Recollections, published by Macmillan in January 1920. Although it makes no mention whatsoever of his personal life, his marriage, or his children, the book is a valuable insight into the life and times of the international opera singer of his day and source of much first-hand information regarding the state of the vocal art and especially a singer's repertoire of the era.

His legacy lives on in the form of gramophone recordings of songs and arias, some of which have been reissued on CD. He also paved the way for such outstanding American baritones of later generations as Clarence Whitehill, Richard Bonelli, Arthur Endreze, John Charles Thomas, Lawrence Tibbett, Leonard Warren and Robert Merrill.

The David Bispham Memorial Medal was awarded by the American Opera Society of Chicago, from 1924 through 1955, to promote the composition and performance of American opera.

== See also ==
- Lisa Roma, one of his students, soprano and music educator
