= Agnieszka Sławińska =

Polish soprano

Agnieszka Sławińska is a Polish operatic soprano.

== Life ==
Born in Warsaw, Slawińska began by studying piano and violin at the Białystok School of Music, until 1997, and then studied singing at the Academy of Music in Łódź, with Leonard Mroz. She was a finalist in the International Singing Competition of Pamplona (Spain), whose jury was chaired by José Carreras.

During her studies, she made her debut with the role of Cherubino at the Łódź Opera in Le nozze di Figaro. After graduation, she was engaged by the Nova Opera in Bydgoszcz and then she started postgraduate studies in the Opera Studio at the Opéra National du Rhin in Strasbourg.

She has performed on several occasions, including in Bern as Fiordiligi et Pamina in The Magic Flute in a production by Peter Brook. She has sung the role of Pamina on stages in Milan, London, Lincoln Center Festival in New York, Luxembourg, Madrid, Amsterdam, Barcelona and Canada. Her repertoire includes the roles of Micaëla in Carmen, Ilia in Idomeneo (Opéra National du Rhin), Fiordiligi in Cosi fan tutte, Pamina, Musetta in La Bohème (ONR), Liù in Turandot, Lauretta in Gianni Schicchi by Puccini, Juliette in Romeo et Juliette by Gounod and Kristine in Julie by P. Boesmans, Mariana in Das Liebesverbot by Wagner at the Opéra du Rhin with Constantin Trinks, the title-role in Chimène by Sacchini with l’Arcal et le Concert de la Loge à Paris, Les Troyens by Berlioz à Strasbourg (recorded by Warner Classics with John Nelson and Joyce DiDonato), the soprano part in the Missa Solemnis by Beethoven with Eric Delson and the Ensemble Orchestral de Bruxelles.

Recent and future commitments include, Mariana in Das Liebesverbot by Wagner at the Wrocław Opera, Donna Anna in Don Giovanni by Mozart and Marguerite in Faust by Gounod at the Wrocław Opera and also Clémence in L'Amour de loin by Kaija Saariaho in the Palacio de Bellas Artes in Mexico with José Areán.
