= Der Wald =

1902 opera

- Opera by Ethel Smyth
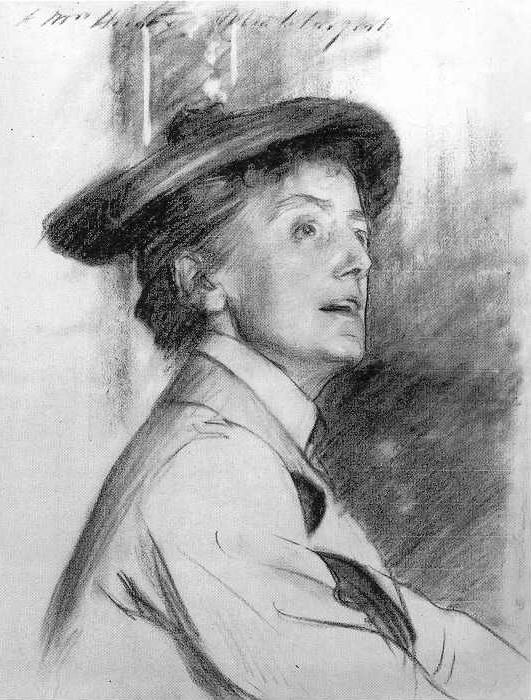
- Ethel Smyth, portrayed by John Singer Sargent in 1901
- Translation: The Forest
- Librettist: Ethel Smyth; Henry Bennet Brewster
- Language: German
- Premiere: 9 April 1902; Königliches Schauspielhaus, Berlin

Der Wald (The Forest) is an opera in one act by Ethel Smyth to a German libretto by Henry Brewster and Smyth, written between 1899 and 1901. It was Smyth's second opera and it was first performed on 9 April 1902 at the Königliches Schauspielhaus in Berlin.

== Performance history ==
At its Berlin premiere it has been noted that the reception was "lukewarm at best", but it was given performances sung in English at the Royal Opera House in London. It was also given in Strasbourg in February 1904, after which it disappeared, "Smyth abandon[ing] Der Wald and the entire proto-Wagnerian genre."

Smyth had hopes of seeing her opera presented in America. After her arrival in New York, she gave an interview to New York World in which she stated:

I have always thought if I did anything worthwhile I should like to see it presented in America. From what I have heard, I hold in regard American treatment and receptivity and shall await American judgment eagerly.

There followed, in an interview in New York with the Evening Sun, a description of how she achieved her goal:

She had crossed the Channel overnight [from London] to catch the Metropolitan's manager, Maurice Grau, in Paris. She reached Paris at 7 in the morning, phoned Grau's hotel at 8, pleading that she had to catch the boat-train home at 11. Catch it she did, signed contract in hand. "I told him it was one act long and could fit on any sort of bill, in any kind of house." She brought clippings and box office statements from the record-setting London premiere with her. "You are certainly a businesslike woman", Grau said.

Smyth's opera was presented in German at the Metropolitan Opera on 11 March 1903 with Johanna Gadski, Luise Reuss-Belce, David Bispham and Eugène Dufriche, conducted by Alfred Hertz, Der Wald was followed by Verdi's Il trovatore. Yohalem notes that "it was canny of impresario Maurice Grau to use a brilliantly-cast Trovatore with Lillian Nordica, Louise Homer, Emilio De Marchi, Giuseppe Campanari and Marcel Journet as bait to lure an audience to the new work." Der Wald was a popular and financial success for the Met, although critical reaction was not uniformly positive. A second performance, given on 20 March with the same cast, was paired with La fille du régiment with Marcella Sembrich, and the pairing earned more than La fille had done during the previous year when it was presented alongside Pagliacci.

Der Wald remained the only opera by a woman composer to be performed at the Metropolitan Opera until 2016 when Kaija Saariaho's opera L'Amour de loin was first performed there.

The premiere recording of Der Wald, sung in English, was released by Resonus Classics in September 2023 with the BBC Singers, BBC Symphony Orchestra, soloists Natalya Romaniw, Claire Barnett-Jones, Robert Murray, Morgan Pearse, Andrew Shore, Matthew Brook, conducted by John Andrews.

In 2025 the opera was staged in the UK for the first time in over 100 years at the Guildhall School of Music and Drama in a production directed by Stephen Barlow (director). It was paired with the UK premiere of Ottorino Respighi's Lucrezia (opera)

== Roles ==
Roles, voice types, premiere cast
Role	Voice type	Premiere cast, 2 April 1902 Conductor: Karl Muck
Landgrave Rudolf	baritone	Carl Nebe
Iolanthe, his mistress	soprano or mezzo-soprano	Ida Hiedler
Heinrich, a young woodcutter	tenor	Ernst Kraus
Peter, a woodman	bass	
Röschen his daughter, betrothed to Heinrich	soprano	Marie Dietrich
A Peddler, with a bear	baritone	
Peasants, Huntsmen, Chorus of Wood Spirits

== Synopsis ==
Smyth describes the story of her opera:

It is a short and tragic story of paradox framed in the tranquility and unendingness of nature, represented by the forest and its spirits. As the curtain rises, these spirits or elemental forces, under the aspect of nymphs and hamadryads, are seen engaged in ritual observations round an altar in the wood. Unshackled by time, they sing their own eternity and the brevity of things human. They fade away, the altar disappears, and the play begins.

A peasant girl, Röschen, is engaged to a young woodcutter, Heinrich. The ... wedding is fixed for the following day. A peddler sells his wares. There is general jollity and the peasants dance. In the distance the horn of Iolanthe sounds. The merriment ceases; terror-stricken, the peasants fly...

Iolanthe is a woman of cruel instincts and unbridled passions, supposed to be a witch, and dreaded with superstitious fear. She has complete sway over Count Rudolf, the liege lord of the country. Struck by Heinrich's good looks, she tries to make him enter into her service at the castle...

Her fascinations fail, however, to prevail over Heinrich's love for Röschen. She seeks the revenge of the scorned woman. The peddler denounces Heinrich as the slayer of a deer..., and this gives to Iolanthe a chance to compel the young woodcutter to obey or to punish him for his indifference. Heinrich ... prefers life which is deathless and mighty to life which is weak and brief... Iolanthe gives the word and Heinrich is slain.

The scene changes back to its first appearance, and the Spirits of the Wood take up their ritual where it was interrupted by the incursion of things transient.

== Critical reactions ==
Overall, the New York critics disliked the opera, although some noted her technical skill. However, Yohalem notes "whether the music evidenced 'femininity' was a matter of no little disagreement" and he goes on to quote The Telegraph's review:

This little woman writes music with a masculine hand and has a sound and logical brain, such as is supposed to be the especial gift of the rougher sex. There is not a weak or effeminate note in Der Wald, nor an unstable sentiment." In contrast, The Daily Mail dissented: "The charm and quaintness of it will appeal more than its attempt to mirror intense human emotion and to this extent it is feminine, according to all tradition."

But, as Yohalem comments, "the most enthusiastic account comes from The Telegraph":

The cause of woman took an immense stride forward last night... [I]f the composer has more like it, in manuscript or in contemplation, it is to be hoped that she will turn them over to Heinrich Conried [the Met's incoming impresario], and so brighten his first year of tenancy at the Metropolitan... ... Although of but a single act, is one of the most ambitious compositions of the last decade. Its loftiness of purpose and seriousness of design are supplemented by a wealth of musical ideas, and a skill of construction which result in a strongly rounded whole... Since Richard Wagner gave individuality to German opera, this one comes nearest embodying the spirit of the school.

In regard to the quality of the music, The Telegraph continues:

Miss Smyth's ... harmonic scheme is elaborate, masterly and convincing. She has an excellent sense of tone color, and a deft and confident way of applying it. She is not afraid to use the brass and heavy strings, her climaxes are strongly developed, and her fortissimo passages are of great quality and body...

In contrast, The New York Times was not at all enthusiastic:

The case is one of vaulting ambitions and a general incompetency to write anything beyond the most obvious commonplaces. It is quite lacking in dramatic expressiveness in characterization, in melodic ideas, in distinction of any kind. ... In the love scenes ... it is entirely unconvincing, and exhibits neither passion nor tenderness ... There is little that is either grateful or effective for the solo singers.
