= 28th United States Colored Infantry Regiment =

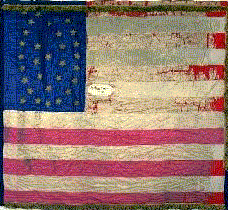
- Regimental Flag
- Active: December 24, 1863 – November 8, 1865
- Country: United States
- Allegiance: United States of America; Union
- Branch: Infantry
- Engagements: American Civil War: Siege of Petersburg; Battle of the Crater

Commanders
- Colonel of the Regiment: Charles Sawyer Russell

The 28th United States Colored Infantry, also called the 28th Indiana Infantry (Colored),^{1} was an African American infantry regiment from the state of Indiana that fought in the American Civil War.

== History ==
On November 30, 1863, the United States Department of War authorized Indiana Governor Oliver P. Morton to raise one regiment of infantry composed of African Americans. On December 3, the state's adjutant general issued orders to begin accepting enlistments, which began December 24. On January 12, 1864, the War Department notified Morton that the regiment would be called the "28th Regiment of U.S. Colored Troops."

Reverend Willis Revels and Garland H. White, both ministers of the African Methodist Episcopal Church in Indianapolis, Indiana was the chief recruiting officer. Recruits trained until the end of March at a camp established on land owned by Calvin Fletcher, a prominent citizen. The camp was named "Camp Fremont" in honor of John C. Frémont, the 1856 Republican presidential nominee and Union army general.

Placed in charge of the newly formed unit was Charles Sawyer Russell, a captain of the 11th U.S. Infantry Regiment who was (on 1 May 1864) appointed Lieutenant Colonel and battalion commander of the six organized companies. On April 25, the six companies of the 28th left Indianapolis for Washington, D.C., where they were attached to the capital's defenses.

The 28th sustained heavy casualties in the Battle of the Crater at the Siege of Petersburg, Virginia, on July 30, 1864, when nearly half of its soldiers were killed or wounded. William Fox (see references) put the 28th's losses at 11 killed, 64 wounded and 13 missing, a total of 88. Following the Battle of the Crater, the depleted ranks of the 28th were filled with four more companies of recruits raised in Indiana and sent to make the command a full regiment. The commander, Lieutenant Colonel Russell, was reappointed as the regimental commander with the rank of Colonel on 23 August 1864. Russell was also brevetted Brigadier General on 30 July 1864 in recognition of the 28th's performance at The Crater.

After the Confederate surrender at Appomattox, the 28th was moved to the Mexican border in Texas as part of the American response to the French intervention in Mexico.

The 28th was formally mustered out in Corpus Christi, Texas on November 8, 1865. It returned to Indianapolis January 6, 1866, to a reception in its honor. According to Frederick H. Dyer (see references), the regiment suffered a total of 212 fatalities: two officers and 45 enlistees killed and mortally wounded in combat and one officer and 164 enlistees who died of disease.

An Indiana state historical marker commemorating the regiment was erected in Indianapolis in 2004.

== Service ==
- Organized December 24, 1863
- Battle of the Crater at the Siege of Petersburg, Virginia, on July 30, 1864
- Moved to the Mexican border in Texas as part of the American response to the French intervention in Mexico
- Mustered out on November 8, 1865

== See also ==
- United States Colored Troops
- List of United States Colored Troops Civil War Units

== Notes ==
- The regiment is distinct from the 28th Regiment Indiana Volunteers, which was the infantry designation assigned to the 1st Regiment Indiana Cavalry.
