= Stanisław Sławiński =

Deputy Minister of National Education
- In office 11 May 2006 – 10 December 2007
- In office 6 December 2005 – 6 May 2006

Personal details
- Born: 1948 (age 77–78)
- Education: Warsaw Theological Academy
- Profession: University lecturer

Stanisław Sławiński (born 1948) is a Polish university lecturer and public figure.

He earned a doctorate at the Faculty of Christian Philosophy of the Warsaw Theological Academy. From 2003 to 2005 Sławiński was the deputy director of the Education Office of Warsaw. He was the Deputy Minister of National Education during the premierships of Kazimierz Marcinkiewicz and Jarosław Kaczyński. He is currently a lecturer at the Cardinal Stefan Wyszyński University in Warsaw. Sławiński authored several books about pedagogy, including two on education reform.

== Bibliography ==
- Stanisław Sławiński — Społeczny Monitor Informacji
