= Constantin Trinks =

German conductor

Constantin Trinks (born 9 April 1975) is a German conductor.

== Life ==
Born in Karlsruhe, Trinks studied piano with Günter Reinhold at the Hochschule für Musik Karlsruhe and conducting with Wolf-Dieter Hauschild. While still a student, Trinks worked as répétiteur and personal assistant to Kazushi Ōno at the Badisches Staatstheater Karlsruhe before becoming a permanent solo répétiteur and Kapellmeister there in 2000. In 2002, he was Christian Thielemann's guest conductor for the Bayreuth Festival's new production of Tannhäuser. In the same year, he moved to the Saarbrücken Theatre as 2nd Kapellmeister, with which he remained associated until 2009, from 2006 to 2009 as acting general music director. From 2009 to 2012, he was general music director at the Staatstheater Darmstadt. Since 2012 Trinks has been a freelance conductor. He regularly appears as a conductor at opera houses in Europe and the world: Komische Oper Berlin, New National Theatre Tokyo, Semperoper Dresden, Opéra National de Paris, Bayerische Staatsoper München, Oper Frankfurt, Hamburgische Staatsoper, Deutsche Oper Berlin, Opéra National du Rhin Strasbourg.

== Repertoire ==
During his tenure in Karlsruhe and Darmstadt, Trinks acquired a broad opera and concert repertoire from the 18th to the 20th century. His conducting of Luigi Nono's Intolleranza 1960 in Saarbrücken in the following years enable him to establish himself as a proven Strauss and Wagner conductor. Particular milestones in this development were conductions of Der fliegende Holländer (Saarbrücken 2004), Das Rheingold (Saarbrücken 2006), Parsifal (Darmstadt 2008), Lohengrin (Saarbrücken 2008), Die Meistersinger von Nürnberg (Darmstadt 2008), Salome (Saarbrücken 2009), Der Rosenkavalier (Dresden 2010 Munich 2011), Der Ring des Nibelungen (Darmstadt 2011), Ariadne auf Naxos (Hamburg 2012), Tannhäuser (Berlin 2012). Particularly in the Wagner field, Trinks was able to consolidate his reputation as an outstanding conductor of the German repertoire. In July 2013 he conducted Wagner's Jugendwerk Das Liebesverbot in Bayreuth He made his debut at the Theater an der Wien in 2015 with Heinrich Marschner's Hans Heiling. In 2024 he conducts Mozart's The Magic Flute at the Glyndebourne Festival Opera.
