= Musicians Club of New York =

- Abbreviation: MCNY
- Formation: December 4, 1911; 114 years ago
- Merger of: American International Music Fund, Inc (1979)
- Type: Non-profit organization
- Legal status: 501(c)(3)
- Headquarters: New York, New York
- Location: United States
- Official language: English
- President: Brian Hunter
- Past presidents: Arthur Bergh, David Bispham, Joseph H. Conlin, Walter Damrosch, Norman Dello Joio, Henry Kimball Hadley, John Tasker Howard, Olga Koussevitzky, Frank La Forge, Tali Esen Morgan
- Website: www.musiciansclubofny.org

The Musicians Club of New York is a musicians' club based in New York City. It was founded in 1911 with the intent of providing a social platform for musicians in and around New York, but its mission later expanded to support and promote young musicians through prizes and scholarships, as well as provide recognition for contemporary composers. From 1979 it administered the Koussevitzky International Recording Award (KIRA), and since 1956 has presented the Young Artist Awards, now known as the Serge and Olga Koussevitzky Young Artist Awards.

== History ==
=== Founding and early years ===
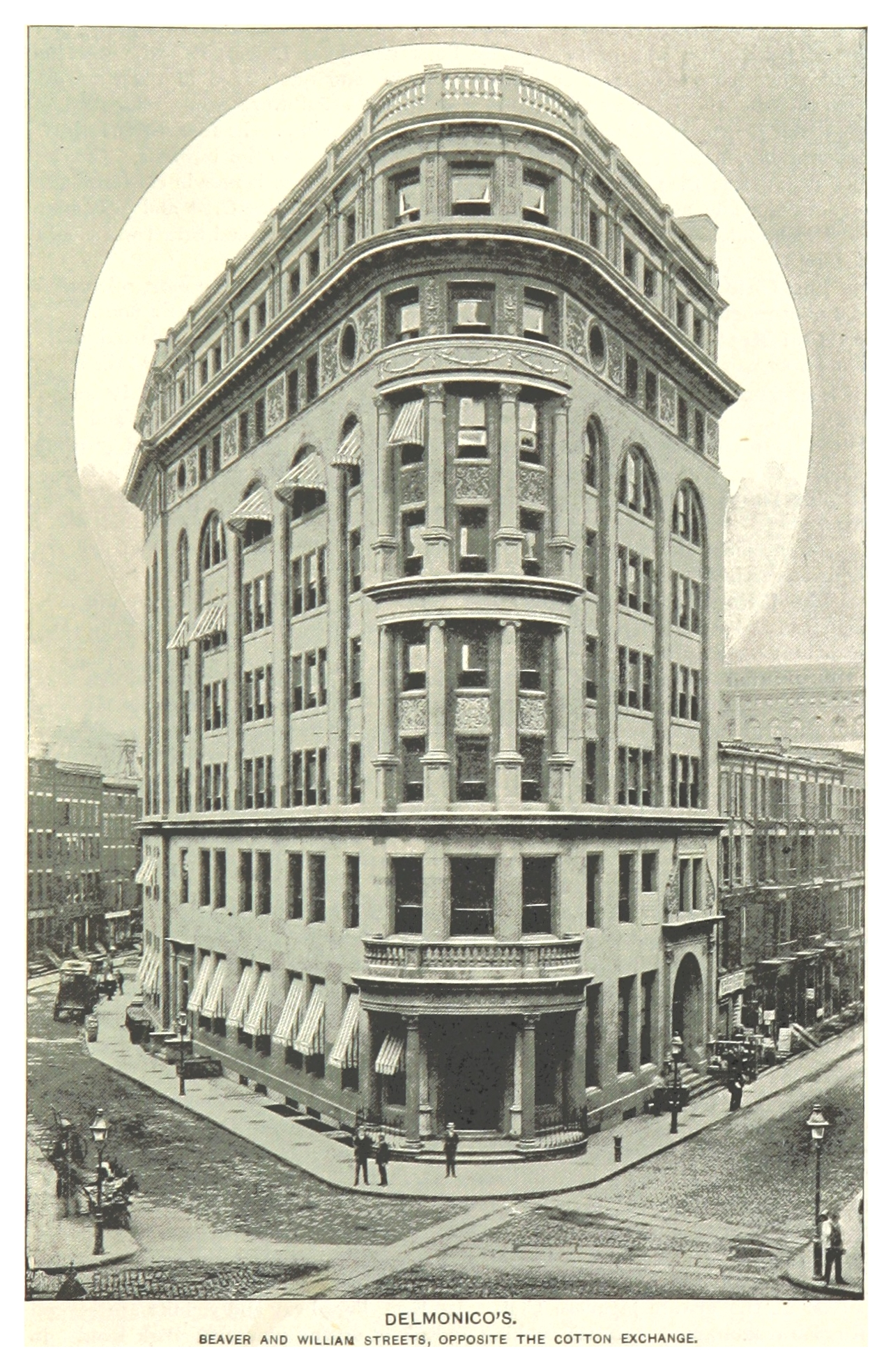
Delmonico's on 2 South Williams Street, where some early club events were held

The Musicians Club of New York was founded in 1911 by a group of musicians, composers, and educators looking to create a social organization for the musical community in New York City. As written on their certificate of incorporation, their mission statement was to "promote social intercourse among its members," and two, for "the mutual benefit and pleasure and the advancement in the various branches of musical art of its members." The thirty founders listed on the document, forming the first board of directors, included cellist Hans Kronold, organist-composers Clarence Eddy, C. B. Hawley, and Frank Edwin Ward, and first presidents Tali Esen Morgan and David Bispham. The club's first headquarters were at 62 West 45th Street in Midtown Manhattan.

Early club operations included various dinners and performances, held at such venues as the New Amsterdam Theatre, Carnegie Hall, and Delmonico's, while performers included club members and musicians such as Ignacy Jan Paderewski, Frances Alda, Ernestine Schumann-Heink, and Rudolph Ganz. In addition to musical performances, events would also feature comedy performances, folk songs, and lectures, and were known for being attended by the musical elite; one 1916 dinner was attended by soprano Johanna Gadski, violinist Fritz Kreisler, and tenor Enrico Caruso. A goal for some of these events was to provide a platform for contemporary American composers, who were considered underrepresented in the musical world. During its first decade the club hosted individual events dedicated to the works of composers such as Charles Wakefield Cadman, Sidney Homer, Mary Turner Salter, and Amy Beach; other women composers featured by the club during this period included Harriet Ware and Gena Branscombe, who would also continue to perform for the club for several more decades as a composer, conductor, and instrumentalist. From 1913 the club president was New York Symphony Orchestra conductor Walter Damrosch, who helped attract interest in the club. During his presidency the club headquarters were moved to 14 West 12th Street, a building shared with the Civic Club that held a 250-seat auditorium and a roof garden. Damrosch was reported as president as late as 1920, and he retained the title of honorary president until his death in 1950.

In 1918 the club held a fundraiser to provide support to French musicians who were struggling during World War I, and the following year launched a campaign for a proposed "American Composers' Fund", through which American composers would be supported by government grants totaling from $200,000 to $1,000,000. While eventually unsuccessful, the initiative received support from figures such as composer Henry F. Gilbert, arts patron Otto Hermann Kahn, and Congressman John J. Eagan, who at one point planned to propose a bill to Congress establishing such a fund, along with a national conservatory.

=== Frank La Forge and early scholarships ===
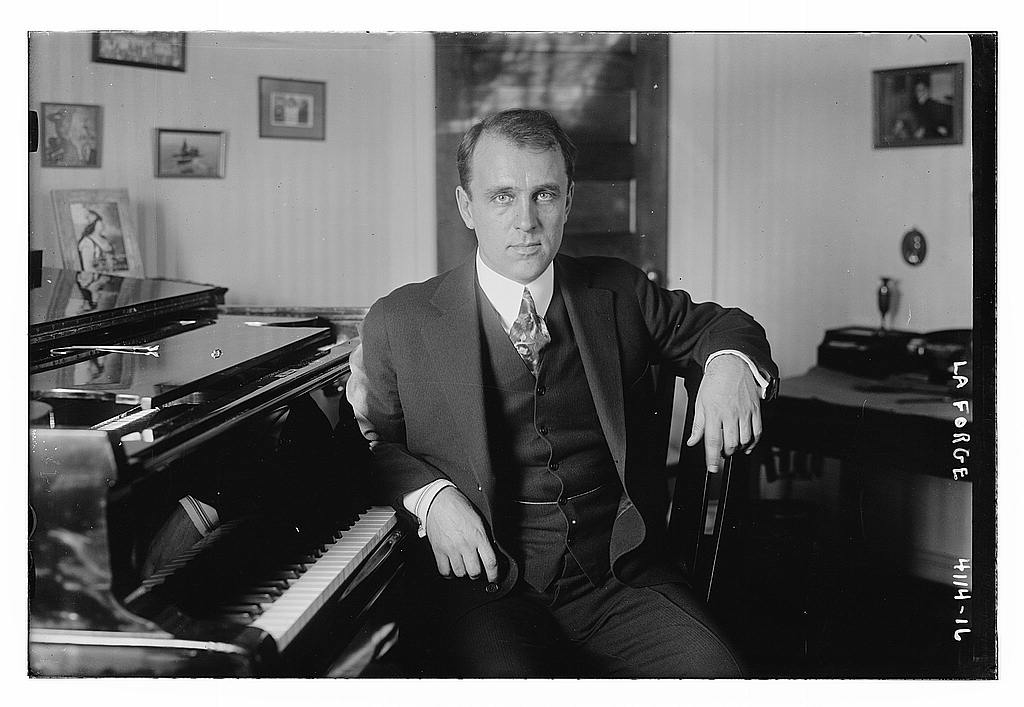
Frank La Forge, president from 1935 to 1953

Under the presidency of teacher and accompanist Frank La Forge, who began his tenure in 1935, the club endeavored to expand their mission to support young musicians and to foster general interest in classical music. The club fulfilled the first part of this mission by donating to music schools and sponsoring students at programs such as Tanglewood's Berkshire Music Center, and by 1953, the club estimated that it had contributed $1,500 to the cause of supporting young artists. That same year, La Forge suddenly died onstage at the age of 73 while performing piano at a club event in a Beekman Tower ballroom.

In 1956, under president Norman Dello Joio, the club first presented what came to be known as the Young Artist Awards, with the first winners being soprano Judith Raskin and baritone Carl White, who were awarded a total of $700. Later known as the Serge and Olga Koussevitzky Young Artist Awards, later recipients have included Jean Kraft (1959), Robert DeGaetano (1969), Paul Neubauer (1982) and François Salque (1994).

=== Koussevitzky years, KIRA, and 1979 reincorporation ===
In 1962 the presidency was assumed by Olga Koussevitzky, widow of conductor and composer Serge Koussevitzky and friend to figures such as Aaron Copland and Leonard Bernstein. Having been involved with education programs at Tanglewood Music Center and a figure behind the creation of a composers' studio near the premises, Koussevitzky expanded the club's reach in providing support for young musicians and underrepresented composers. From 1968 she established a "Young Artists in Performance" series, as well as from 1973 a concert program at the New York Public Library for the Performing Arts showcasing young artists, both of which were often broadcast on WNYC. Under Koussevitsky's leadership the club also put on multiple concerts showcasing works by women composers, often exclusively American. Koussevitzky resigned the presidency in 1975 for health reasons and was succeeded by Sylvia Rabinof.

In 1979, the Musicians Club reincorporated as a non-profit organization and received a grant from the Koussevitzky Foundation. Koussevitzky's involvement in the American International Music Fund (AIM), which administered the Koussevitzky International Recording Award (KIRA), also led to the organization being merged into the Musicians Club a year after her death in 1978. KIRA was established to award prizes for recorded works by contemporary composers, and since the acquisition has been awarded to composers such as Lucia Dlugoszewski (1980), Sofia Gubaidulina (1989 and 1993) and Stephen Jaffe (2004), as well as more well-known composers such as Pierre Boulez (1984) and Witold Lutosławski (1986).

== Present day ==
The Musicians Club continues administering the Young Artist Awards, and in 2017 inaugurated the Dorothy Indenbaum Women Composers series. They also present an annual "Member-Composers Concert" that showcases works by current club members. Member-composers from recent years have included Leonard Lehrman, Mira Spektor, and Kermit Moore.

== Notable members ==
=== Past presidents ===
- Tali Esen Morgan (1911–1912)
- David Bispham (1912–1913)
- Walter Damrosch (1913–1920)
- J. Fletcher Shera (1920–1923)
- Arthur Bergh (1924–1928)
- Henry Kimball Hadley (1929–1934)
- Frank La Forge (1935–1953)
- John Tasker Howard (1954–1955)
- Norman Dello Joio (1955–1958)
- A. Walter Kramer (1958–1960)
- Ada Holding Miller (1960-1962)
- Olga Koussevitzky (1962–1975)
- Sylvia Rabinof (1975-1980)
- Olegna Fuschi (1980–1981)
- Bruce L. Kubert (1981–2005)
- Joseph H. Conlin (2005–2007)
- Dorothy Indenbaum (2007–2008)
- Anthony Morss (2010–2012)
- Brian Hunter (2008–2010; 2012-present)

=== Other members ===
- Martha Atwood
- Ernesto Berúmen*
- William C. Carl
- Clarence Eddy*
- Clara Edwards (composer)
- Charles Haubiel*
- Victor Herbert*
- Florence Foster Jenkins
- Philip James*
- Hans Kronold*
- Alexander Lambert
- Eduardo Marzo
- Augustus Post*
- Silas G. Pratt
- Cornelius L. Reid
- Alexander Russell (composer)
- Oscar Saenger
- Frederick William Schlieder*
- John Prindle Scott
- Julia Smith (composer)*
- Claudette Sorel
- John Philip Sousa
- Oley Speaks*
- Deems Taylor*
- Florence Turner-Maley
- Richard Henry Warren*
- Frank Edwin Ward*
- Frances Williams

* = Board of Directors member
