= Frank Ward =

Frank or Francis Ward may refer to:

- Francis Marshall Ward (1830–1914), bass singer, composer and musician
- Francis Ward (British Army officer) (1840–1919), British soldier
- Frank Ward (cricketer, born 1865) (1865–?), English cricketer
- Frank Edwin Ward (1872–1953), American composer and organist
- Frank Ward (cricketer, born 1888) (1888–1952), English cricketer
- Francis Ward (rugby union) (1900–1990), New Zealand rugby union player
- Frank Ward (footballer) (1902–1974), English association footballer
- Frank Ward (basketball) (1904–1980), American basketball player
- Frank Ward (cricketer, born 1906) (1906–1974), Australian cricketer
- Frank Ward (cyclist) (born 1930), Irish cyclist
- Frank Alan Ward (born 1948), academic

== See also ==
- Frances Ward (disambiguation)
- Michael Francis Ward (1845–1881), Irish doctor and politician
