= Frank La Forge =

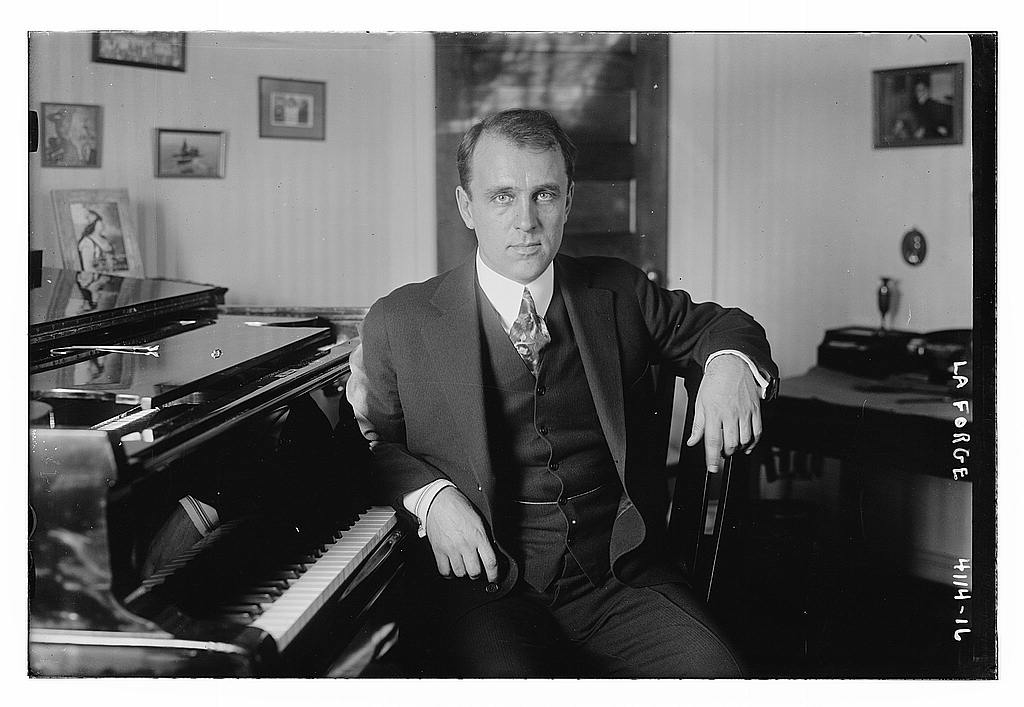
- La Forge in 1916

Background information
- Born: October 22, 1879; Rockford, Illinois
- Died: May 5, 1953 (aged 73) New York, New York
- Occupations: Composer, pianist, teacher, vocal coach
- Instrument: Piano
- Years active: 1902–1953

Frank La Forge (October 22, 1879 – May 5, 1953) was an American pianist, vocal coach, teacher, composer and arranger of art songs.

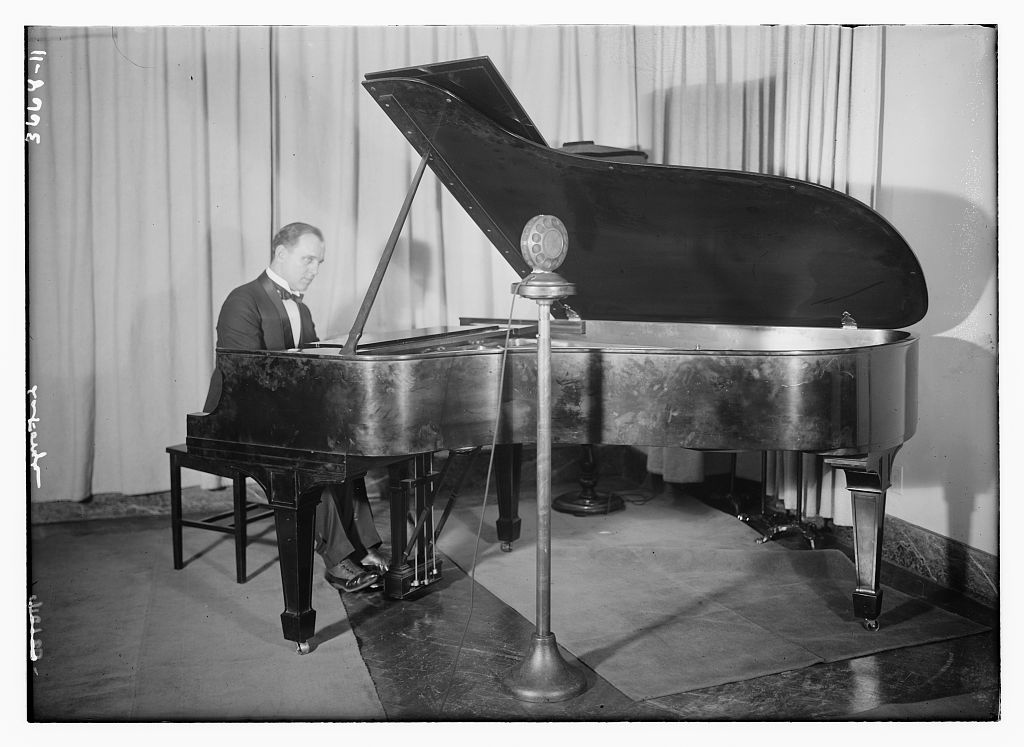
Frank La Forge at the piano, 1925

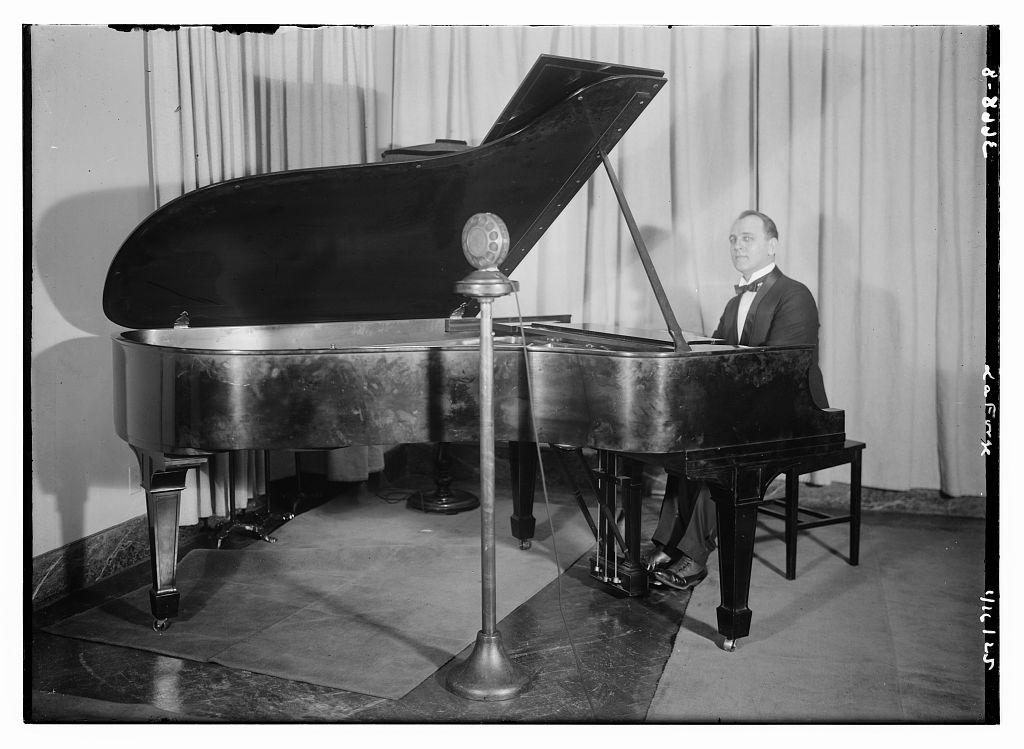
Frank La Forge at the piano, 1925

== Biography ==
He was born on October 22, 1879, in Rockford, Illinois.

La Forge was a boy soprano. He first studied piano with his older sister, and went to Vienna in 1900 to study with Theodor Leschetizky. He recorded prolifically for the Victor Talking Machine Company, as both a soloist and accompanist starting in 1906. As a soloist, he recorded works by Chopin, Liszt and MacDowell. In performance he usually accompanied entirely from memory, considered an unusual feat for an accompanist. In his biography Pathways of Song, La Forge claimed that he had 'a repertoire of over five thousand memorized accompaniments embracing all schools'. He toured Europe, Russia, and the United States as an accompanist to Marcella Sembrich. La Forge moved to New York City in 1920, where he became a music teacher, coach, and accompanist. He taught a number of important American singers, including Marian Anderson, Lawrence Tibbett, Marie Powers, Emma Otero and Richard Crooks. He served as accompanist for many vocal stars and instrumentalists of the day including Johanna Gadski, Ernestine Schumann-Heink and Margaret Matzenauer. His longstanding musical relationship with Metropolitan Opera soprano Lily Pons from 1937 until his death, saw the production of recital tours with flutist Frank Versaci, down the eastern seaboard and in British Columbia.

La Forge died at the piano, performing at a Musicians Club of New York dinner in Manhattan on May 5, 1953, for which he had been president since 1935.

== Musical works ==
La Forge composed around 40 songs for voice and piano in the years between 1906 and 1940, as well as a few piano solos, choral works, and at least one solo for violin and piano. Some of the songs are sacred, and most were published individually by G. Schirmer, while a few have been reissued in various song anthologies and collections of American art songs from the same publisher. Many of his early songs were composed to German texts and modeled on the German Lied. Later songs were composed in the more accessible 'concert ballad' style, which was quite popular at the time. Many were written for specific singers to show off their individual talents.

The songs are known for their craftsmanship, full piano accompaniments, and tasteful musical style. His 1919 piece Song of the Open was highlighted by Upton as representative of American song from the era 1900-1930.

He was also a highly successful arranger of folksongs; Villamil mentions 'an excellent set of Mexican folk songs'. Perhaps more significant was his work as an important compiler of songs for students, in the collection of several volumes he created with Will Earhart, the Pathways of Song.

== Published secular songs ==
published by G. Schirmer unless noted

- The Butterfly (Der Schmetterling)
- By the Lake
- Camp Meetin' Song (text by La Forge), Carl Fischer, 1952
- Come Unto These Yellow Sands (Shakespeare), 1907
- Contemplation
- The Coyote
- Expectancy (Erwartung)
- Far Away
- Hidden Wounds (Verborgene Wunden)
- Hills (Arthur Guiterman), G. Ricordi, 1925
- How Much I Love You (Wie lieb ich dich hab')
- I Came with a Song (Elizabeth Ruggles), 1914
- I Love But Thee!
- In Evening Stillness (In der Abendstille)
- In Pride of May
- Like the Rosebud (Avec une ruse), 1906
- The Lovely Rose
- May's Coming (Frühlingseinzug)
- My Love and I
- Pastorale (John Milton), Galaxy Music, 1932
- Reawakening (Widererwachen)
- Retreat (Schlupfwinkel) (Princess Gabriele Wrede; English translation), 1906
- Serenade
- Song of the Open (Jessica H. Lowell), Ditson, 1919
- Spooks (Spuk)
- Take, O Take Those Lips Away (Shakespeare)
- To a Messenger (An einem Boten) (Princess Gabriele Wrede; English translation), 1909
- To a Violet
- To One Afar
- Vale Carissima
- Voodoo Spirits (Della Hayward), Carl Fischer, 1946
- When Your Dear Hands
- Wherefore? (Wozu?)

== Published sacred songs ==
published by G. Schirmer unless noted

- And there were shepherds abiding in the fields, Carl Fischer, 1938
- Before the Crucifix (Dinanzi al crocifisso) (Princess Gabriele Wrede; English version by Robert Huntington; Italian version by Paolo Rusca), 1912
- Bless the Lord (Psalm 103), Carl Fischer, 1933
- But the Hour Cometh
- Hast Thou Not Known
- Have Mercy Upon Me O God, Sacred Song For Voice and Piano, 1942
- Make a Joyful Noise, Carl Fischer, 1938
- O Sing Unto the Lord
- The Shephard
- Supplication (Minnie K. Breid), Flammer, 1918
- Teach Me, O Lord, Carl Fischer, 1938
- They that trust in the Lord, Galaxy, 1942

== Published choral works ==
- First Psalm, SATB or TTBB a cappella

== Published piano solos ==
- Etude for sostenuto pedal, for piano, Carl Fischer publisher, 1943
- Gavotte
- Gavotte and Musette
- Improvisation
- Romance, 1911
- Souvenir de Vienne
- Valse de Concert, 1912

== Published instrumental solos ==
- Romance, violin and piano

== Arrangements and editing ==
- Echo Song by Henry Bishop, transcribed for voice, flute and piano by La Forge, Schirmer, 1940
- Fledermaus Fantasy, excerpts from Die Fledermaus by Johann Strauss II, transcribed for voice, flute and piano by La Forge, Schirmer, 1943
- Little swallow (O légère hirondelle), waltz song from Mireille by Charles Gounod, transcribed for voice, flute and piano by La Forge, Schirmer, 1942
- Love-Tide of Spring (La primavera d'or) by Alexander Glazunov, transcription for voice and piano, Schirmer, 1913
- Menuet Varié (Minuet with variations), anonymous 18th-century French work, transcribed for voice, flute and piano by La Forge, Schirmer, 1940
- Mexican Songs for voice and piano, arranged and translated by La Forge, G. Ricordi publisher:

1. Pregúntales á las Estrellas (O ask of the stars, beloved), Mexican folk-song, 1922
2. Crepuscúlo (Twilight), Mexican folk-song, 1922
3. El Céfiro (The Zephyr), Mexican folk-song, 1922
4. La Paloma (The Dove) by Sebastián Yradier, 1922
5. La Golondrina (The Swallow), Mexican folk-song, 1922
6. En Cuba (Cuban Song) by Eduardo Sánchez de Fuentes, 1923
7. Estrellita (Little Star) by Manuel Ponce, 1923
8. Yo paso la Vida (In Sorrow and Sighing) by Jose Islas, 1926

- On the beautiful blue Danube by Johann Strauss II, transcribed for voice and piano by La Forge, G. Ricordi, 1928
- Pathways of Song, compiled, arranged, translated and edited by Frank LaForge and Will Earhart, M. Witmark publisher, 1938
- Tales from the Vienna Forest by Johann Strauss II, piano solo transcribed for voice and piano by La Forge, Schirmer, 1912
