= Conlin =

Conlin is most commonly known as the Anglicized variation of many Irish family surnames. Variations include Conlan, Conlon, and Connellan. All are derived from the Gaelic families O'Conallain and O'Caoindealbhain, located in Munster and Leinster. Other variants can include Kindellan, Quinlan and Quinlivan. The Conlin variant is now rare in Ireland, but can still be found in Britain and the United States.

Notable people with the surname include:

- Arthur Conlin, 20th-century Australian rugby player
- Bill Conlin (1934–2014), American sportswriter
- Joseph H. Conlin, 20th-century American impresario and opera director
- Michaela Conlin, American actress
