= Frances Ward =

Frances Ward may refer to:

- Frances Ward (priest) (born 1959), Anglican priest and theologian
- Frances Ward, 6th Baroness Dudley (died 1697)

== See also ==
- Frank Ward (disambiguation)
