= Kensington =

District within the Royal Borough of Kensington and Chelsea in central London

Coordinates: 51.500°N 0.190°W

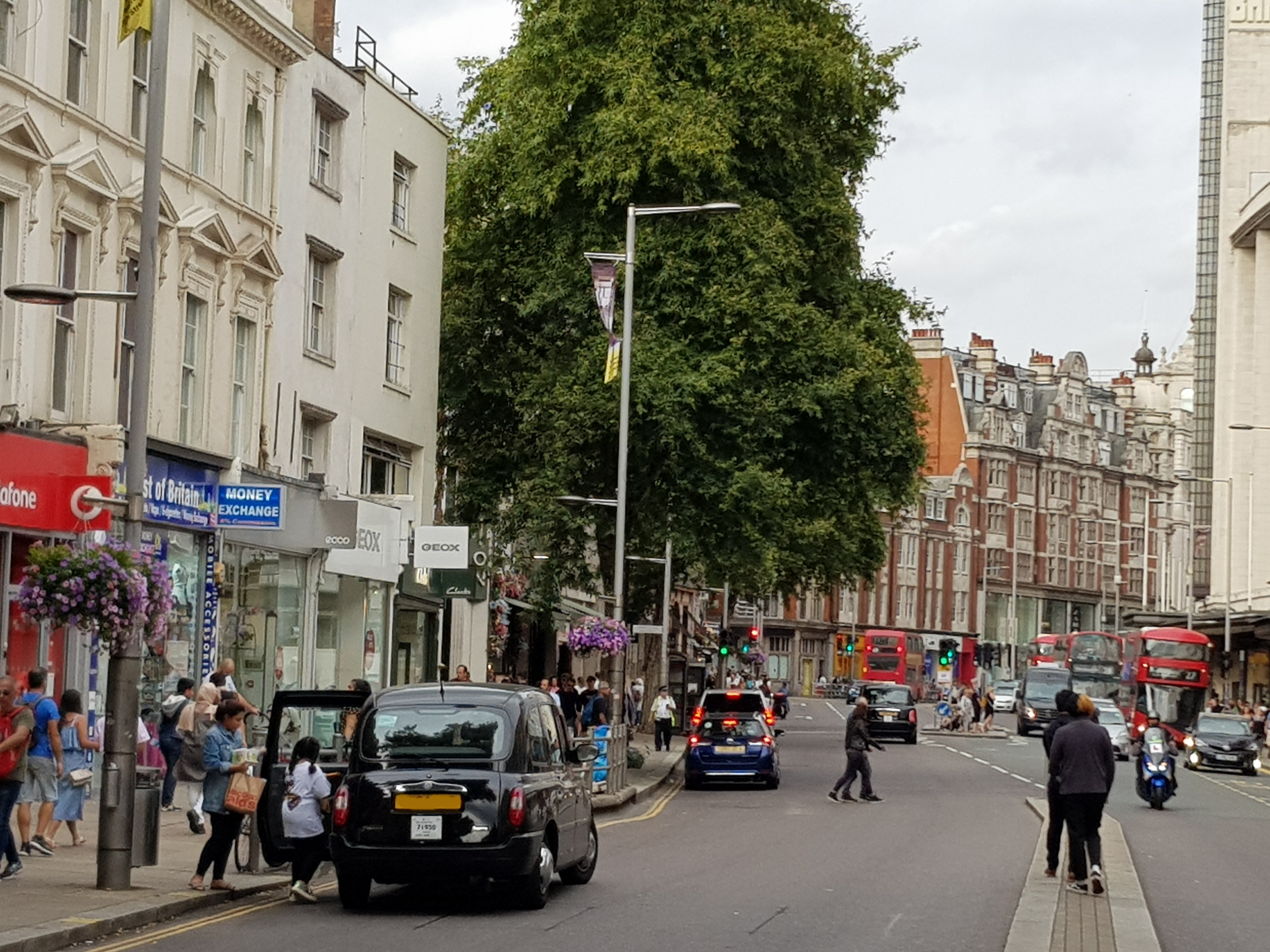
- Kensington High Street

- Location within Greater London
- Population: 64,681 (2011 census)
- OS grid reference: TQ255795
- London borough: Kensington & Chelsea
- Ceremonial county: Greater London
- Region: London
- Country: England
- Sovereign state: United Kingdom
- Post town: LONDON
- Postcode district: W8, W14
- Dialling code: 020
- Police: Metropolitan
- Fire: London
- Ambulance: London
- UK Parliament: Kensington and Bayswater
- London Assembly: West Central

Kensington is an area of London in the Royal Borough of Kensington and Chelsea, centred around 2.9 miles (4.6 km) west of Charing Cross. (Note: Measured from Kensington High St, outside the Underground station to Charing Cross, following tradition.)

The district's commercial heart is Kensington High Street, which runs east–west. The north-east is taken up by Kensington Gardens, containing the Albert Memorial, the Serpentine Gallery and Speke's monument. South Kensington and Gloucester Road are home to Imperial College London, the Royal College of Music, the Royal Albert Hall, Natural History Museum, Victoria and Albert Museum, and Science Museum. The area is also home to many embassies and consulates.

== Name ==
The manor of Chenesitone is listed in the Domesday Book of 1086, which in the Anglo-Saxon language means "Chenesi's ton" (homestead/settlement). One early spelling is Kesyngton, as written in 1396.

== History ==
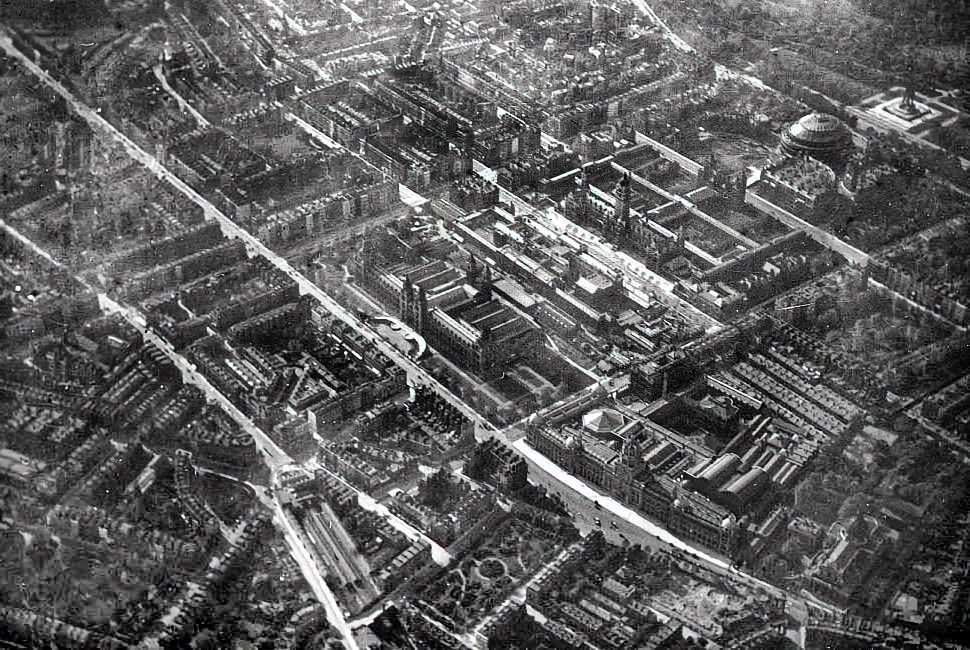
Kensington photographed by scientist Sir Norman Lockyer in 1909 from a helium balloon

The manor of Kensington, in the county of Middlesex, was one of several hundred granted by King William the Conqueror (1066–1089) to Geoffrey de Montbray (or Mowbray), Bishop of Coutances in Normandy, one of his inner circle of advisors and one of the wealthiest men in post-Conquest England. He granted the tenancy of Kensington to his follower Aubrey de Vere I, who was holding the manor from him as overlord in 1086, according to the Domesday Book. The bishop's heir, Robert de Mowbray, rebelled against King William II, and his vast feudal barony was forfeited to the Crown. Aubrey de Vere I thus became a tenant-in-chief, holding directly from the king after 1095, which increased his status in feudal England. He granted the church and an estate within the manor to Abingdon Abbey in Oxfordshire, at the deathbed request of his eldest son Geoffrey. As the de Veres became Earls of Oxford, their principal manor at Kensington came to be known as Earl's Court, as they were not resident in the manor, and their manorial business was not conducted in the great hall of a manor house but in a courthouse. In order to differentiate it, the new sub-manor granted to Abingdon Abbey became known as Abbot's Kensington and the church St Mary Abbots.

The original Kensington Barracks, built at Kensington Gate in the late 18th century, were demolished in 1858 and new barracks were built in Kensington Church Street.

== Geography ==
A map showing the and Chelsea but wards of Kensington Metropolitan Borough as they appeared in 1916

The focus of the area is Kensington High Street, a busy commercial centre with many shops, typically upmarket. The street was declared London's second best shopping street in February 2005 due to its wide range and number of shops. However, since October 2008 the street has faced competition from the Westfield shopping centre in nearby White City.

Kensington's second group of commercial buildings is at South Kensington, with several streets of small- to medium-sized shops and service businesses near South Kensington tube station. This is also the southern end of Exhibition Road, the location of the area's museums and educational institutions.

The boundaries of Kensington are not well defined; in particular, the boundary of the southern part of Kensington with Chelsea (another ancient manor) varies depending on whether electoral or postal, or other definitions are used; they have similar architecture. To the west, a boundary is clearly defined by the line of the Counter Creek marked by the West London railway line. To the north, the only obvious border line is Holland Park Avenue, to the north of which is the district of Notting Hill (another ancient manor), usually classed as within "North Kensington".

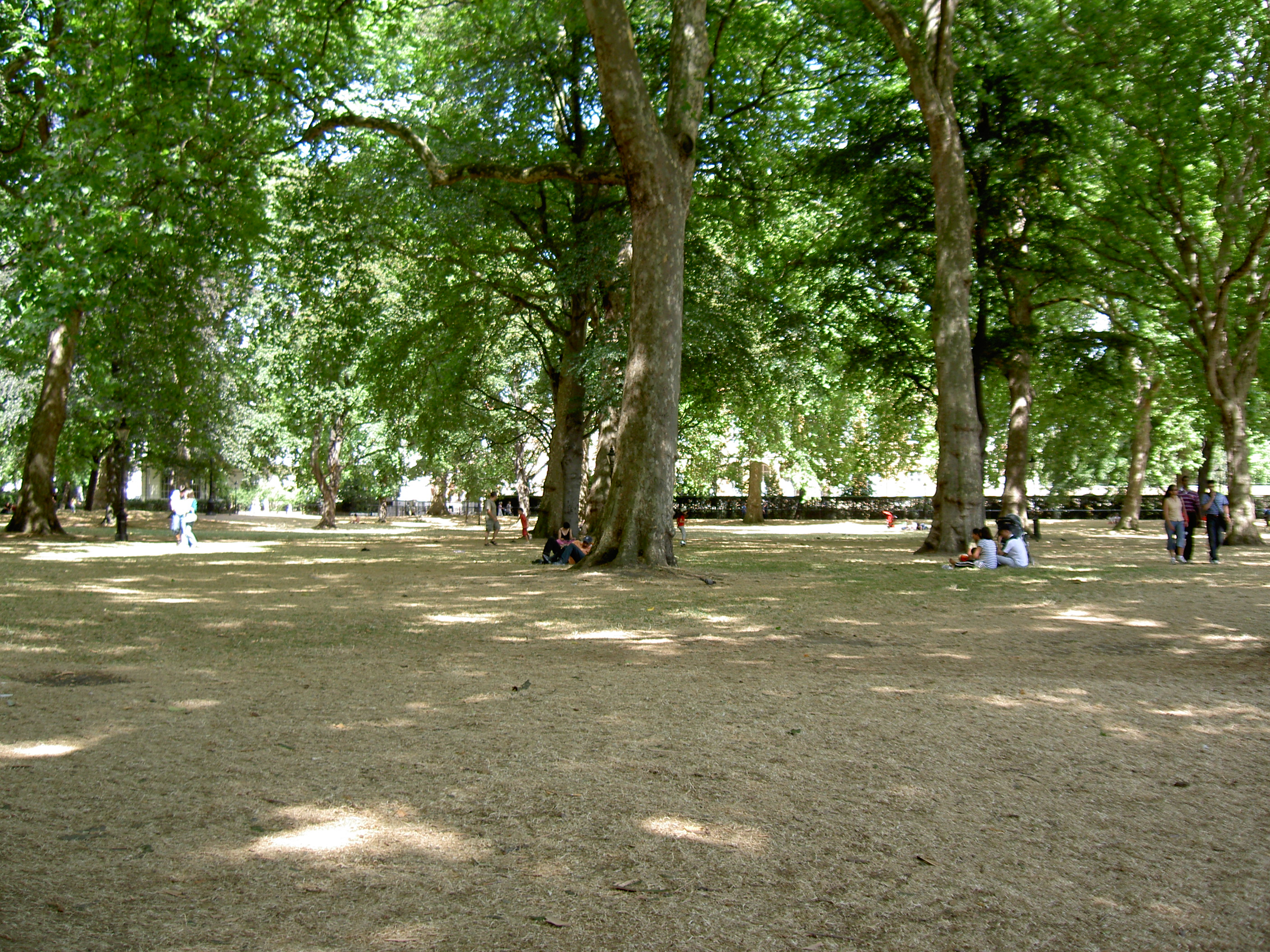
Kensington Gardens in the summer

In the north east is the large public Royal Park of Kensington Gardens (contiguous with its eastern neighbour, Hyde Park). The other main green area in Kensington is Holland Park, on the north side of the eastern end of Kensington High Street. Many residential roads have small communal garden squares, for the exclusive use of the residents.

The sub districts of Kensington: South Kensington and Earl's Court also consist largely of private housing. North Kensington and West Kensington are largely devoid of features to attract the visitor.

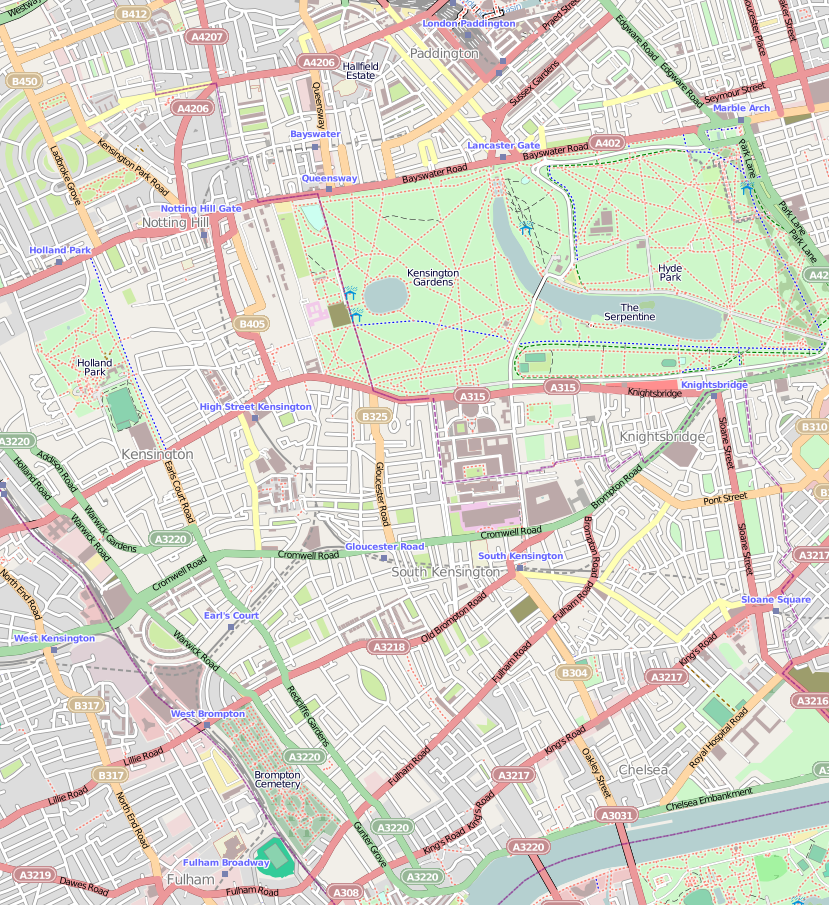
Map of central Kensington (click to enlarge)

Kensington is, in general, an extremely affluent area, like its neighbour Chelsea. The area has some of London's most expensive streets and garden squares, and at about the turn of the 21st century the Holland Park neighbourhood became particularly high-status. In early 2007 houses sold in Upper Phillimore Gardens, immediately east of Holland Park, for over £20 million. Brompton is another definable area of Kensington.

The Royal Borough of Kensington and Chelsea is the most densely populated local government district in the United Kingdom. This high density has come about through the subdivision of large mid-rise Georgian and Victorian terraced houses (generally of four to six floors) into flats. The less-affluent northern extremity of Kensington has high-rise residential buildings, while this type of building in the southern part is only represented by the Holiday Inn's London Kensington Forum Hotel in Cromwell Road, a 27-storey building.

Notable attractions and institutions in Kensington include Kensington Palace in Kensington Gardens, the Royal Albert Hall opposite the Albert Memorial in Hyde Park, the Royal College of Music, the Natural History Museum, the Science Museum, the Victoria and Albert Museum, Heythrop College, Imperial College, the Royal College of Art, and Kensington and Chelsea College. The Olympia Exhibition Hall is just over the western border in West Kensington.

== Administration ==
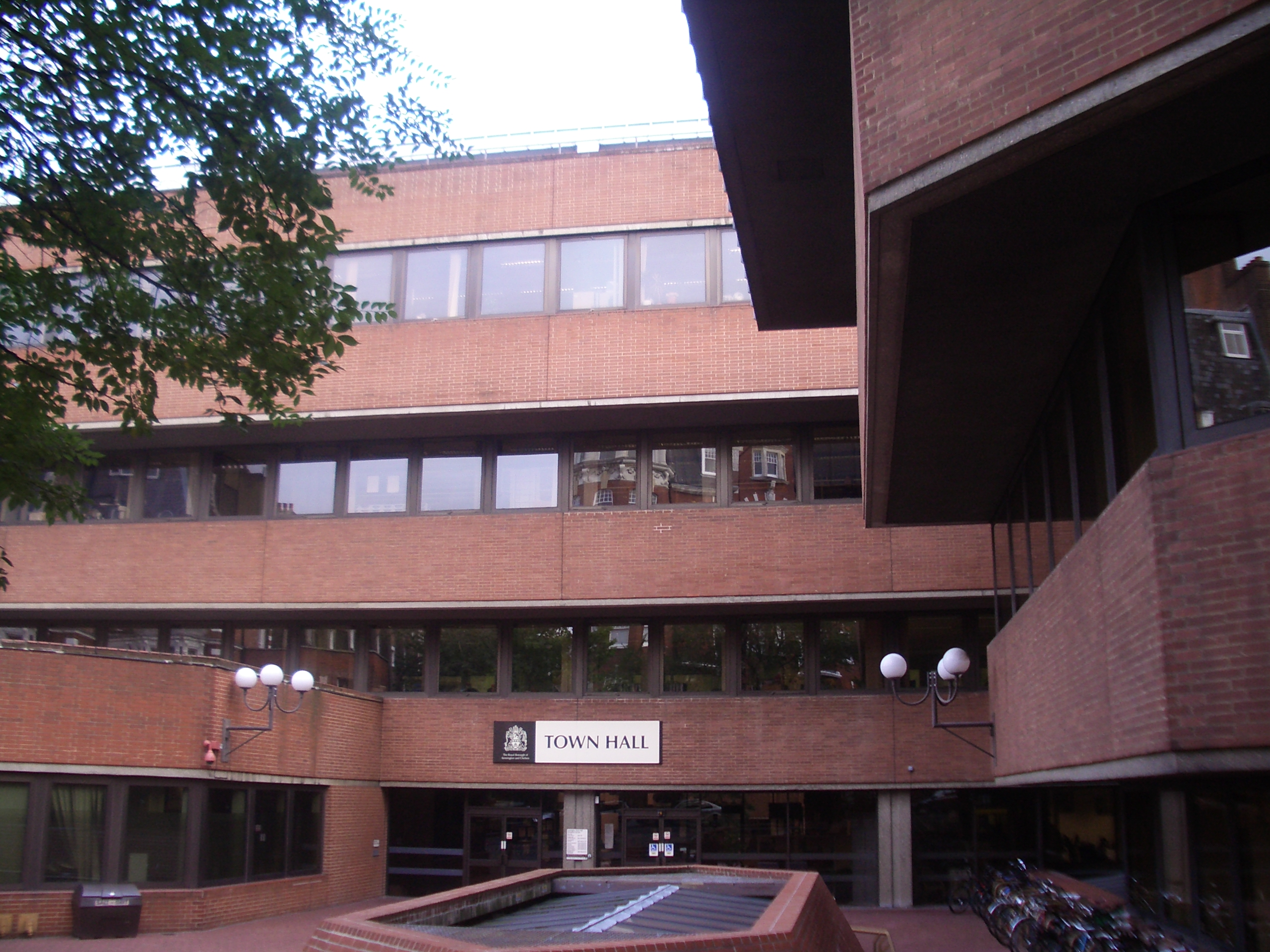
Kensington Town Hall, completed in 1976

Kensington is administered within the Royal Borough of Kensington and Chelsea, and lies within the Kensington and Bayswater parliamentary constituency.

== Media sector ==
The head office of newspaper group DMGT is located in Northcliffe House off Kensington High Street in part of the large Barkers department store building. In addition to housing the offices for the DMGT newspapers Daily Mail, Mail on Sunday and Metro, Northcliffe House also accommodates the offices of the newspapers owned by Evgeny Lebedev: The Independent, The Independent on Sunday, and the Evening Standard. The i newspaper, sold to Johnston Press in 2016, is still produced from offices in Northcliffe House. Most of these titles were for many decades produced and printed in Fleet Street in the City of London.

The building also houses Lebedev's TV channel London Live, with its news studio situated in part of the former department store, using St Mary Abbots church and Kensington Church Street as live backdrop.

== Transport ==
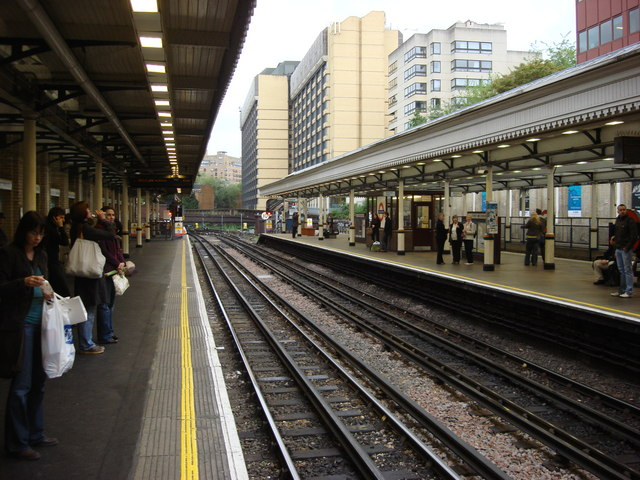
High Street Kensington tube station is served by the Circle and District lines.

Kensington is crossed by three main roads, the most important of which is the A4 Cromwell Road which connects it to Central London on the east and to Hounslow and Heathrow Airport on the west. Parallel to the north is Kensington Road (of which Kensington High Street forms the eastern part), linking central London and Hammersmith and Hounslow to the area. To the south is Fulham Road, which connects South Kensington with Fulham to the south-west. North-south connections are not as well-developed and there is no obvious single north–south route through the area.

Kensington is well served by public transport. Most of Kensington is served by three stations in the London fare zone 1: High Street Kensington, Gloucester Road and South Kensington. All three are served by the Circle line which connects them to London's railway terminals. The District line also serves all three stations, albeit on different branches; it links the latter two to Westminster and the City. The Piccadilly line also links South Kensington and Gloucester Road to the West End in about 10 minutes, and in the other direction to Chiswick, Ealing, Hounslow and Heathrow Airport in around 20–40 minutes, depending on the area of choice. In addition Kensington (Olympia) in London fare zone 2 serves the western part of Kensington, with District line trains to Earl's Court and High Street Kensington. Nearby West Kensington station takes its name from the former boundaries with Hammersmith and is not in the Borough.

A number of local bus services link Kensington into the surrounding districts, and key hubs are Kensington High Street and South Kensington station. These bus services were improved in frequency and spread from 2007 until 2010 when the western extension of the London congestion charge area existed (which required drivers of cars and vans during the charging hours Monday-Friday to pay a daily fee of £8).

In 2020 a temporary cycle lane on Kensington High Street caused a nationwide media stir. The temporary cycle lane was installed by the local council in September 2020 with £700,000 in funding from central government grants, but it was removed in December 2020.

== Sports ==
Kensington has one football team, Kensington Borough F.C., which currently plays in the Combined Counties Football League.

== Notable people ==
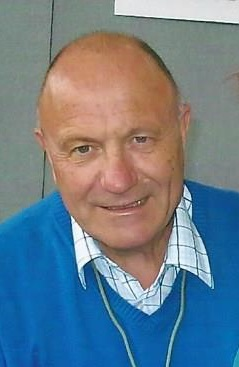
George Cohen

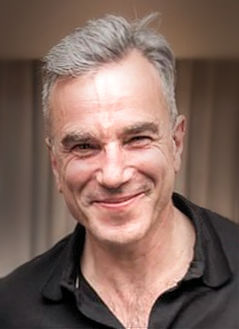
Daniel Day-Lewis

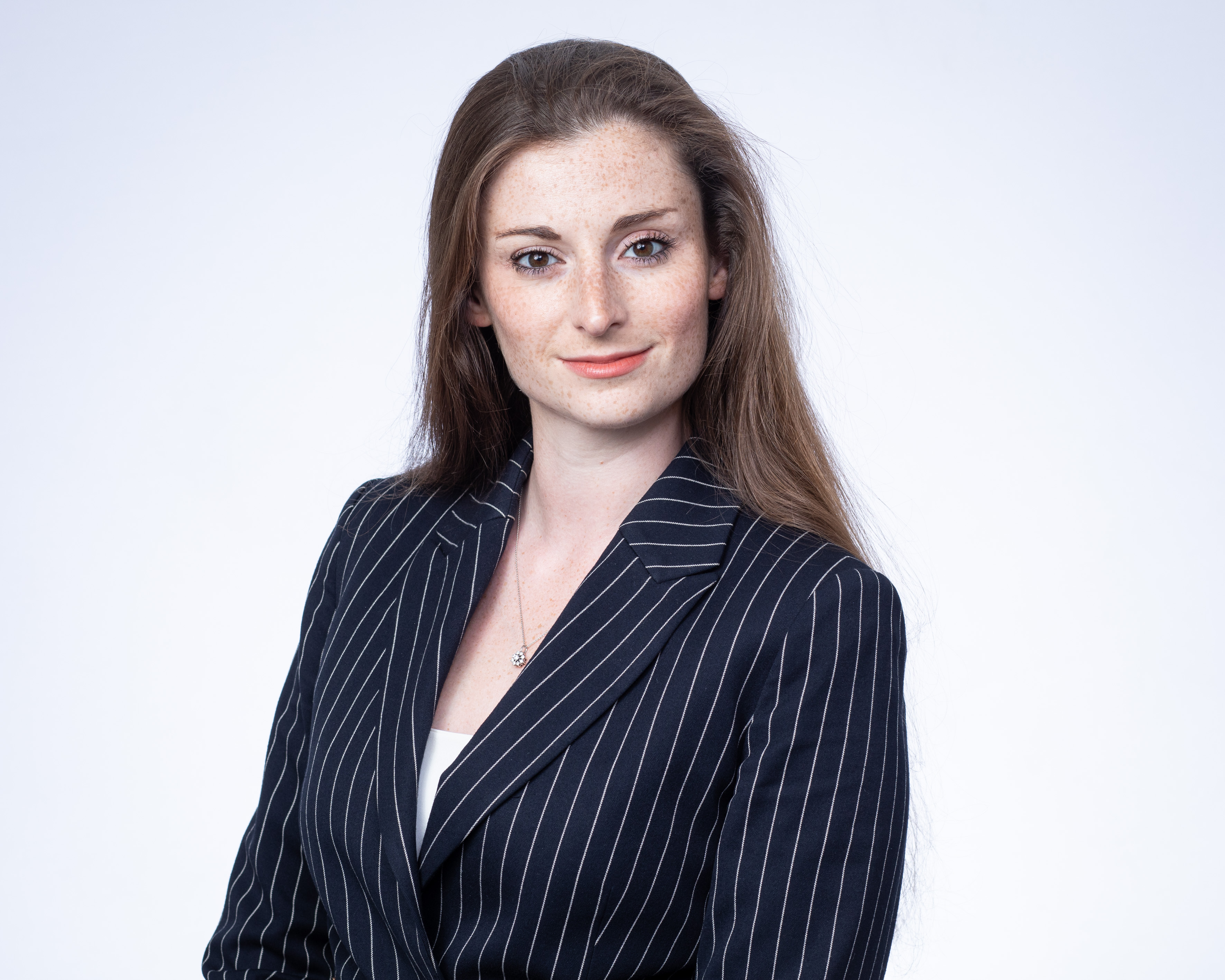
Natasha Hausdorff

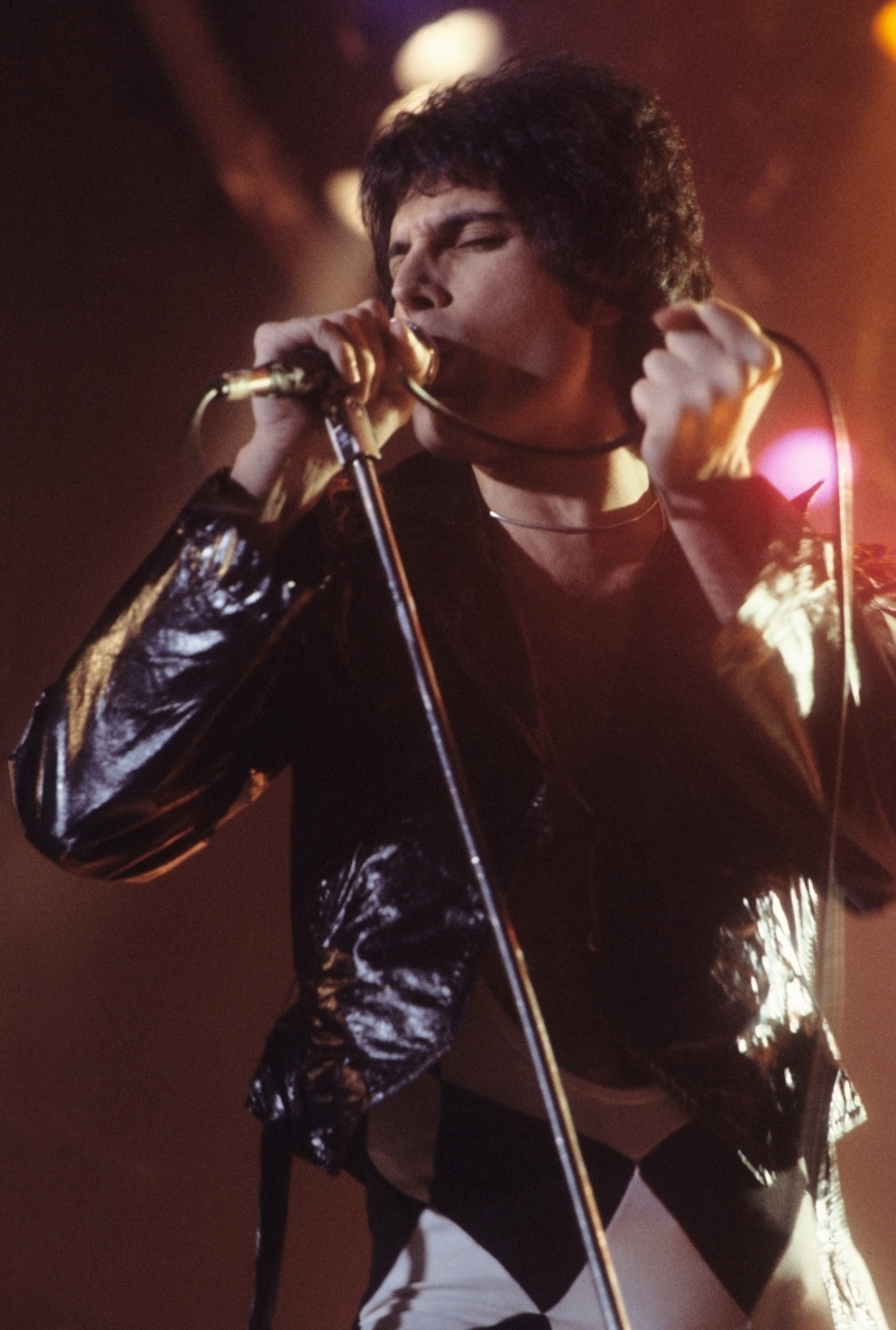
Freddie Mercury

- Renée Asherson (1915–2014), actress
- Shaun Bailey, Baron Bailey of Paddington (born 1971), politician and former journalist
- Jeremy Bamber (born 1961), convicted mass murderer
- Robert Bentley (1821–1893), botanist.
- Ivan Berlyn (1867–1934), film and stage actor
- Antonia Bird (1951–2013), film director
- Howard Blake (born 1938), composer, conductor and pianist
- Betty Boo (born 1970), singer and songwriter
- Frank Boys (1918–2003), first-class cricketer
- Les Champelovier (1933–2023), amateur footballer
- Lady Sarah Chatto (born 1964), member of the British royal family
- George Cohen (1939–2022), professional footballer
- Frank Cadogan Cowper (1877–1958), artist
- Daniel Day-Lewis (born 1957), Academy Award-winning actor
- Dido (born 1971), singer and songwriter
- Carmen Ejogo (born 1973), actress and singer
- Evangeline Florence (1867–1928), soprano
- Justine Frischmann (born 1969), musician
- Percival Gale (1865–1940), cricketer
- Michael Gove (born 1967), Scottish journalist and politician
- Carey Harrison (1944–2025), novelist and dramatist
- Natasha Hausdorff (born 1989), barrister, international law commentator, and Israel advocate
- Mary Headlam (1873–1959), artist
- Tom Holland (born 1996), actor
- William Leach (1883–1969), first-class cricketer
- Rotha Lintorn-Orman (1895–1935), fascist activist
- James Longman (born 1986), ABC News chief international correspondent
- Montague MacLean (1870–1951), cricketer
- Freddie Mercury (1946–1991), frontman of the British rock band Queen
- Jimmy Page (born 1944), guitarist of the British rock band Led Zeppelin
- Una-Mary Parker (1930–2019), journalist and novelist
- Frank de Pass (1887–1914), officer in the British Indian Army, recipient of the Victoria Cross
- Reginald Popham (1892–1975), cricketer and footballer
- Sir John Richard Robinson, journalist and editor
- Christopher Stanger-Leathes (1881–1966), rugby union international
- Jason Vale (born 1969), lifestyle coach and author
- Frank Ward (1888–1952), first-class cricketer
- Frank Westerton (1866–1923), stage and silent-film actor
- Dennis Wise (born 1966), footballer and manager

== See also ==
- Little Australia
- Earl's Court
- Kensington Roof Gardens
- Kensington, Liverpool
- Kensington, Brooklyn
- Kensington, Philadelphia
- Kensington, Saskatoon
