= Arnold Blackner =

American opera singer (1893–1969)

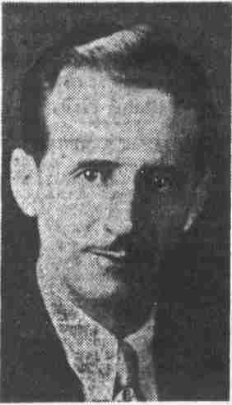
- Blackner in 1931
- Born: 26 September 1893; Beaver, Utah, US
- Died: 25 May 1969 (aged 75)
- Other names: The Cowboy Tenor
- Education: Brigham Young High School; Utah State University
- Occupation: Opera singer
- Spouse: Essie May Pope (m. 1914)
- Children: 6

Arnold Blackner (26 September 1893 – 25 May 1969), known as "The Cowboy Tenor", was a popular operatic singer in the 1910s through the 1930s. He studied with C. R. Johnson at Utah State University and performed with many of the singing groups there. He gave various performances in the 1920s, and went abroad to study with John Ardizoni and Ernestine Schumann-Heink. In an early demonstration of telephone technology, he was introduced to the director of the Metropolitan Opera from a club in San Francisco. He went on a concert tour to the northwest states and to the states surrounding Utah in 1931. He toured Utah in 1935.

== Birth and education ==
Arnold Blackner was born on September 26, 1893, in Beaver, Utah, to John Henry and Hanna Elizabeth Eyre Blackner. When he attended Brigham Young High School in 1910, his hometown was listed at Lyman, Wyoming. The Greenley Daily Tribune stated that he gave up "bronco busting" to become a professional musician. Blackner attended the Agricultural College of Utah (now Utah State University) from 1916 to 1917 and studied with professor C. R. Johnson. There he participated in a male quartet, glee club, and performed with the college opera. In 1928, he performed in Logan in a concert sponsored by the Imperial Glee club.

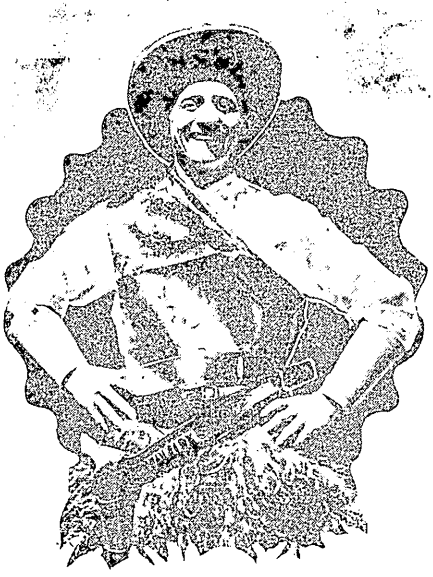
Cowboy Tenor Arnold E. Blackner

== Early performances ==
In 1914, he performed in a group called "That Different Quartette" with H. R. Poulton, Arnold Poulton, and Alvin Keddington. Blackner was referred to as "The Cowboy Tenor" during his early performance period. Blackner played a concert in Saltair in 1918 in "one of the best programs of the entire season." He sang in a duet with Albert J. Southwick at a July 1922 Saltair band concert. In 1926, he performed in a silent movie theater as entertainment to accompany the movie. He sang "O Lord, Remember Me" in the October General Conference of the Church of Jesus Christ of Latter-day Saints (LDS Church) in 1928. A student newspaper called him a "world famous tenor" in 1928.

== Professional training and subsequent concerts ==
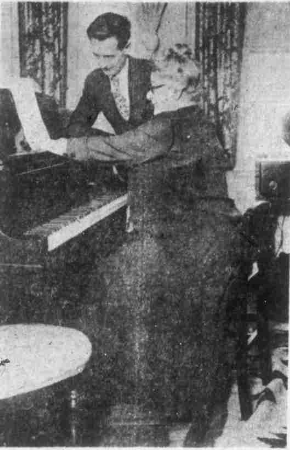
Arnold Blackner with Schumann-Heink

At some point between 1923 and 1929, he studied with John Ardizoni (son of Manuel Ardizoni). Who's Who in Los Angeles County stated that Blackner, Philip Merivale, and the Fairbanks Twins "obtained worldwide applause because of [Ardizoni's] artistic and tutorial genius. In 1929, he had been abroad and returned to Utah to perform in a June concert in the Salt Lake Tabernacle with accompanist William Peterson. The concert included songs "Carasalba" by Handel, airs from Tosca and Aida as well as "Serenade" from The Student Prince. The Salt Lake Tribune reported that he would be studying with Ernestine Schumann-Heink. At the time, she had quit singing opera to devote herself to teaching promising young artists. Blackner was to go to Germany in the fall of 1929 to study with her or "under her special direction." In April 1929, The Salt Lake Tribune said that Schumann-Heink was "likely" to visit Utah. Blackner sang in a special 24-hour radio program to dedicate KSL's new 5,000 watt transmitter in 1929. His program was at 10pm and was broadcast from the National Broadcasting Company in New York.

Blackner sang several songs at the LDS Seminary in Weber County in 1931. In August 1931, Blackner went on tour singing in over 50 concerts in Wyoming, Colorado, Texas, New Mexico, Arizona, Nevada, and California. His manager was L. G. Ellsworth. In his Ogden performance, he sang "Swanee River," "Danny Boy," "Calm the Night," and "Vesti la giubba" from Leoncavallo's Pagliacci. He was the featured singer for eight weeks at Grauman Chinese theater in Hollywood, California. He also had a concert tour in the northwest. The article claims that he was "the first man to be introduced over the long distance telephone" when the Jonathan Club of San Francisco introduced him to Giulio Gatti-Casazza of the Metropolitan Opera. Supposedly, this was the first time someone sang over the telephone successfully over a distance of 3,000 miles. In a review of a concert before 1931, an unknown journalist praised the accuracy and range of his voice. An audience favorite was "Vesti la giubba" from "Pagliacci". Quoting from an LA Times review, Greeley reported that Blackner "lassoed the attention of a large audience and held them spell-bound" with "one of the finest exhibitions of voice beauty local music lovers have yet been enchanced [sic] to hear".

In 1932, Blackner started studying with Pietro Chamini in Los Angeles. Also in 1932, he was directing the Lincoln ward male chorus. In 1935, he lived in Lyman, Wyoming. He visited Utah for his uncle Leonard Blackner's funeral and sang several concerts during his travels in Beaver and Cedar City. He gave a benefit concert for the Daughters of the Utah Pioneers in February 1935. He performed with "the Los Angeles and Philadelphia Grand Opera Associations".

== Business ==
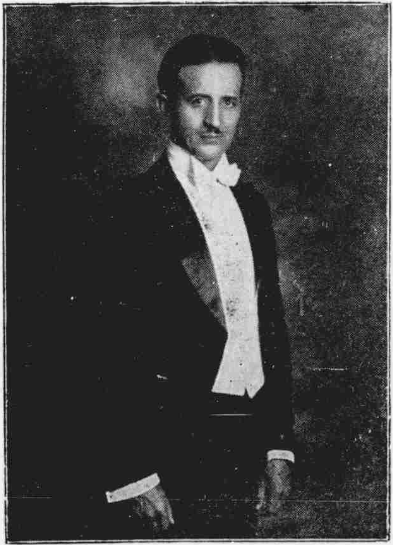
Blackner in 1935

Blackner helped to organize the poultry business in Draper. In 1926, he led a delegation of visitors from Lyman, Wyoming to see poultry conditions in Draper, Utah. His role was as the cowboy tenor who was famous from the radio. He performed at an armistice day celebration put together by Draper Poultry men for all of the poultry farmers in the state of Utah in 1929. He also had mining interests in Lovelock, Nevada.

He lived in Lyman, Wyoming, Salt Lake City, Utah, Santa Rose, California, Escondido, California, and Lovelock, Nevada at different points in his life.

== Personal life and death ==
Blackner was active in the LDS Church his entire life. He married Essie May Pope on October 14, 1914, in Lyman, Wyoming. They had six children together. Blackner died on May 25, 1969. He was buried in the Draper cemetery.
