= Les Champelovier =

English footballer

Personal information
- Full name: Leslie William Champelovier
- Date of birth: 23 April 1933
- Place of birth: Kensington, England
- Date of death: 28 January 2023 (aged 89)
- Place of death: Essex
- Position: Inside forward

Senior career*
Years	Team	Apps	(Gls)
195?–1954	Ilford		
1954–1962	Hayes		
1957	Brighton & Hove Albion	1	(0)
1962–1963	Harlow Town		
1963–1964	Cheshunt	37	(7)

International career
1957	England amateur	3	(3)
- * Club domestic league appearances and goals

Leslie William Champelovier (23 April 1933 – 28 January 2023) was an English footballer who played as an inside forward in the Football League for Brighton & Hove Albion. He was capped three times for the England amateur team.

== Life and career ==
Champelovier was born in Kensington and attended Wood End Park Junior School. He worked in the electronics industry, beginning as an instrument maker for EMI and then as a draughtsman for Cossor. He married Nora Leonard in 1958.

While on National Service duties, Champelovier played football for Ilford, and joined Hayes in 1954 after his discharge. In eight seasons with the club, he scored 137 goals from 266 games, and made numerous appearances in representative matches at various levels. In 1957, he was capped three times for the England amateur team, and scored a hat-trick on his debut, in a 5–0 win against Wales in the British Championship. He also toured with FA Amateur XIs and with Middlesex Wanderers.

He had played for Leyton Orient's reserve team, and in 1954 signed amateur forms for Chelsea, but his only appearance in the Football League was for Brighton & Hove Albion in the Third Division South in October 1957. Having moved to the Harlow area for work, Champelovier played for two seasons for Harlow Town and another one for Cheshunt before giving up the senior game.

Champelovier died in Essex on 28 January 2023 at the age of 89.
