= Reginald Popham =

English cricketer and footballer

Personal information
- Full name: Reginald Francis Popham
- Born: 8 January 1892; Kensington, London, England
- Died: 9 September 1975 (aged 83); Warnham, Sussex, England
- Batting: Right-handed
- Bowling: Unknown

Domestic team information
- Years: Team
- 1911–1924: Norfolk
- 1919: Marylebone Cricket Club

Career statistics
Competition	First-class
Matches	5
Runs scored	151
Batting average	30.20
100s/50s	–/1
Top score	52*
Balls bowled	12
Wickets	0
Bowling average	–
5 wickets in innings	–
10 wickets in match	–
Best bowling	–
Catches/stumpings	–/–
- Source: Cricinfo, 16 July 2019

Reginald Francis Popham (8 January 1892 – 9 September 1975) was an English first-class cricketer and footballer.

Popham was born at Kensington and educated at Repton School, before going up to Hertford College, Oxford. While studying at Oxford, he played football for Oxford University, captaining them in 1914. He also gained two England amateur international caps in 1914. He played minor counties cricket for Norfolk before the First World War, making 21 appearances in the Minor Counties Championship from 1911 to 1914. Popham served in the war with the Royal Norfolk Regiment, enlisting as a second lieutenant in November 1914. He was made a temporary lieutenant in December 1915, before being made a temporary captain in February 1917. He was made a full lieutenant in May 1917, while remaining a temporary captain. Popham resigned his commission in 1919.

He played first-class cricket for the Marylebone Cricket Club in 1919, making five appearances, in which he scored 151 runs with a high score of 52 not out. He continued to play minor counties for Norfolk after the war, making an additional eight appearances in the Minor Counties Championship from 1920 to 1924. He continued to play football too, making appearances for Norwich City (four Southern League games in 1913-14 and one in 1919-20) and Corinthian, in addition to gaining a third England amateur cap in 1920. He was later admitted to the London Stock Exchange. Popham died in September 1975 at Warnham, Sussex.
