= Mary Headlam =

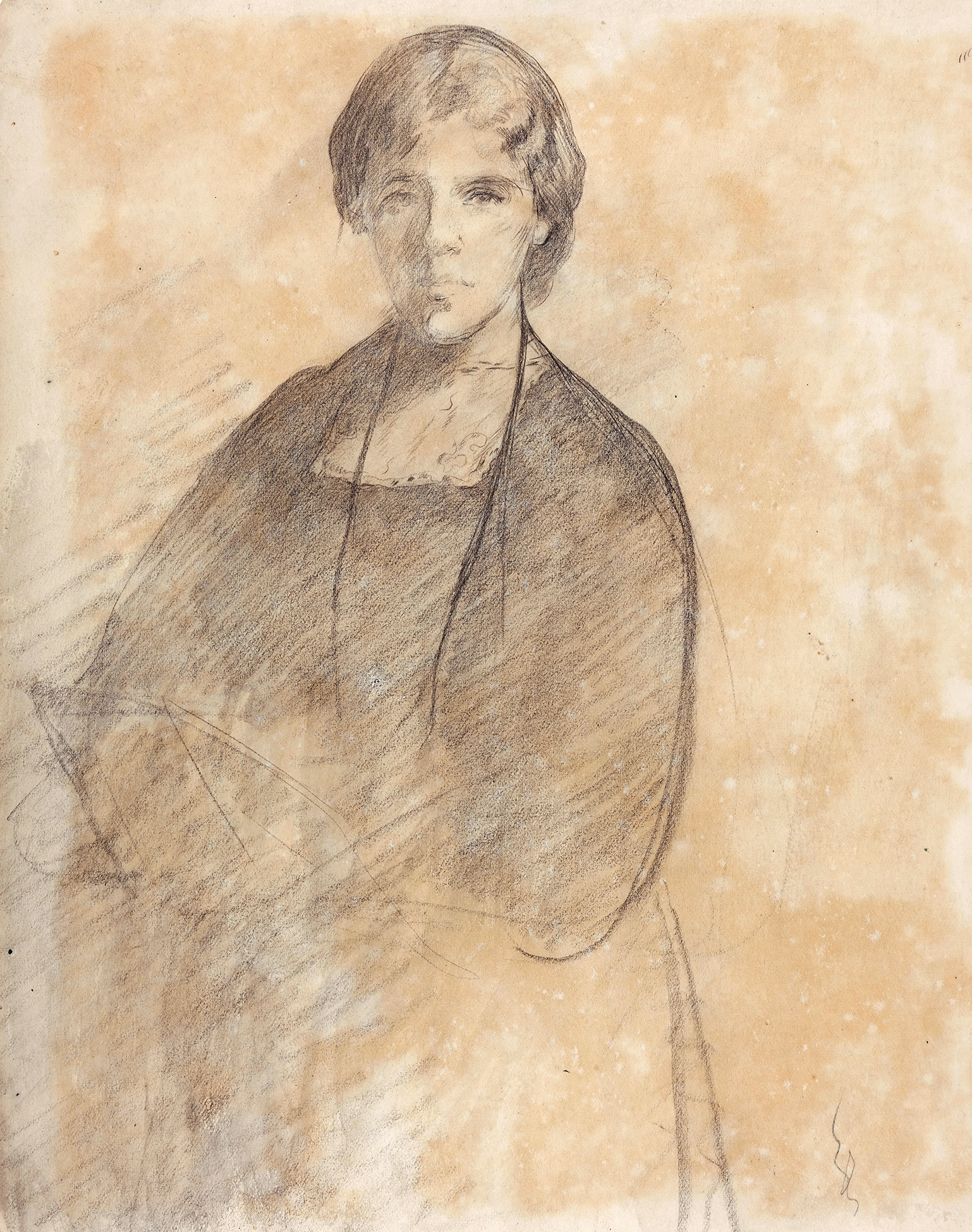
- Self Portrait, early 1900s
- Born: 16 July 1873; Horstead Hall, Norfolk, England
- Died: 16 March 1959 (aged 85); Rustingdon, Sussex, England
- Spouse: Horace Headlam (m. 1906; died 1936)

Mary Headlam (16 July 1873 – 16 March 1959) was a watercolour painter, printmaker and illustrator whose work belongs to the Romantic strand in British Art.

== Early life and art training ==
Born Mary Corbett in the Norfolk village of Horstead, Headlam was the seventh of the nine children of Admiral Sir John Corbett and Georgina Grace née Holmes. In 1884 the family moved to Kensington in London following her father’s appointment as Commander in Chief of the Nore, thereby becoming responsible for the UK’s national maritime operations. Encouraged by her father, who was himself an accomplished watercolourist, Headlam studied at the Slade School of Fine Art, London, between 1892 and 1896. Whilst there she was taught drawing by Henry Tonks, "the most renowned and formidable teacher of his generation." In 1894 Headlam was awarded a certificate for 'advanced drawing' of the Antique sculptures in the School's Cast Room. At the end of her third year of study she received further awards for drawing and painting the human figure. The influence of Headlam’s Slade training is evident in the proficient draughtsmanship which characterizes her oeuvre. Headlam studied alongside Nellie Syrett and Ethel Walker who both became lifelong friends.

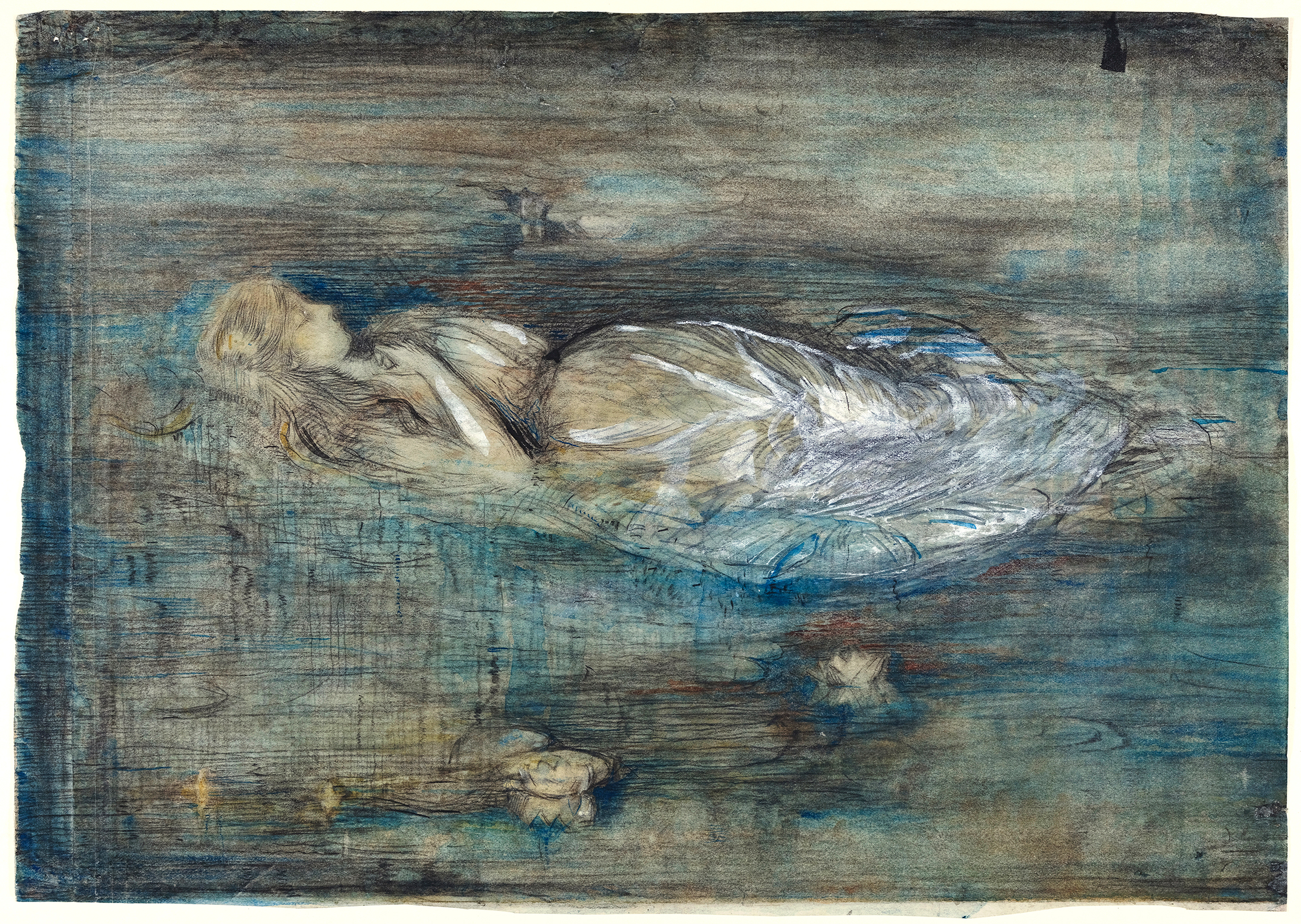
'And they smil'd on heaven' from James Hogg's Kilemeny

== Illustration ==
Following her graduation from the Slade, Headlam became involved in illustrative work. She was influenced in this direction through her friendship with Nellie Syrett and Syrett’s sisters Mabel, Kate and Netta. The Syrett sisters were part of a London-based community of writers and illustrators. In 1903 the publishers Lawrence and Bullen commissioned Headlam to illustrate Netta Syrett’s The Magic City and other Fairy Tales. In 1905 Headlam illustrated James Hogg’s Kilmeny for the publishers John Lane and Christina Denning’s story of Fluff in The Dream Garden; an anthology of children’s stories, plays and poems compiled by Netta Syrett, published by John Baillie At this time Headlam also produced many illustrations for the stories of Hans Christian Andersen, some of which she exhibited at London’s New English Art Club. In the early 1930s Headlam reworked many of these illustrations as wood engravings. Headlam’s evocative illustrations display an affinity with the work of Gabriel Rossetti and Sir Edward Burne-Jones. At this period she made a number of self portraits, as well as portraits of her family and close friends; generally in pen and ink occasionally highlighted with chalk and gauche.

== Marriage and landscape painting ==
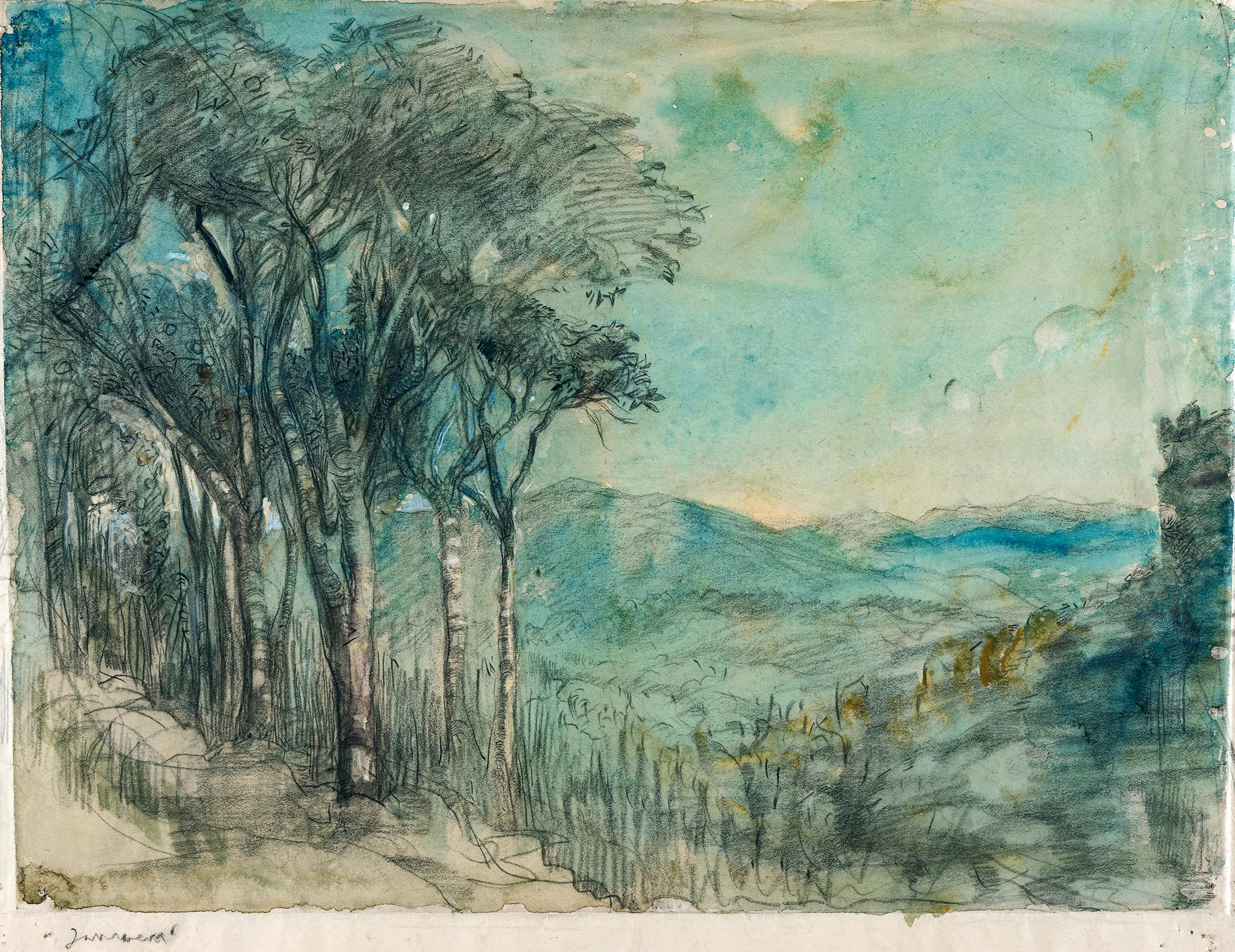
Jamaica, 1937

At St Botolph's Church Cambridge, on 14 June 1906, Mary married Horace Headlam. The couple met through Cambridge University connections: Mary’s brother William and Horace’s brother Walter Headlam were both Fellows of King’s College. Horace was a civil servant and later in his career became the Director of the Public Record Office. Marriage gave Headlam financial security, freeing her from the need to obtain regular commissions or sales. Thereafter, though remaining full committed to her art, she rarely exhibited or sold her work.

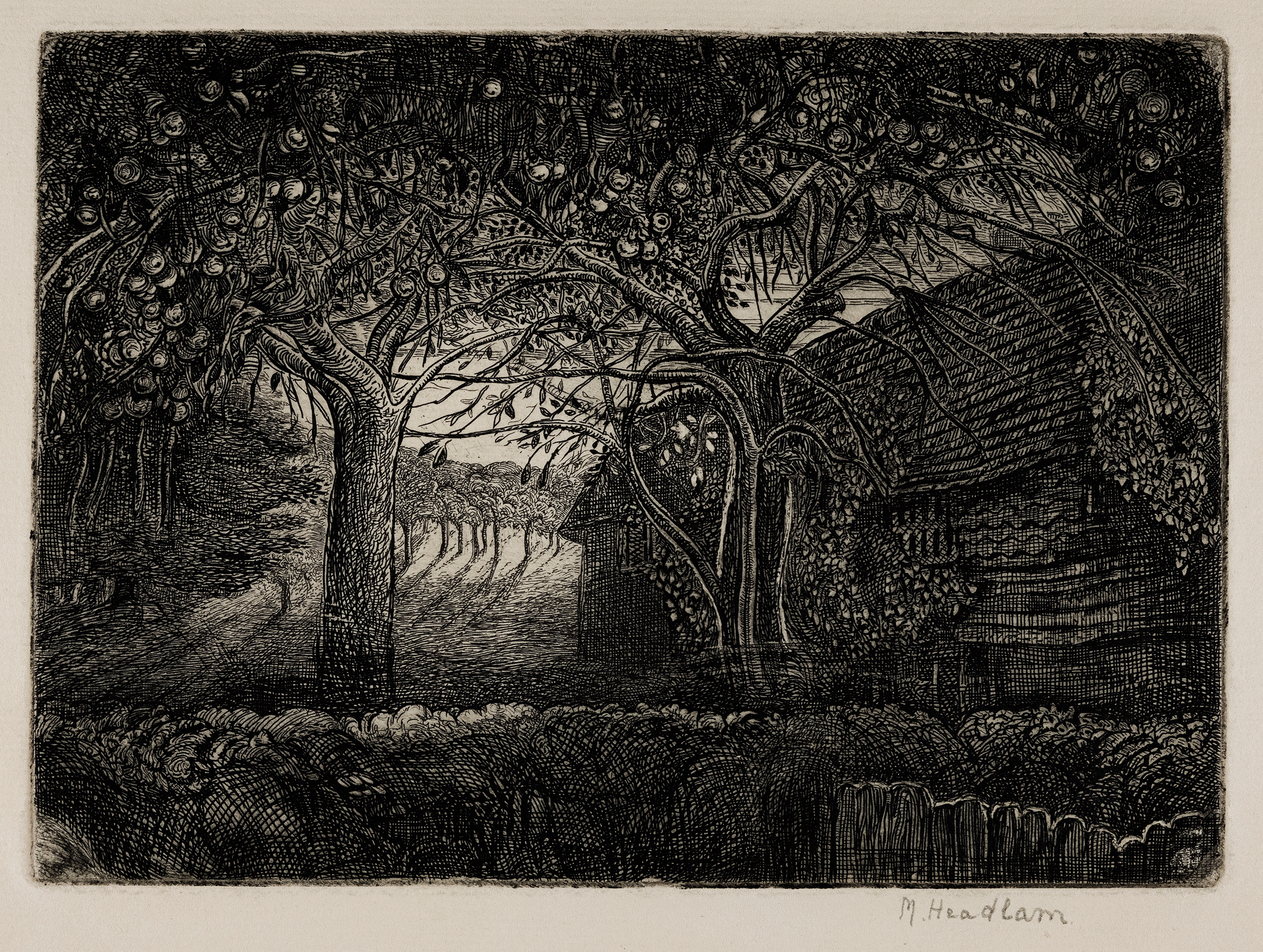
Apple Trees, late 1920s. Etching.

Following her marriage, landscape became the predominant subject of Headlam’s work. She principally chose to depict places where the Headlams had lived and worked such as London, Cambridge, Hampshire, Sussex and Devon, as well as views from the couple’s holidays in France and Italy. Her husband died on the 15th March 1936: the following winter Headlam visited Jamaica. The landscape of the Caribbean island became an important subject for her. An overview of Headlam’s landscape work reveals the development of a distinctive individual style, one which owed much to Samuel Palmer whose work was rediscovered in the mid 1920s, and which had a profound effect on Headlam and other artists of her generation. Palmer's influence is most evident in her etchings of the orchards and countryside of the South Downs. In constructing her watercolours Headlam would first make a detailed drawing in pen and ink, and then unify the work with washes of delicate colour, infusing each work with an atmospheric even mystical quality. A repeated subject of her later work is that of Chelsea Physic Garden in London where, during the late 1930s, she based herself, in a flat overlooking the garden. In 1942, to escape the London Blitz, Headlam moved to Kingswear in Devon alongside the River Dart. With its wooded banks and the ruined Dartmouth Castle perched above it, the river became a favourite subject for her watercolours; painted in the soft, diffuse light of dawn and dusk.

== Final years and afterwards ==
In 1954 Headlam returned to London where she passed the final five years of her life. Headlam died on 16 March 1959. Since her death there have been two retrospective exhibitions of her work. In 1983 Anne Goodchild (1946–2023) curated an exhibition of Headlam’s work at the Graves Art Gallery, Sheffield, and in December 2024 Abbott and Holder, London, mounted a further extensive exhibition of the artist’s work.
