= Here They Come =

Song
- Language: English
- Published: 1917
- Songwriter(s): Arthur Bergh

Here They Come is a World War I song in the style of a march written and composed by Arthur Bergh. It was published in 1917 by Jos. W. Stern & Co. in New York, NY. The sheet music cover, illustrated by Starmer, has a large photo of troops parading down a city street.

The sheet music can be found at the Pritzker Military Museum & Library.
