= Kensington Barracks =

- Kensington
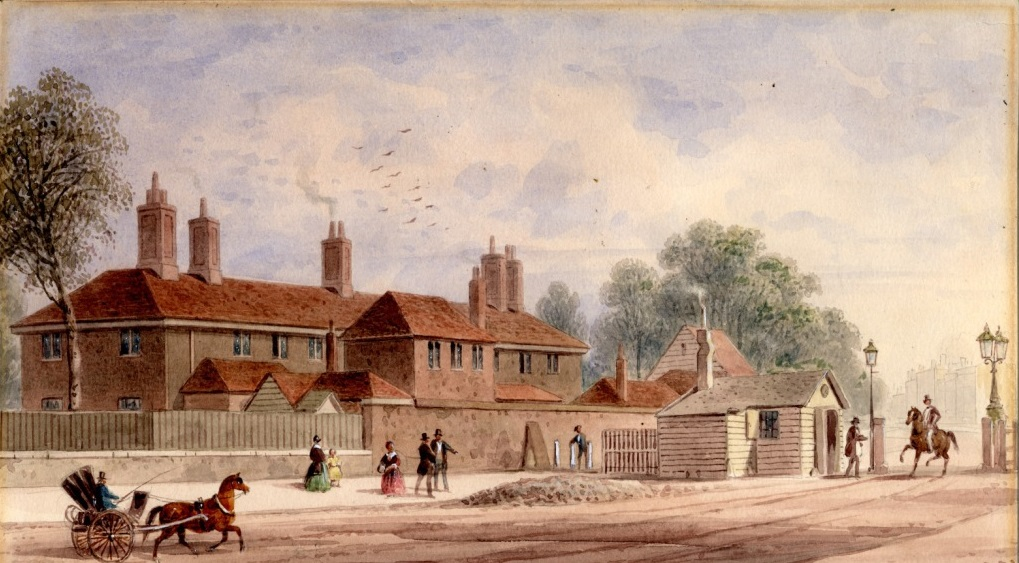
- The original Kensington Barracks at Kensington Gate by Thomas H. Shepherd, c.1840

Site information
- Type: Barracks
- Owner: War Office
- Operator: British Army

Location
- Location within London
- Coordinates: 51.50230°N 0.18634°W

Site history
- Built: Late 18th century
- Built for: War Office
- In use: Late 18th century-1858 (old barracks); 1858–1972 (new barracks)

Kensington Barracks was a military installation in Kensington, London.

== History ==
The original barracks were built in the late 18th century at Kensington Gate to accommodate cavalry regiments. King William IV is known to have ridden past the barracks on a charger as he went to inspect the London Volunteers at Hyde Park on 26 October 1803. They became unsightly and there was pressure in Parliament to remove the barracks in August 1857. The old barracks were demolished the following year and new barracks were built in Kensington Church Street. The new site had cavalry barracks on the west side of the site and infantry barracks on the east side. The new barracks were demolished in 1972 and the site was redeveloped in the late 1980s as Lancer Square.
