= Arthur Bergh =

American composer

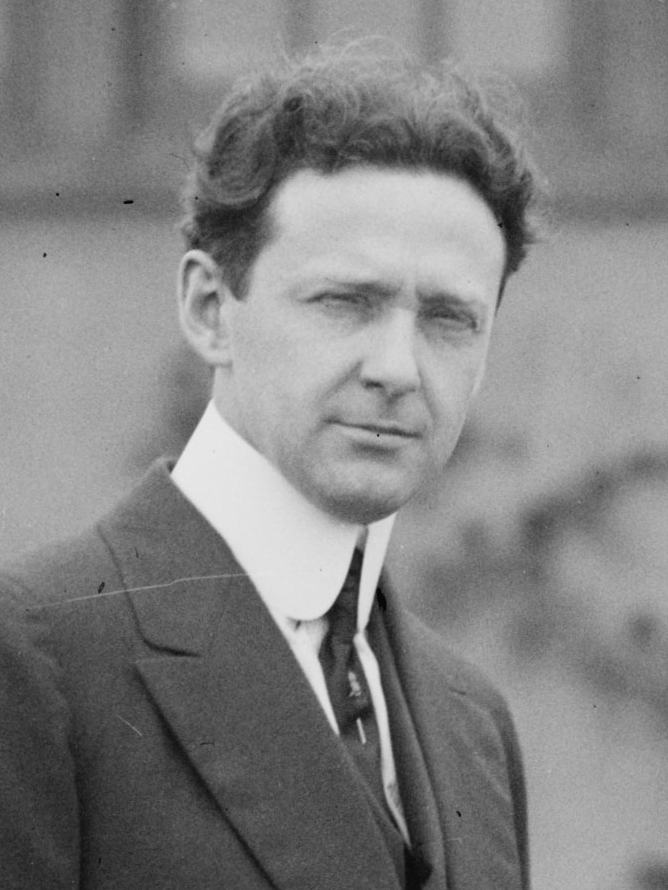
- Bergh in 1915

Background information
- Born: March 24, 1882; Saint Paul, Minnesota
- Died: February 11, 1962 (aged 79) Los Angeles, California
- Occupations: Composer; conductor; accompanist
- Instruments: Piano; violin; organ
- Spouse: Geraldyne Brewer (m. 1901)

Arthur Oscar Bergh (March 24, 1882 – February 11, 1962) was an American composer, conductor and accompanist. He performed on the piano, violin and organ.

Bergh was born in Saint Paul, Minnesota. From 1903 to 1908 he was a violinist with the Metropolitan Opera. In 1914, he was the conductor of the orchestra in New York City's Central Park. Bergh became the recording manager at Emerson Records in 1916; he had previously been employed by Columbia Records, and was convinced to move to Victor Emerson's new company after Emerson himself left Columbia. Other sources state that Bergh worked with Emerson first (1915 to 1922), following which he worked at Columbia (1922 to 1930).

In his later life, Bergh worked as a librarian with Hollywood film companies. He died in Los Angeles on February 11, 1962.

Bergh's wife, Geraldyne Brewer (1901–1998), was an heiress in social and charitable circles in 1950s Los Angeles. In 1956, they lived at 9823 Kincardine Avenue in Cheviot Hills, Los Angeles. After Bergh's death, Geraldyne married Los Angeles Superior Court judge McIntyre Faries on December 3, 1965. Geraldyne died in 1998 and was buried in Forest Lawn Memorial Park, Glendale.

== Works ==
He composed a number of operas and operettas, including adaptations of Robert Browning's The Pied Piper of Hamelin and Edgar Allan Poe's The Raven. His Lieder include music to Walt Whitman's The Imprisoned Soul (1939), Percy Bysshe Shelley's Music, When Soft Voices Die (1947), Emily Dickinson's The Grass (1954), and John Greenleaf Whittier's Dear Lord and Father of Mankind (1955).

Bergh's other works include a symphonic chorale entitled The Unnamed City; a romantic opera, Niorada; a march for orchestra, Honor and Glory (1939); two operettas, In Arcady and The Goblin Fair; a chorus entitled O Captain, My Captain; a cycle named The Congo; as well as 80 other pieces for violin and piano.

- 1908 – The Raven, Op. 20 (Edgar Allan Poe)
- 1910 – December, Op. 9 No. 1 (Thomas Bailey Aldrich)
- 1913 – Evening, a Reverie, Op. 15, No. 1
- 1913 – Meditation in A♭, Op. 15, No. 2
- 1913 – Serenade Coquette, Op. 15, No. 3
- 1913 – Here They Come
- 1914 – The Pied Piper of Hamelin, Op. 23 (Robert Browning)
- 1915 – Four Tone Pastels, Op. 17
- 1919 – Vesper Song (Cordelia Brooks Fenno)
- 1919 – The Goblin Fair (Cordelia Brooks Fenno)
- 1924 – In Arcady
- 1926 – Concert Suite for the Pianoforte
- 1941 – Love Is the Light of the World (Paul Laurence Dunbar)
- 1938 – Honor and Glory, Op. 30
- 1938 – Destiny
- 1938 – O Captain! My Captain!
- 1939 – The Imprisoned Soul (Walt Whitman)
- 1941 – Kissing Her Hair I Sat Against Her Feet (Algernon Charles Swinburne)
- 1941 – Come With Arms Outstretched (Sara Teasdale)
- 1947 – Music, When Soft Voices Die, Op. 37 (Percy Bysshe Shelley)
- 1950 – A Tragic Story (William Makepeace Thackeray)
- 1950 – I Heard the Bells on Christmas Day (Henry Wadsworth Longfellow)
- 1954 – The Grass (Emily Dickinson)
- 1955 – Dear Lord and Father of Mankind (John Greenleaf Whittier)
