= Tali Esen Morgan =

Welsh-born American conductor, composer, and publisher

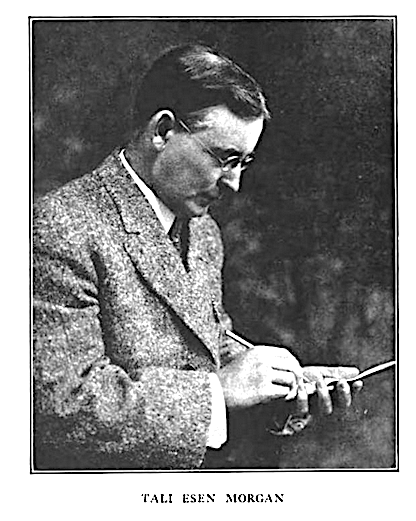
Tali Esen Morgan during his Ocean Grove years

Tali Esen Morgan (28 October 1858 – June 1941), born Taliesen Morgan, was a Welsh-born American conductor, composer, and publisher. He was the musical director at Ocean Grove, a large Methodist summer resort on the New Jersey shore, for almost twenty years.

== Early life ==
Taliesen Morgan was born at Llangynwyd, Glamorganshire, one of ten children of Thomas Llyfnwy Morgan and Gwenllian Beven Morgan. He attended schools in Maesteg, and held an apprenticeship with a printer. He settled with his family in Scranton, Pennsylvania in 1876, for three years. Although he was very young, he published a Welsh-interest newspaper, The Cambro-American, while there.

== Career ==
In 1897, Morgan directed choirs for a summer concert at Ocean Grove. The following year, he became the resort's musical director. Conductor Walter Damrosch encouraged him to use "Tali Esen" rather than the original version of his first name. As musical director, he worked with visiting artists such as Enrico Caruso, John Philip Sousa, Lillian Nordica, and Louise Homer. He was responsible for a thousand-voice children's chorus, and a 63-piece orchestra.

He oversaw the purchase and installation of the Robert Hope-Jones organ in the Great Auditorium in 1908. He composed the "Storm Fantasia" for the Hope-Jones organ, and that piece played regularly in the Great Auditorium for many years; it was a staple offering of other theatre organ recitals too.

Morgan continued as musical director at Ocean Grove until 1915. Morgan was also music director at Second Presbyterian Church in Pittsburgh. He conducted the New York Festival Chorus, and was president of the International Correspondence School of Music.

After Ocean Grove, Morgan co-directed the Asbury Park Summer School in 1917. In 1919 he conducted a large girls' chorus at the Baptist Temple in Brooklyn.

Morgan composed or arranged many works for choral performance. He published a Methodist hymnal based on the songs sung at Ocean Grove.

== Personal life ==
Tali Esen Morgan married Mary Jane Jones in 1881. They had six children. One son, Paul Morgan, died in 1929, at age 33. Another son, Kays Richard Morgan, became a lawyer in New Jersey. Tali Esen Morgan was widowed in 1938. He died in summer 1941, age 82, after a heart attack at his daughter Edith's house in New York.
