= Frank Ward (cricketer, born 1865) =

English cricketer

Frank Ward (9 January 1865 – unknown) was an English cricketer active from 1884 to 1896 who played for Lancashire. He was born in Carlisle. He appeared in 47 first-class matches as a righthanded batsman who bowled right arm medium pace. He scored 986 runs with a highest score of 145 and held 11 catches. He took 27 wickets with a best analysis of four for 14.
