= Frank Ward (cricketer, born 1888) =

English cricketer and British Army soldier

Personal information
- Full name: Frank Ward
- Born: 3 June 1888; Kensington, Middlesex, England
- Died: 1 March 1952 (aged 63); Worthing, Sussex, England
- Batting: Unknown
- Bowling: Unknown

Career statistics
Competition	First-class
Matches	4
Runs scored	28
Batting average	4.66
100s/50s	–/–
Top score	10
Balls bowled	187
Wickets	2
Bowling average	42.00
5 wickets in innings	–
10 wickets in match	–
Best bowling	1/9
Catches/stumpings	–/–
- Source: Cricinfo, 14 April 2019

Frank Ward (3 June 1888 – 1 March 1952) was an English first-class cricketer and British Army soldier.

Ward made four appearances in first-class cricket for the British Army cricket team, debuting against Oxford University at Oxford in 1926, with Ward making further first-class appearance in the same season against Cambridge University at Fenner's. He made two further first-class appearances for the Army in 1927, against the Royal Navy and the touring New Zealanders. In his four first-class appearances, he scored a total of 28 runs, while with the ball he took 2 wickets.

He died at Worthing in March 1952.
