= Joseph H. Conlin =

Joseph H. Conlin (February 12, 1928 – March 5, 2007) was an American impresario and opera director. Born in Chicago to Joseph H. Conlin, Sr. and Mary Reichert-Conlin, Conlin founded Conlin Associates, a New York-based talent management agency, which presented many important European artists via United States tours, including Beniamino Gigli, Jussi Björling, and Renata Tebaldi, as well as numerous American and international artists, including violinist Rony Rogoff, pianist Sylvia Zaremba, Sherill Milnes, Roberta Peters, Victoria Livengood, and the piano duo DeMaio and Silver, as well as many competition winners including piano competitions from Cincinnati, Palm Beach, New York and the National Chopin Piano Competition, whose winners went on to compete in the Chopin International Competition in Warsaw. He also served as the General Director of the Palm Beach Opera during the 1980s. At the time of his death in West Palm Beach, Florida he was president of the Musicians' Club of New York and was still active as a concert presenter and cruise organizer.
