= Frank Alan Ward =

Distinguished professor and author

Distinguished Achievement Professor Frank Alan Ward PhD.
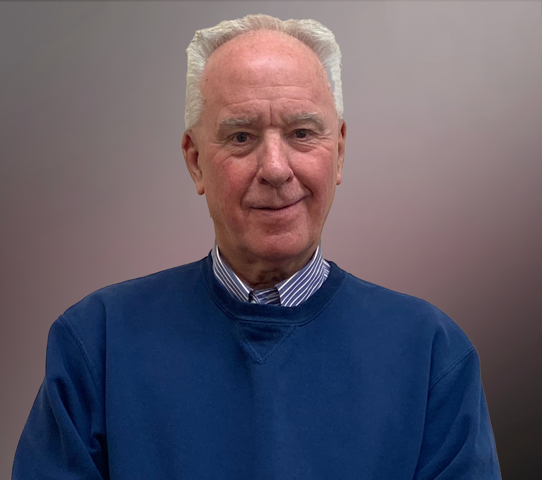
- Frank Ward (2024)
- Born: October 8, 1948 (age 78)
- Occupations: Professor, scientist, researcher, author
- Known for: Environmental, agricultural and water resources economics
- Spouse: (since 2001)
- Children: 4, Ryan, Cordelia, Hilary, Evelyn
- Parent(s): John (deceased) and Jane Ward
- Awards: American Agricultural Economics Association: Dissertation Award, 1978; Western Agricultural Economics Association: Elected Fellow, 2021; DARE Hall of Fame in 2022; Colorado State University: Lifetime Achievement Award, 2022; top 2 percent of scientists awarded by Stanford University

Academic background
- Education: PhD.
- Thesis: [thesis website 'The Welfare Effects of a Market Allocation of an Exhaustible Resource'] (1977)
- Doctoral advisor: John R. McKean
- Other advisor: S. Lee Gray
- Influences: Robert Solow, Harold Hotelling

Academic work
- Era: post 1978
- Discipline: environmental economist
- School or tradition: water science and management
- Institutions: New Mexico State University (1978–current)
- Main interests: water resource economics, environmental economics, natural resource economics
- Notable works: see Google scholar
- Website: Frank Ward

Frank Alan Ward is an economist and academic contributor to the fields of environmental and water resource economics. He is a Distinguished Achievement Professor at New Mexico State University in the College of Agriculture, Consumer, and Environmental Science where he has been teaching since 1978. He has authored over 115 peer-reviewed articles in journals, two books, and several book chapters. He was inducted in the DARE Hall of Fame in 2022 for his lifetime achievements and contributions at the state, national and/or international level.

== Background ==
Ward received his B.S. degree in economics at Colorado State University in 1970, his MS in economics at Colorado State University in 1975, and his PhD in economics at Colorado State University in 1978. His PhD dissertation, “The Welfare Effects of a Market Allocation of an Exhaustible Resource,” won an American Agricultural Economics Dissertation Award for 1978.

== Academic career ==
Since completing his PhD he has been assistant professor of Natural resource economics (1978–1983), associate professor of natural resource economics (1983–1987)professor of natural resource economics (1988–2011), and distinguished achievement professor of natural resource economics (2011–present) at New Mexico State University.

By 2024, Ward has authored more than 115 peer-refereed articles in journals and two books as well as a number of book chapters. He is one of the most heavily cited resource economists in citations to journal articles. His papers consistently appear in top scientific, environmental, and natural resource journals and he has more than 5,000 Google Scholar citations, four contributions with more than 200 citations each and over 10 with more than 100 citations.

His research focuses on water resource economics, climate change adaptation, management of depletable resources, and institutional analysis of surface water and aquifers for several of the world's major river basins. Some of these basins include the Colorado, Rio Grande, Missouri, High Plains Ogallala domestically, as well as the Nile, Tigris-Euphrates, Jordan, and Amu-Darya internationally.

Some of the research projects he has worked on include assessing and managing surface water system as well as aquifers in countries like Israel, Mauritania, Costa Rica, Iraq, Afghanistan, and Kenya. His work has also focused on reducing economic costs caused by drought and climate change, as well as a 2024 work investigating economically sustainable solutions for pumping in the High Plains Ogallala Aquifer. In 2022, he received a lifetime achievement award from Colorado State University.

During his tenure at NMSU, Ward was designated in 2011 as a Distinguished Achievement Professor, acknowledging his achievements in scholarly research, teaching and mentoring of students. He was recently ranked in the top two percent of scientists worldwide by Stanford University and Elsevier. He is an elected Western Agricultural Economics Association Fellow in 2021. Within these roles, Dr. Ward believes that the most rewarding aspects are being able to assist students with opportunities to help them achieve their career ambitions, seek the recognition they deserve, and discover their potential beyond what they would have achieved on their own.

== Publications (selected) ==
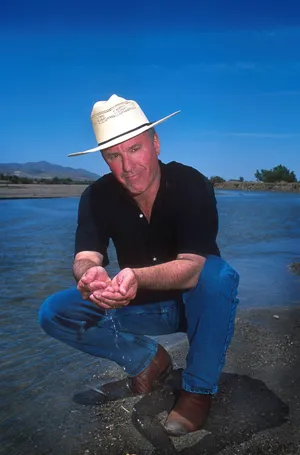
Frank Ward, PhD. on location as a natural resource economist.

FA Ward, M Pulido-Velazquez, “Water conservation in irrigation can increase water use,” Proceedings of the National Academy of Sciences 105 (47), 18215–18220

FA Ward and D Beal, Valuing Nature with Travel Cost Models (Book), Edward Elgar (UK), 2000

FA Ward, Environmental and Natural Resource Economics (Book), Prentice-Hall, 2006

FA Ward, A Michelsen, “The economic value of water in agriculture: concepts and policy applications,” Water Policy 4 (5), 423–446

FA Ward, JB Loomis, “The travel cost demand model as an environmental policy assessment tool: a review of literature,” Western Journal of Agricultural Economics, (11), 164–178

JF Booker, AM Michelsen, FA Ward, “Economic impact of alternative policy responses to prolonged and severe drought in the Rio Grande Basin,” Water Resources Research 41 (2)

FA Ward, JF Booker, AM Michelsen, “Integrated economic, hydrologic, and institutional analysis of policy responses to mitigate drought impacts in Rio Grande Basin,” Journal of Water Resources Planning and Management 132 (6), 488–502

J Loomis, B Roach, F Ward, R Ready, “Testing transferability of recreation demand models across regions: a study of Corps of Engineer reservoirs,“ Water Resources Research 31 (3), 721–730

M Dagnino, FA Ward, “Economics of agricultural water conservation: empirical analysis and policy implications,” International Journal of Water Resources Development 28 (4), 577–600

SM Jalilov, M Keskinen, O Varis, S Amer, FA Ward, “Managing the water–energy–food nexus: Gains and losses from new water development in Amu Darya River Basin,” Journal of Hydrology 539, 648–661

FA Ward, M Pulido-Velazquez, “Efficiency, equity, and sustainability in a water quantity–quality optimization model in the Rio Grande basin,” Ecological Economics 66 (1), 23–37

FA Ward, “Economics of water allocation to instream uses in a fully appropriated river basin: Evidence from a New Mexico wild river,” Water Resources Research 23 (3), 381-392
