= Frank Edwin Ward =

American composer and organist

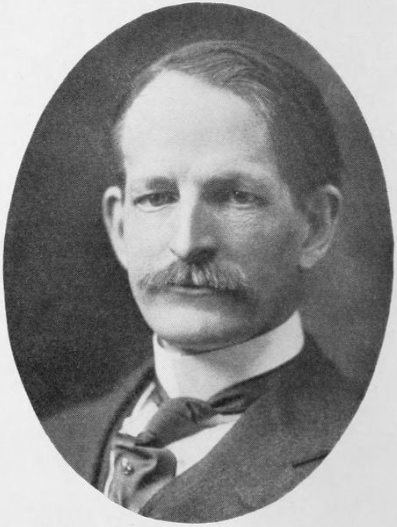
- Born: October 7, 1872; Wysox, Pennsylvania, US
- Died: September 16, 1953 (aged 80); Wolfeboro, New Hampshire, US
- Education: Columbia University
- Occupations: Composer, organist

Frank Edwin Ward (October 7, 1872 – September 16, 1953) was an American composer and organist.

== Biography ==
Born in Wysox, Pennsylvania, he was the son of writer Cyrenus Osborne Ward, and the nephew of Lester Frank Ward. He was educated at Columbia University, and later served as its organist for some time. He wrote some works for orchestra and a deal of chamber music in addition to church music, cantatas, and songs. He was a pupil of Edward MacDowell.

He died at his summer home at Wolfeboro, New Hampshire on September 16, 1953.
