= Ernestine Schumann-Heink =

Austrian-American singer (1861–1936)

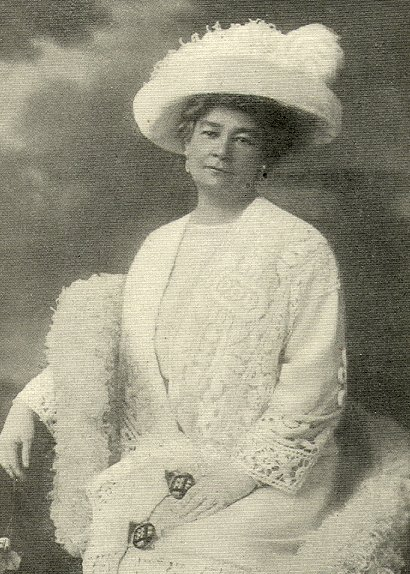
- Born: Ernestine Amalie Pauline Rössler; 15 June 1861; Libeň, Kingdom of Bohemia, Austrian Empire
- Died: 17 November 1936 (aged 75); Hollywood, California, United States
- Other name: Tina Rössler
- Occupation: Singer
- Years active: 1876–1932
- Spouses: Johann Georg Ernst August Heink (m. 1882–1893) Curt Paul Schumann (m. 1895–1904) William Rapp, Jr. (m. 1905–1915)
- Children: August (1883–1918); Charlotte (1884–?); Henry (1886–1951); Hans Hugo Herman (1887–1916); Ferdinand (1893–1958); Marie (1896–?); George Washington (1898–1979); Walter Schumann
- Parent(s): Hans Rössler; Charlotte Goldman

Ernestine Schumann-Heink (15 June 1861 – 17 November 1936) was a Bohemian-born Austrian-American operatic dramatic contralto of German Bohemian descent. She was noted for the flexibility and wide range of her voice. Heink and Schumann were her two husbands' surnames.

== Early life ==
She was born Ernestine Amalie Pauline Rössler on 15 June 1861 to a German-speaking family at Libeň (German: Lieben), Bohemia, Austrian Empire, which is now part of the city of Prague, Czech Republic. She was baptized in her father's Roman Catholic faith five days later. Her father, who called his daughter "Tini", was Johann "Hans" Rössler. Before working as a shoe maker, he served as an Austrian cavalry officer. He had been stationed in northern Italy (then an Austrian protectorate), where he met and married Charlotte Josepha Goldman, who was Jewish and with whom he returned to Libeň. Her maternal grandmother, Leah Kohn, was of Hungarian Jewish descent and first prophesied Ernestine's successful career.

When Ernestine was three years old, the family moved to Verona. In 1866, at the outbreak of the Austro-Prussian War, the family moved to Prague, where she was schooled at the Ursuline Convent. At war's end, the Roesslers moved to Podgórze, now part of Kraków, where she attended convent school. The family moved again to Graz when Ernestine was thirteen. Here she met Marietta von LeClair, a retired opera singer, who agreed to give her voice lessons.

In 1876, Ernestine gave her first professional performance (at age 15) as alto soloist in Beethoven's Ninth Symphony in Graz. Her operatic debut was on 15 October 1878 at the Dresden Royal Opera House, where for four seasons she played the role of Azucena in Il trovatore, and served as principal contralto when she was 17.

== First marriage ==
In 1882 she married Johann Georg Ernst Albert Heink (1854–1933), secretary of the Semperoper, the Saxon State Opera Dresden; this violated the terms of their contracts, and both had their employment abruptly terminated. Heink took a job at the local customs house and was soon transferred to Hamburg. Ernestine remained in Dresden to pursue her career, and eventually rejoined her husband when she secured a position at the Hamburg Opera. She went on to have four children with Heink: August, Charlotte, Henry and Hans.

Ernest Heink was again thrown out of work when Saxons were banned from government positions, and departed to Saxony to find work. Ernestine, pregnant, did not follow him; they were divorced in 1892 when Ernestine was thirty-one years old. She came to the United States to make a brief foray into Broadway theatre, playing in Julian Edwards' operetta Love's Lottery, in which her performance was noted for the fact that she often broke off to ask the audience whether her English was good enough. She left the production after 50 performances and soon returned to opera.

Her breakthrough to leading roles came after an argument between prima donna Marie Goetze and the director of the Hamburg opera, when he asked Ernestine to sing the title role of Carmen instead, and without rehearsal, which she did to great acclaim. Goetze angrily quit the role of Fidès in Le prophète, to be performed the following night, and was again replaced by Schumann-Heink who for a third time replaced Goetze as Ortrud in Lohengrin the following evening, one more time without rehearsal, and was offered a ten-year contract.

In 1887, Schumann-Heink sang Johannes Brahms' Alto Rhapsody under the direction of Hans von Bülow in a concert in Hamburg, with Brahms in attendance. She was then engaged by Bülow to sing in a cycle of Mozart performances later that year. However, she had to withdraw from these performances due to the birth of her fourth child, Hans, in November 1887. This withdrawal angered Bülow, and their relationship did not continue.

== Second marriage ==
After the divorce from her first husband, she married Paul Schumann, an actor and director of the Thalia Theater in Hamburg in 1892. She acquired a stepson, Walter, and had three more children with Paul: Ferdinand Schumann, Marie Theresa Schumann, and George Washington Schumann. This last boy was born in New York City, named by his good-humored mother with suggestion of the doctor who delivered the baby. One of their children, Ferdinand (1893–1958) was a prolific, though mostly unbilled, Hollywood character actor.

Paul Schumann died in Germany on 28 November 1904. While fighting a legal battle in Germany over her husband's estate, she filed her United States naturalization papers on 10 February 1905, and became a U.S. citizen on 3 March 1908.

== International career ==
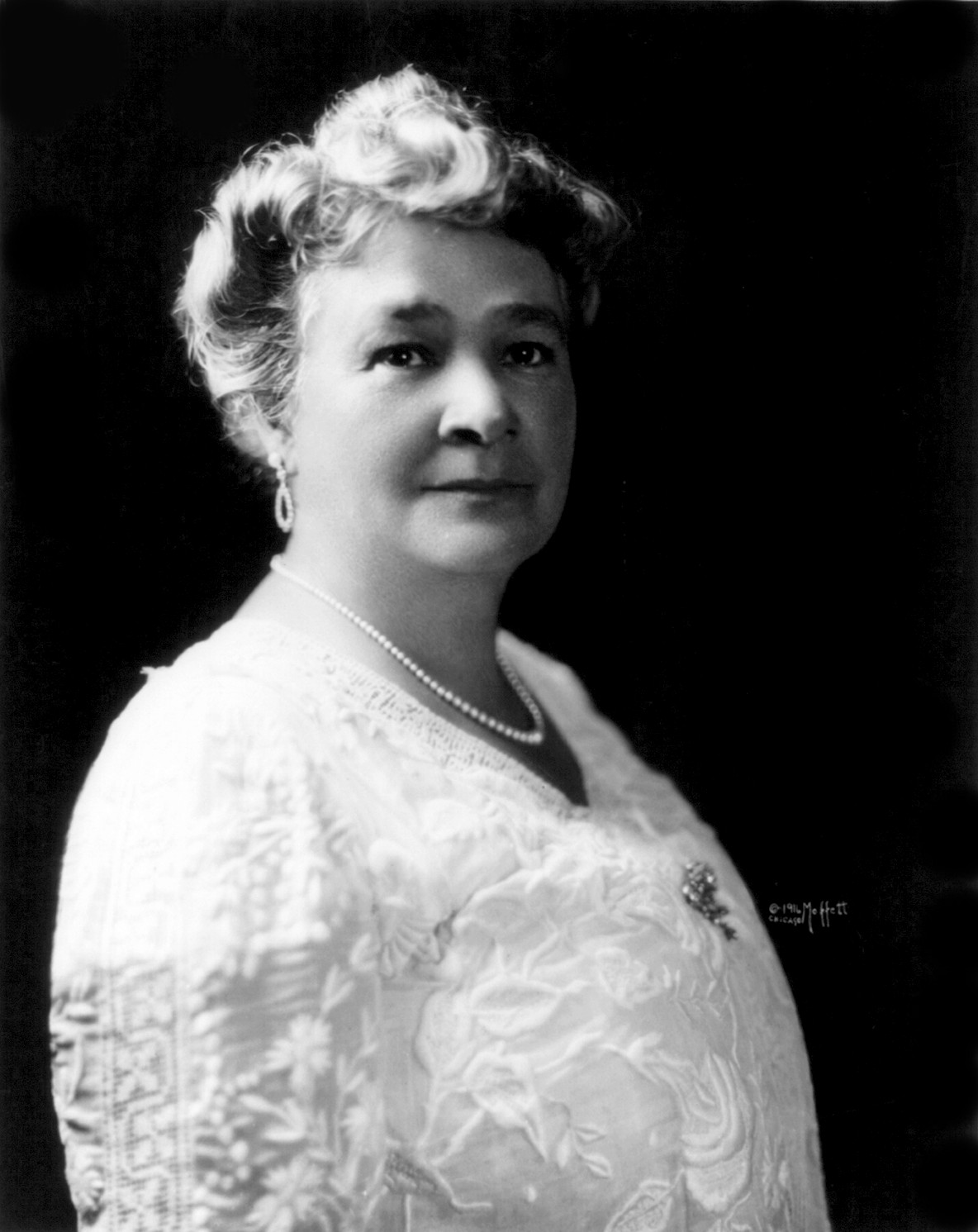
Schumann-Heink in 1916

"Erlkönig"
Schumann-Heink sings Schubert's "Erlkönig" in 1913, accompanied by a string ensemble

Schumann-Heink performed with Gustav Mahler at the Royal Opera House, Covent Garden, during the Hamburg company's London season in 1892, and became well known for her performances of the works of Richard Wagner, forging "a long and fruitful relationship with [the Annual] Bayreuth [Wagnerian music Festival]" that "lasted from 1896 to 1914".

Schumann-Heink's first appearance at the Metropolitan Opera in New York City was in 1899, and she performed regularly there until 1932. She recorded the first of her many musical gramophone performances in 1900. Several of these early sound recordings originally released on 78 RPM discs have been reissued on CD format. Although there are some imperfections in her singing, her technical brilliance still leaves a deep impression on listeners.

== Third marriage ==
On 11 February 1905, Schumann-Heink became an American citizen. On 27 May 1905, aged 43, she married her manager William Rapp Jr., son of Wilhelm Rapp, in Chicago, Illinois. They lived on Grandview Avenue, North Caldwell, New Jersey in her Villa Fides from April 1906 to December 1911. They then moved to 500 acres (2.0 km^{2}) of farm land located just outside San Diego, California, purchased by her in January 1910, where she would live for most of the rest of her life.

In 1909, she created the role of Klytaemnestra in the debut of Richard Strauss's Elektra, of which she said she had no high opinion, calling it "a fearful din". Strauss was not entirely captivated by Schumann-Heink either; according to one story, during rehearsals he admonished the orchestra, "Louder! I can still hear Madame Schumann-Heink!"

She separated from her husband on 10 December 1911. She filed for divorce in 1913. They divorced in 1914 and the appeals court upheld the lower court decision in 1915. In 1915, she appeared as herself in the early documentary film Mabel and Fatty Viewing the World's Fair at San Francisco directed by Fatty Arbuckle, who appears as himself in the film.

Around the time of filming the documentary, on July 30th 1915, Mme. Schumann-Heink was stopped and cited for speeding in Santa Ana, CA. The San Francisco Chronicle published the story titled: ‘Outrage,’ Says Diva Nabbed for Speeding.

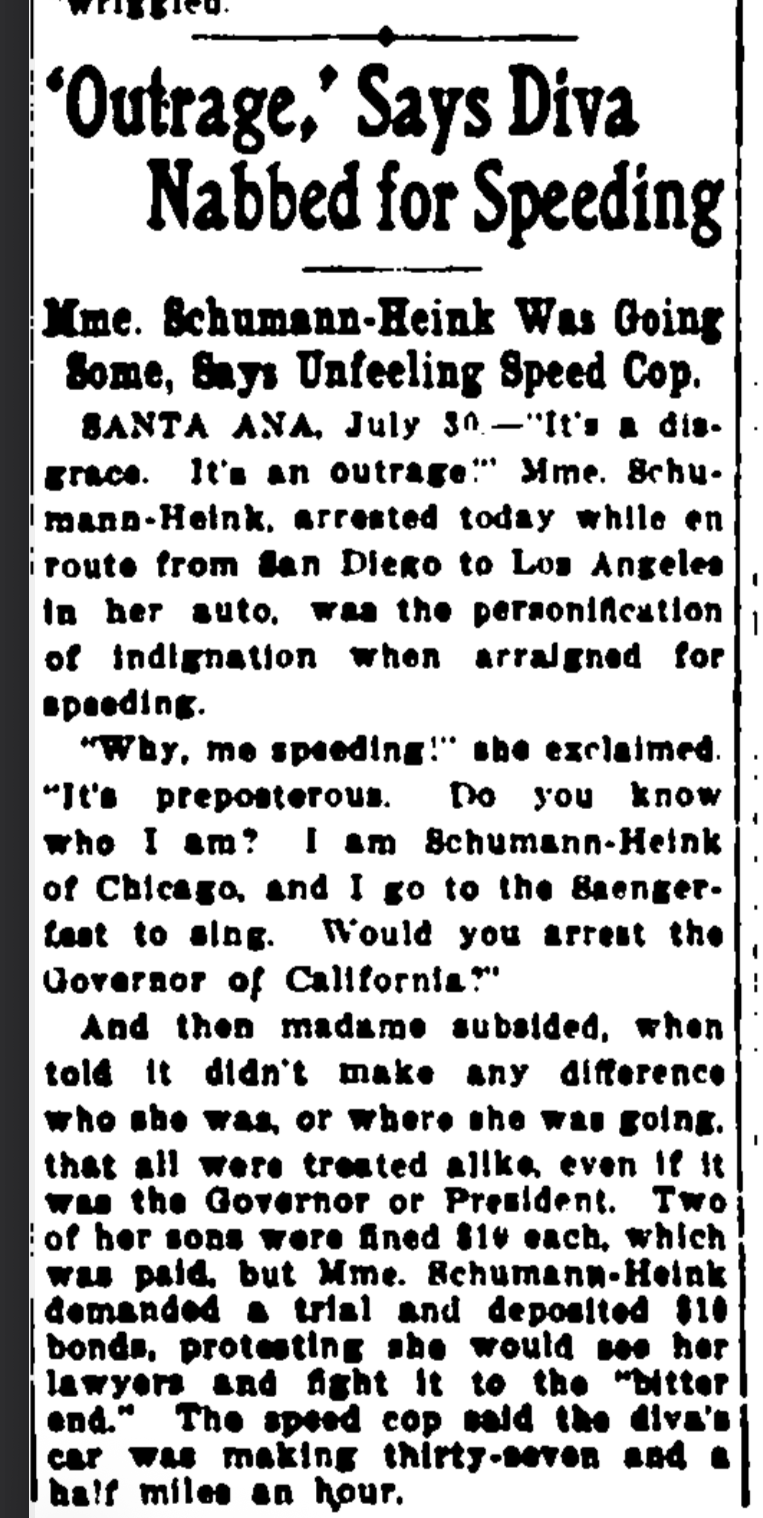
July 30, 1915, a story in the San Francisco Chronicle reports on Mme. Schumann-Heink being stopped for speeding in Santa Ana, CA, and her complaint

== Charitable work and community support ==
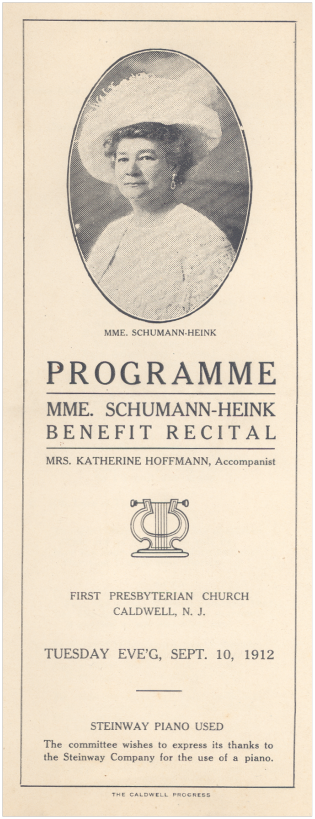
Concert program from 1912

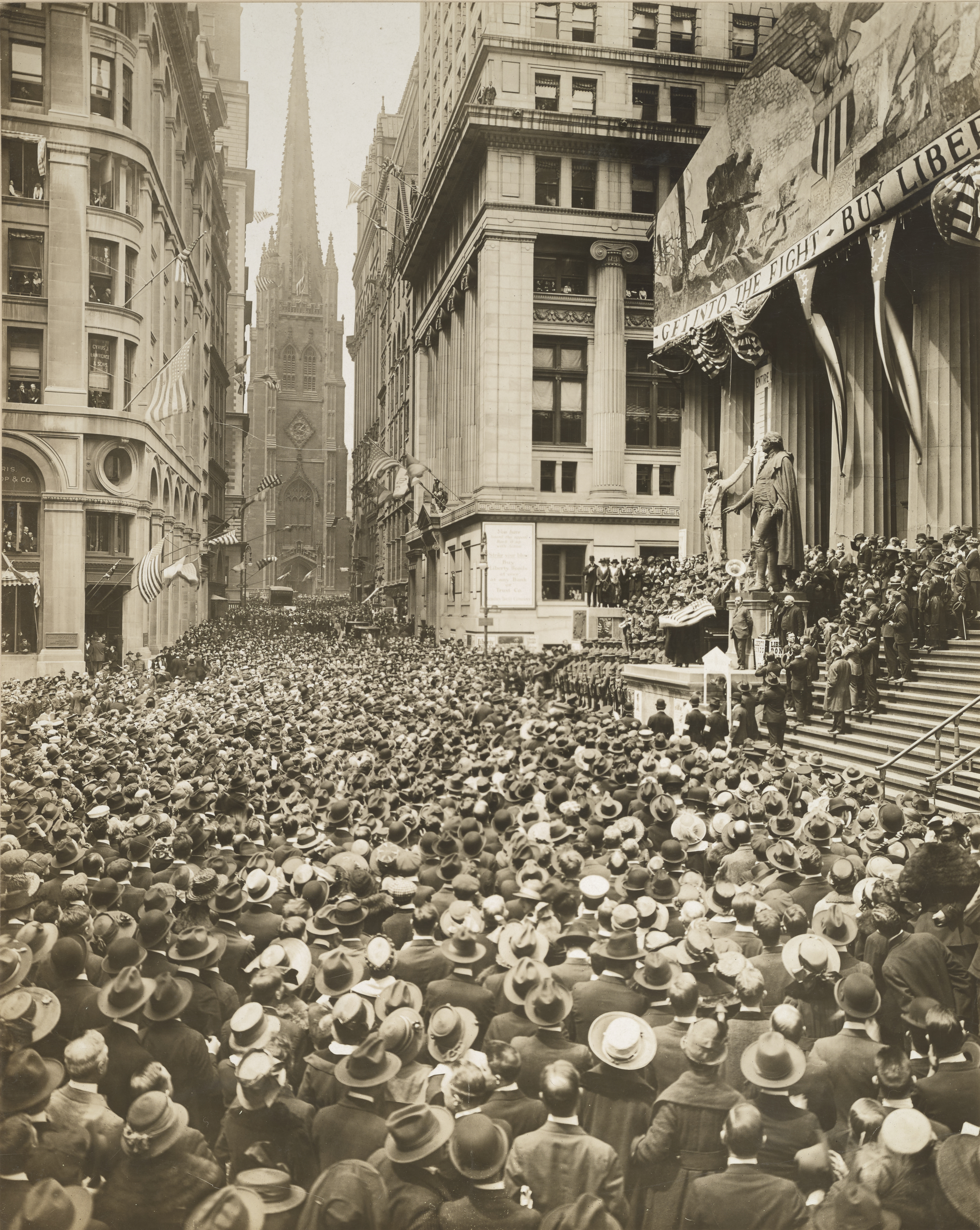
Schumann-Heink for the Third Liberty Loan Campaign, April 1918 in New York City

While living at North Caldwell, Schumann-Heink became interested in efforts to honor President Grover Cleveland. The future president was born in 1837 in nearby Caldwell, New Jersey, where his father, Rev. Richard Cleveland was minister of the First Presbyterian Church. On 10 September 1912, Schumann-Heink performed a benefit concert at the church to raise money to purchase the adjacent Presbyterian manse, Cleveland's birthplace. In 1913, the Grover Cleveland Birthplace Memorial Association (GCBMA) purchased the manse and opened it to the public as a museum.

During World War I, she supported the United States and its armed forces. She entertained the troops and raised money for Liberty Bonds, as well as "the Red Cross, knights of Columbus, Young Men's Christian Association, and Jewish War Relief, and to entertaining soldiers Throughout the United States" in order to help wounded veterans. She toured the United States raising money for the war effort, although she had relatives fighting on both sides of the war – including her sons August Heink, a merchant sailor who had been impressed into the German submarine service, Walter Schumann, Henry Heink and George Washington Schumann, all in the United States Navy.

== Later years ==
In 1926, she first sang "Stille Nacht" ("Silent Night") (in both German and English) over the radio for Christmas. This became a Christmas tradition with US radio listeners through Christmas of 1935. In 1927, she performed in an early Vitaphone sound short film, possibly the only surviving footage of her singing other than a brief performance she gave during the filming of a voice lesson she was giving to a group of aspiring young American mezzo-sopranos. She lost most of her assets in the Wall Street crash of 1929 and was forced to sing again at age 69.

Schumann-Heink: "Stille Nacht"

In 1926, then 65, she had begun a weekly radio program, in addition to announcing her plans to "teach forty American girls"; Schumann "spent considerable time advising women to forgo politics, smoking and unchaperoned dancing, and to devote themselves to bringing up children". In 1929, she taught tenor Arnold Blackner. Her last performance at the Metropolitan Opera was in 1932, performing Erda in Der Ring des Nibelungen, aged 71.

In January 1927, the American Tobacco Company (ATC) launched a print advertisement campaign for their Lucky Strikes brand featuring Schumann-Heink's photo and endorsement, the first campaign of its kind in the United States that featured a woman. The advertisement included the statement signed by Schumann-Heink "I recommend Lucky Strikes because they are kind to my throat." The copy also included ATC's statement "When smoking, she prefers Lucky Strikes because they give the greatest enjoyment and throat protection." Later that year, Schumann-Heink refuted the endorsement as fraudulent, and by the end of 1927 ATC reran the same campaign but with Nina Morgana's endorsement instead.

== Death and legacy ==
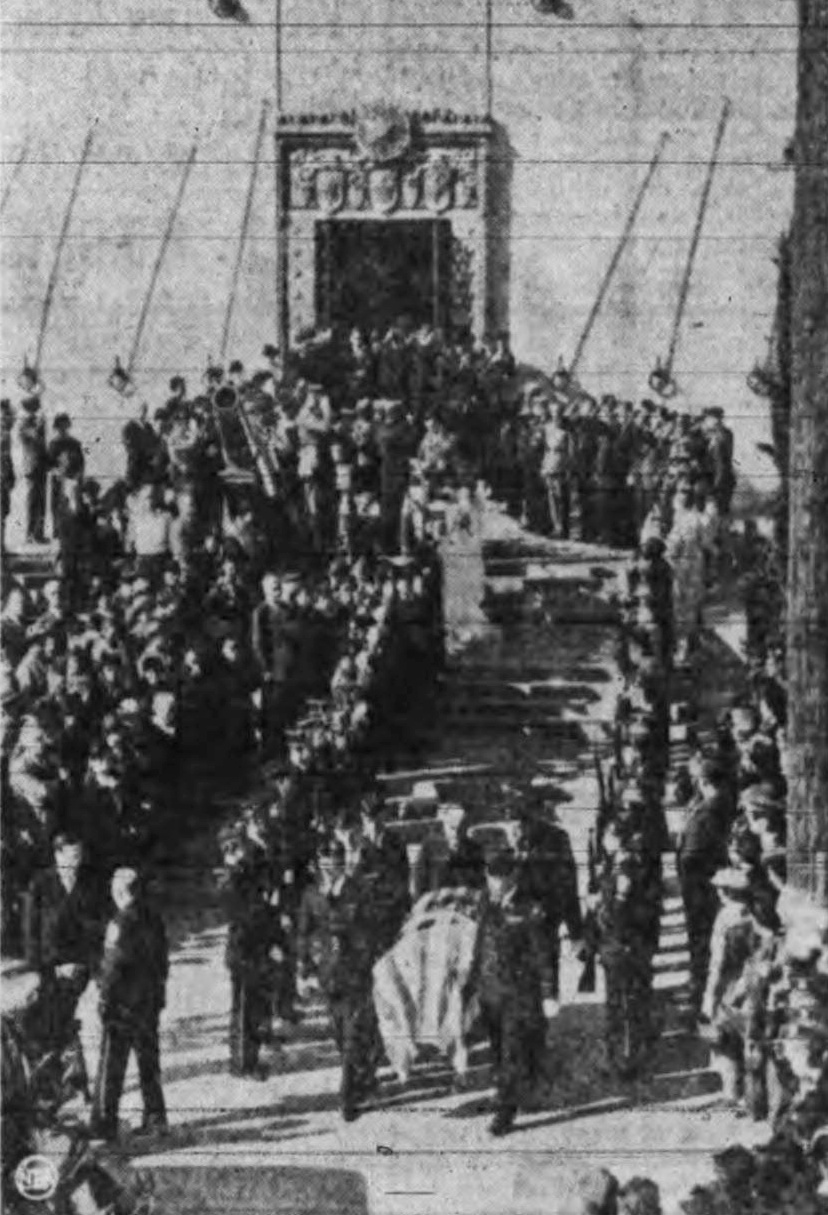
Veterans' farewell to Schumann-Heink, Hollywood, 20 November 1936

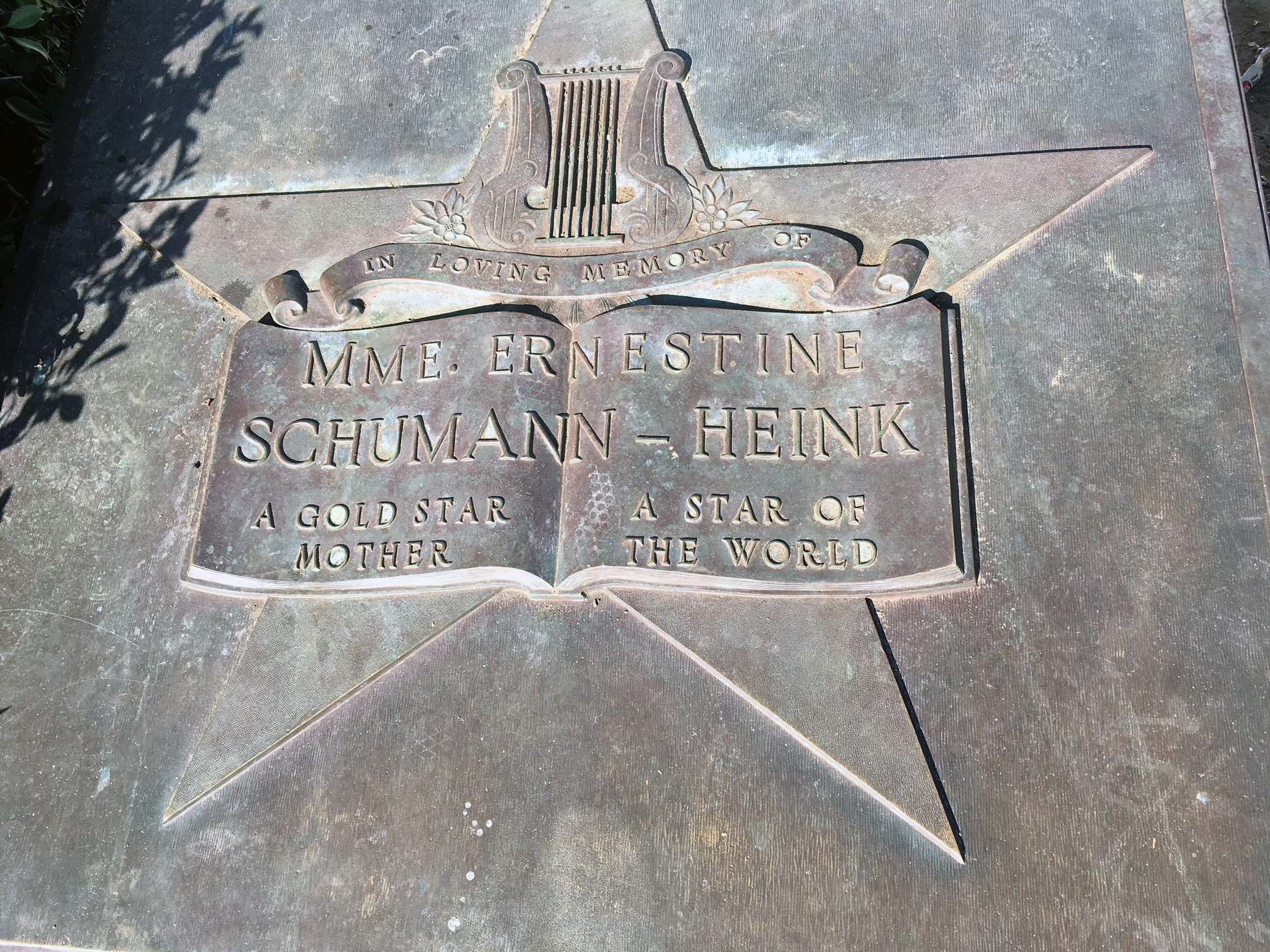
Memorial plaque, Balboa Park, San Diego

Schumann-Heink died of leukemia on 17 November 1936 in Hollywood, California, aged 75. Her funeral was conducted by the American Legion at the Hollywood Post Auditorium, and she was interred at Greenwood Memorial Park in San Diego. Her archive was donated to the Smithsonian Institution.

On Memorial Day, 30 May 1938, a bronze tablet honouring Schumann-Heink was unveiled by her granddaughter, Barbara Heink, at the Organ Pavilion in Balboa Park, San Diego. The tablet featured a star that reads:

In loving Memory of Mme. Ernestine Schumann-Heink. A Gold Star Mother. A Star of the World

== Operatic roles, with notable performances ==
Role	Opera	Composer	Stage	Year
Azucena	Il trovatore	Verdi	Dresden Opera, operatic debut	1878
Brangäne	Tristan und Isolde	Wagner		
Carmen	Carmen	Bizet	Hamburg Opera, first major role at the Hamburg opera	1886
Fidès	Le prophète	Meyerbeer	Hamburg Opera	1886
Ortrud	Lohengrin	Wagner		1886
Adriana	Rienzi	Wagner		
Amneris	Aida	Verdi		
Leonora	La favorita	Donizetti		
Katisha	The Mikado	Gilbert and Sullivan		
Marthe	Faust	Gounod		
Mary	Der fliegende Holländer	Wagner		
Witch	Hansel and Gretel	Humperdinck		
Erda	Siegfried	Wagner	Theatre Royal, Drury Lane, London, English debut	1892
Prince Orlofsky	Die Fledermaus	J. Strauss II		1894
Waltraute	Götterdämmerung	Wagner	Bayreuth, first performance at the Bayreuth Festival	1896
Ortrud	Lohengrin	Wagner	Chicago Opera, US debut	1898
Ortrud	Lohengrin	Wagner	New York, Metropolitan Opera debut	1899
Klytaemnestra	Elektra	R. Strauss	Dresden, world premiere	1909
Erda	Das Rheingold	Wagner	Metropolitan Opera, New York, final operatic performance	1932
