= Atalie Unkalunt =

Cherokee singer, activist, and designer

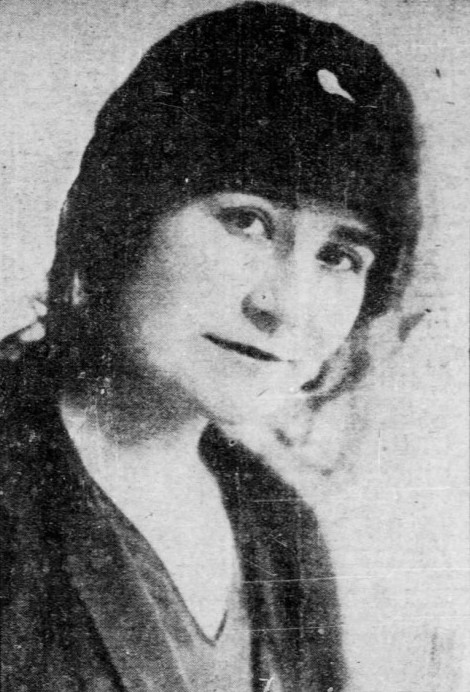
- Unkalunt, 1926
- Born: June 12, 1895; Stilwell, Cherokee Nation, Indian Territory
- Died: November 6, 1954 (aged 59); Washington, D.C.
- Other names: Atalie Rider, Iva J. Rider, Iva Josephine Rider, Josie Rider
- Citizenship: Cherokee Nation and US
- Occupations: Singer, activist, artist, interior designer, writer
- Years active: 1917–1951
- Father: Thomas LaFayette Rider

Atalie Unkalunt (June 12, 1895 – November 6, 1954) was a Cherokee singer, interior designer, activist, and writer. Her English name Iva J. Rider appears on the final rolls of the Cherokee Nation. Born in Indian Territory, she attended government-run Indian schools and then graduated from high school in Muskogee, Oklahoma. She furthered her education at the New England Conservatory of Music in Boston, Massachusetts. After a thirteen-month engagement with the YMCA as a stenographer and entertainer for World War I troops in France, she returned to the United States in 1919 and continued her music studies. By 1921, she was living in New York City and performing a mixture of operatic arias, contemporary songs, and Native music. Her attempts to become an opera performer were not successful. She was more accepted as a so-called "Indian princess", primarily singing the works of white composers involved in the Indianist movement.

Concerned with the preservation of Native American culture, Unkalunt founded the Society of the First Sons and Daughters of America in 1922. The organization allowed only tribally-affiliated Native Americans to join as full members and worked to promote Native culture and legislation which would be beneficial to Native communities. In conjunction with the society, she established a theater which featured productions written by and acted by Native people and an artists' workshop which assisted Native artists to develop and market their crafts. Among her many activities, she worked as an interior designer, wrote articles for newspapers and magazines, published a book, and researched traditional Native songs. In 1942, Unkalunt moved to Washington, D.C., and worked for the Office of the Coordinator of Inter-American Affairs. In the 1950s, she spent time researching Cherokee claims against the Indian Claims Commission.

== Early life and education ==
Atalie Unkalunt, which translates from Cherokee to Sunshine Rider in English, was known as Josie Rider to her white friends. She was born on June 12, 1895, on a farm near Stilwell, in the Going Snake District of the Cherokee Nation Indian Territory to Josephine (née Pace) and Thomas LaFayette Rider (Dom-Ges-Ke Un Ka Lunt). Thomas was a politician and served in the first, second, and fourth Oklahoma State House of Representatives for Adair County and in the seventh and eighth state legislatures as a Senator. Thomas and his children, Ola, Mary Angeline, Ruth Belle, Phoeba Montana, Mittie Earl, Roscoe Conklin, Milton Clark, Iva Josephine, Cherokee Augusta, and Anna Monetta Rider, are shown on the final Dawes Rolls for the Cherokee Nation, except the oldest and youngest, using their English names. He was the son of Mary Ann (née Bigby) and Charles Austin Augustus Rider, who walked the Trail of Tears, and maternal grandson of Margaret Catherine (née Adair) and Thomas Wilson Bigby. Josephine was a white woman, originally from Cherokee County, Georgia, whose family had fled Georgia during the American Civil War. She was known for her singing voice, which impacted Unkalunt's choice of career.

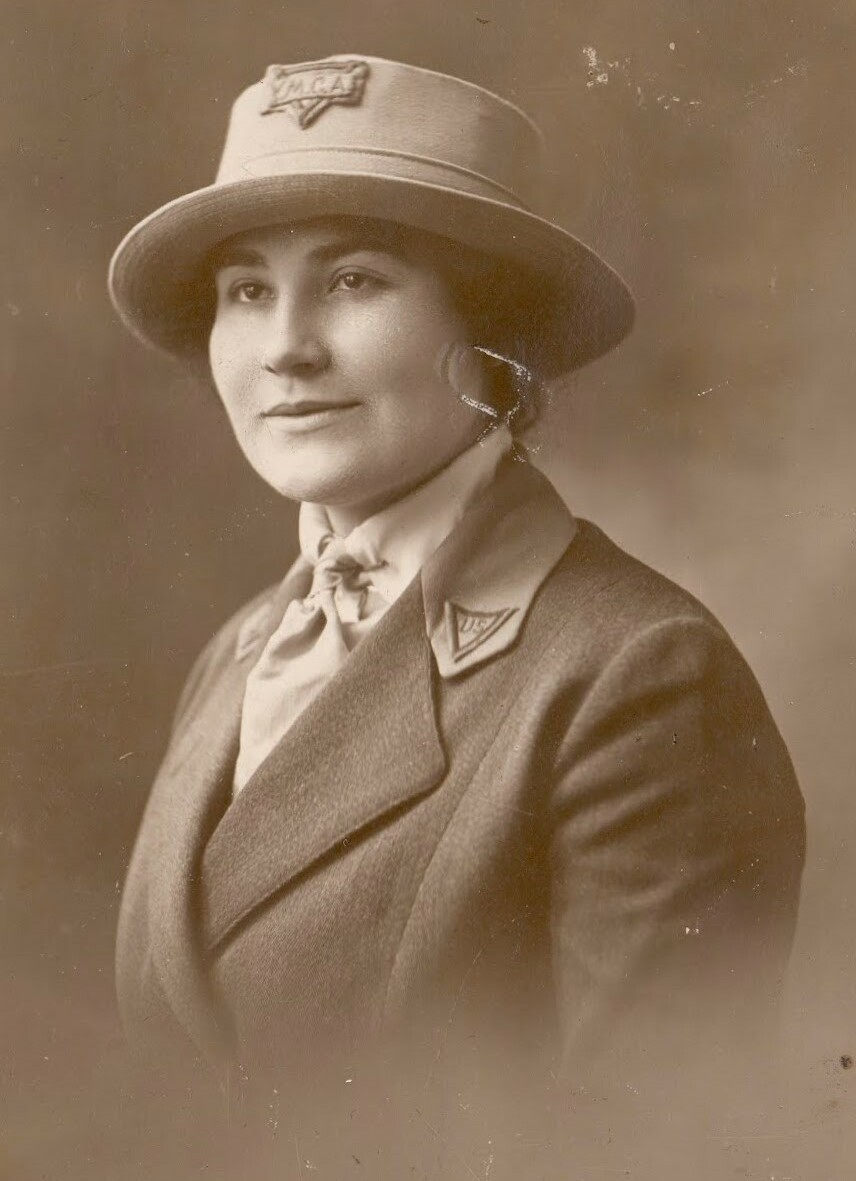
Unkalunt, circa 1918 in her YMCA uniform

Unkalunt attended government-run Indian schools, and graduated from Central High School, in Muskogee, Oklahoma. She then attended Thomas School for Girls in San Antonio, Texas, graduating in 1914. In 1915, she studied piano and voice in Muskogee with Mrs. Claude L. Steele before going to Chicago to take a course in music expression. After completing the course, she went to San Francisco and starred as the Indian female lead in a film, The Dying Race (1916), for the American Film Company. In late 1916, she enrolled at the New England Conservatory of Music in Boston, Massachusetts, studying under Millie Ryan, Clarence B. Shirley, and Charles White. She trained in literature under Dalla Lore Sharp, at Boston University, also studying ethics, logic, and psychology. At the same time, she attended the Emerson School of Oratory. She completed her studies in 1918, and went to New York to train with the YMCA for services in World War I. Stationed in France, Unkalunt worked as a secretary and entertainer for the troops for thirteen months and sent dispatches back for the local press. (Note: Ewen & Wolklock state she joined in 1917 and served for eighteen months abroad. However newspapers confirm she was abroad only thirteen months from October 1918 to November 1919. Callam noted that because she could not pay her own expenses as entertainers were expected to do, Unkalunt was officially a stenographer for the business unit of the YMCA and had to falsify her birth date to meet the 25-year-age requirement for service.)

== Career ==
=== Classical music pursuits (1921–1924) ===
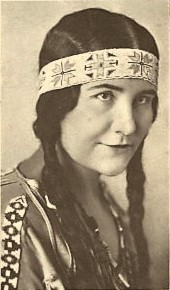
Unkalunt in a performing costume, 1924

Returning stateside, Unkalunt moved to New York City in 1921, and began training with Millie Ryan. She performed at private functions, sang on the radio, and toured throughout the country as a soprano, performing three seasons as a soloist with the Boston Symphony Orchestra at Lake Placid, New York and with Victor Herbert's orchestra. Her repertoire included arias from operas, such as Carmen, Madama Butterfly, and Natoma, popular music like "Dear Eyes" by Frank H. Grey and "Thy Voice Is Like a Silver Flute" by J. H. Larway, as well as Native songs performed in costume and accompanied by a hand drum. She was billed as a prima donna, an "Indian princess", and one of the foremost Native American sopranos in the country. A promotional pamphlet from 1924 stated that her voice "carried the perfume of roses on the wings of song". A reviewer for the Brooklyn Daily Eagle said she "sang in a clear, rich voice, sympathetic and well sustained".

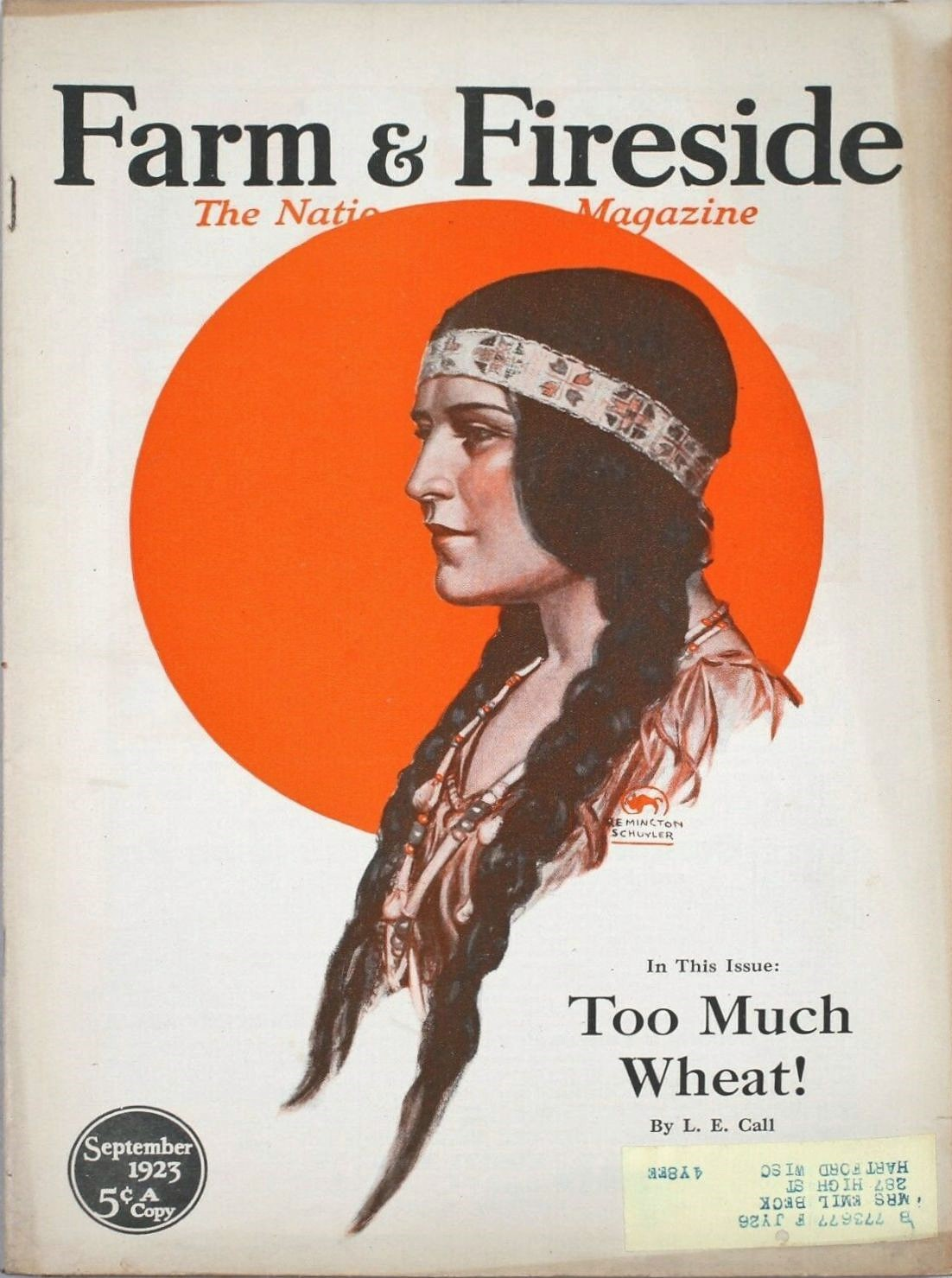
Unkalunt on the cover of Farm & Fireside, September 1923

Beginning in March 1922, and continuing until late 1923, newspaper articles reported that Unkalunt was to create the role of Nitana, in the opera of the same name, composed by Umberto Vesci, an Italian immigrant to the United States. The libretto was written by Augustus Post and copyrighted in 1916. According to Katie A. Callam, the first academic to write about Unkalunt's life, the stereotypical story depicted an undistinguished but exotic Native village, that was the home of "a noble Native warrior and an innocent Indian maiden", who became caught between the warrior and the "swaggering and paternalistic white colonizing hero". After spending time in the white settlement, Nitana returned to her people in time to stop the warrior Waguntah from killing the colonist Barton and accepted the fate that the white settlers would cause the eventual demise of Native people. The wide press coverage provided her career with substantial publicity and resulted in her portrait being painted by Remington Schuyler, and featured on the September 1923 cover of the national magazine Farm & Fireside.

For unknown reasons, the opera was not realized. When Nitana fell through, Unkalunt began to write her own libretto for a Native American opera for which Herbert agreed to compose music, but the work was unfinished at his 1924 death. After that project also failed, Unkalunt recognized that there was little chance of her singing opera in the United States. Her performances were subsequently composed of Native and Indianist music, rather than opera.

With Unkalunt's desire for Native American music to be preserved and brought to a wider audience, she had to work within the confines of public expectation and stereotypes, limiting her freedom of expression and sometimes "playing Indian" to draw in white audiences. (Note: Playing Indian is a term which defines racist entertainment depicting people of Native American descent in stereotypical ways. It is similar to minstrelsy, which made caricatures of African Americans. It can describe white people who have misappropriated Native culture and symbolism, as is described in Philip J. Deloria's Playing Indian. It can also describe actual Native performers, who were forced to modify their performances to be acceptable to white audiences. For example, Native women were expected to perform as princesses in buckskin dresses and be adorned with beaded accessories, while males were portrayed as chiefs wearing feathered headdresses and fringed buckskins and often spoke in broken English or were stoically silent.) Native cultures were seen to be dying at the time (as in the title of Unkalunt's 1916 film) and the tendency was for white composers to apply Western harmonic systems to Native melodies in an attempt to preserve the music. To be able to make a living as a performer, Unkalunt's best path as an indigenous woman was to perform these types of Indianist compositions.

=== Ainslie scandal (1924–1928) ===
At the end of 1924, Unkalunt became embroiled in a lawsuit with Lucie Benedict, the daughter of the well-to-do art dealer, George H. Ainslie. Benedict alleged that Unkalunt had stolen from her father some silk material, furnishings, and clothing, originally valued at $355 but reported in court to be worn and threadbare items worth about $10. Newspapers reported that Ainslie and his wife had met the singer during a meeting of the Greenwich Village Historical Society, held in his gallery to promote Native American art. After his wife died, Ainslie befriended Unkalunt and arranged for artist friends to paint her portrait and complete a sculpture of her. When his attention became romantic, although Unkalunt refused his advances, Benedict sought to terminate her father's infatuation by accusing the singer of theft. Unkalunt testified that Ainslie was upset by her rejection and in order to hurt her backed his daughter's claims.

Unkalunt was acquitted in November 1924, after Benedict admitted to planting some of the stolen items in her rooms. Unkalunt then counter-sued Ainslie for defamation, the expenses incurred in her defense, and the loss of wages, as forty of her scheduled concerts had canceled because of the accusations. She had testified at her trial that she was earning a living working as a secretary for the Tidewater Oil Company, as an assistant to a real estate agent, from writing, and from a benefactor. In 1925, Ainsley won a change of venue in the case from Westchester County to Manhattan, which prompted Unkalunt to appeal the change. The case had still not been heard in 1928, when Unkalunt filed bankruptcy declaring an unliquidated claim of $250,000 from the pending lawsuit as the majority of her available assets.

=== Cultural preservation and activism (1921–1942) ===
Simultaneously with her arrival in New York City, Unkalunt began working for the New York City Board of Education. She presented songs and Native legends to over three hundred and fifty public schools between 1921 and 1923. She also lectured for the United States Department of the Interior, giving presentations on Native culture. In 1922, she founded an organization known as the Society of the First Sons and Daughters of America. The society allowed only persons who were authentically Native Americans to be full members. It accepted associate members who were allies and its purpose was to foster an appreciation for cultural expression and to influence lawmaking which would be of benefit to "Amerinds", a phrase Unkalunt coined to call American Indians. She believed that her mixed-race status allowed her to be a bridge between two cultures, saying, "I have the strength and stoicism of the Indian, but the drive of the whites...and therefore [am] able to fight for what I want".

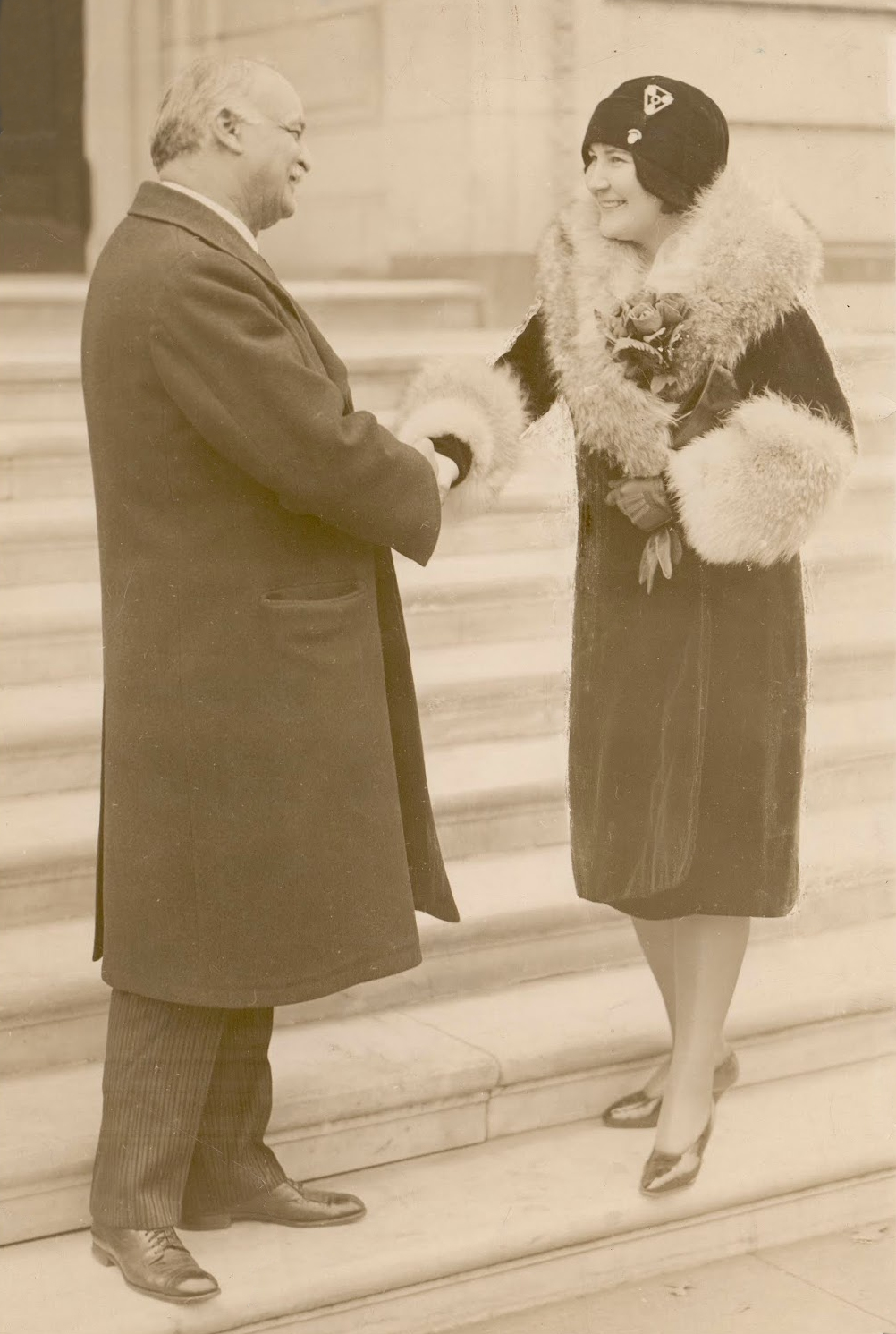
Charles Curtis and Unkalunt in 1929

Callam describes Unkalunt as a "one-woman force promoting Native rights, particularly related to the arts". She published articles in newspapers across the country promoting Native women, and fighting against government restrictions of practicing Native religions and dance rituals. For eight years in the 1930s she operated the Indian Council Lodge in a theater on West 58th Street. The council was a private theater troupe, which included actors such as Chief Yowlachie and presented programs both written and performed by Native people. The theater group was operated in conjunction with the First Sons and Daughters of America, which had a membership of nearly three thousand in 1933.

Unkalunt gave lectures and sang performances to women's clubs and community organizations throughout the United States. She participated in the Wisconsin Dells Indian Pageant from 1924 to 1936 and various inter-racial music festivals. She also organized Indian Day celebrations and Native dances. She broadcast musical recitals and educational programs about Native cultures via shortwave radio to Australia, France, Germany, Great Britain, Italy, South Africa, and several locations in South America, as well as on WJZ in Newark, New Jersey and WRC in Washington, D.C.

In 1929, Unkalunt and other Native performers were invited to sing at the White House for the inauguration of President Herbert Hoover and his vice president Charles Curtis, a member of the Kaw Nation. She performed again at the White House in 1934. In her performances, Unkalunt strove to present both Indianist materials and more authentic native melodies. Among songs she sang were popular works by Charles Wakefield Cadman, like "From the Land of the Sky-Blue Water" and "Her Shadow"; by Thurlow Lieurance, such as "By the Weeping Waters", "Love Song", "Lullaby", "O'er an Indian Cradle", and "Rainbow Land", among others; and by Carlos Troyer, including "A Lover's Wooing" and "Invocation to the Sun God", as well as tunes by other composers. Because these works were often significantly altered to suit modern tastes, Unkalunt researched more traditional works at repositories like the Smithsonian Institution and added them to her repertoire. She rarely performed Cherokee songs, which Callam speculated might have been a tactic to protect her culture.

=== Interior designer, painter, and author (1928–1942) ===
In the late 1920s, Unkalunt began to make her living from interior design and by 1931, it was her primary means of making a living. She began to explore fabric art in 1927 and a series of her designs was exhibited at the New York City Art Alliance gallery. A manufacturing company produced several silk designs and a carpet manufacturer used some of her designs to weave floor coverings, expanding her interests into interior design. Unkalunt turned the second-story above her garage into a workshop to allow Native artists to make textiles, carpets, furniture and other handicrafts. She exhibited some of her artwork at Douthitt Gallery operated by John F. Douthitt and the Rehn Gallery owned by Frank Knox Morton Rehn Jr., both in New York City.

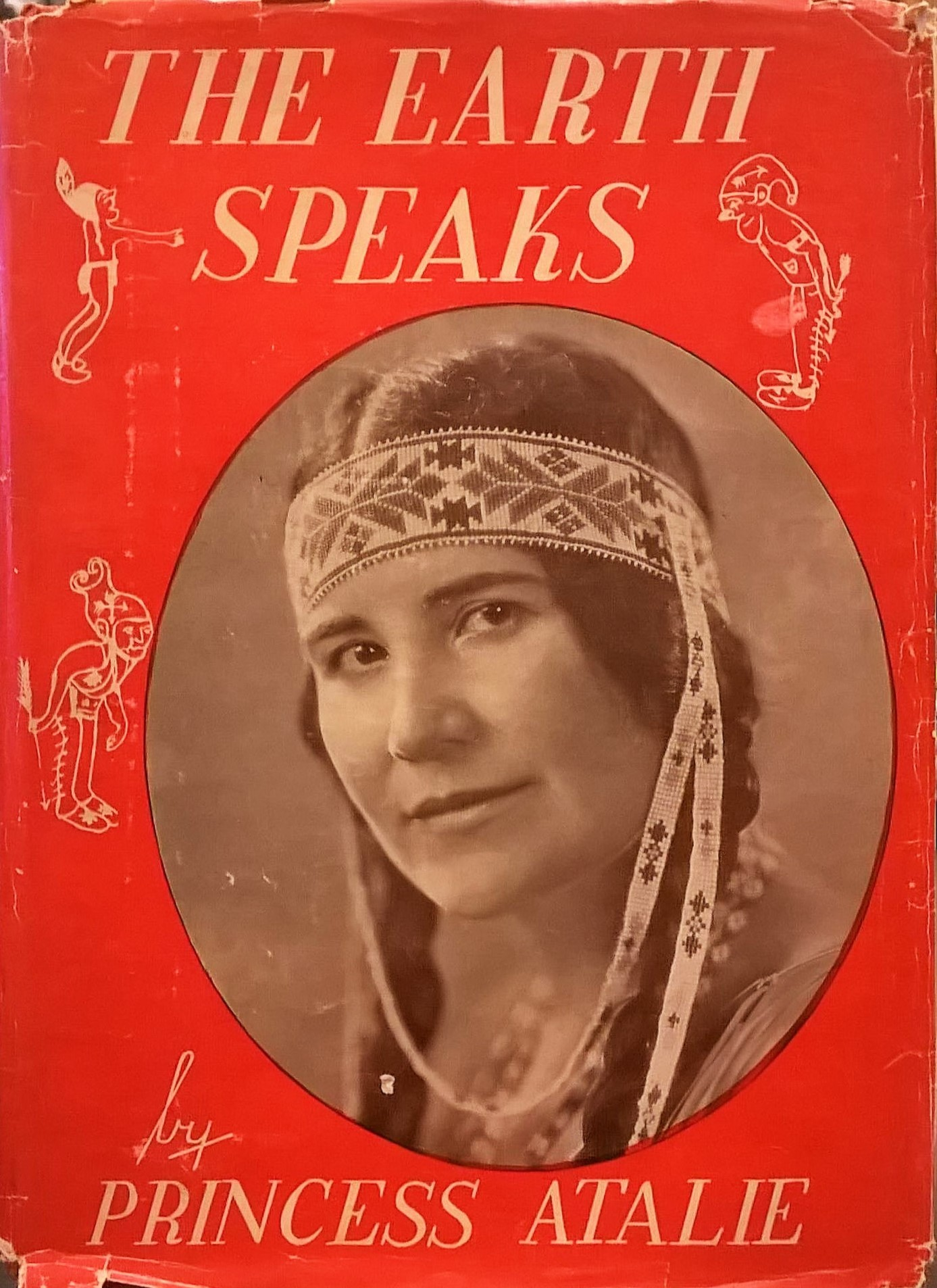
The Earth Speaks cover, 1940

In 1928, Unkalunt designed the offices of WMCA radio station, which occupied the entire tenth floor of the Hammerstein Theatre Building. The walls featured murals like "Spirit of the Wind" and "The Storm Clouds", works representing flight to symbolize radio's broadcasting over air. Mirrors and furnishings also used symbols drawn from Native culture. She was hired by Vice President Curtis in 1929 to decorate his private study in his suite at the Mayflower Hotel, that served as his official residence in Washington. In 1931, she redecorated the home of Rosamund Vanderbilt, following Aztecan tribal motifs.

Unkalunt published a collection of poetry and legends in The Earth Speaks, released in 1939. A review in The Tennessean described that the book conveyed legends regarding the origin of the world, and various aspects of nature. She related the voices of the earth, including the wild roar of water in a river gorge, the songs of birds and buzz of insects, and music in summer breezes and falling rain. William S. Gailmor, reviewing the work for the Brooklyn Daily Eagle, said the book combined reality and myth to portray the magic of nature and the ability of plants, flowers, and herbs to provide both beauty and medicine. He stated that her "feeling for the earth was lyrical". Historian Grant Foreman noted in his review that she had presented legends in poetic form and illustrated them with her own drawings.

=== Later life (1942–1954) ===
In 1942, Unkalunt moved to Washington, D.C., at the request of Nelson Rockefeller to take up a post in the science and education department of the Office of the Coordinator of Inter-American Affairs. She continued to produce content for newspapers and magazines, sang at women's and community group gatherings, and participated in programs sponsored by the State Department for Voice of America. In the early 1950s, she became interested in the work of the Indian Claims Commission and began researching in government archives to advance the work of attorneys working on Cherokee claims for breaches in treaty provisions. Her organization, the First Sons and Daughters of America, continued to work on Native issues, and in 1951 had a membership of 2,400.

== Death and legacy ==
Unkalunt died on November 6, 1954, at her home at 1410 M Street NW, Washington, D.C., after a heart attack. She was buried three days later at Cedar Hill Cemetery, in nearby Suitland, Maryland. At the time of her death, she was remembered as an authority on Native American folklore. In 1957, Umkalunt's nephew, Major T. L. Rider, donated a collection of her stage costumes and artifacts to the Indian Museum in Ponca City, Oklahoma. Among those items were her sand-painted piano, buckskin costumes, and beaded accessories. Seventy-five images of Unkalunt, which had been donated to the C.H. Nash Museum at Chucalissa by Mrs. Dale Hall, were given by Chucalissa to the Museum of the American Indian, Heye Foundation in 1978. The Heye collections were merged into the holdings of the Smithsonian Institution in 1990 and became part of the National Museum of the American Indian, which had been founded in 1989. Despite her prominence in life and her connection with other noted Native performers and leaders, Unkalunt's history was not studied by academics until the 21st century.

== Works ==
- John R. Freuler (producer) (1916). The Dying Race (Motion picture). San Francisco, California: American Film Company.
- [Unkalunt], Princess Atalie (May 22, 1929). Land of the Sky Blue Water (10-inch recording). Camden, New Jersey: Victor Talking Machine Company. BVE-Test-644.
- [Unkalunt], Princess Atalie (May 22, 1929). Navajo Drinking Song (10-inch recording). Camden, New Jersey: Victor Talking Machine Company. BVE-Test-645.
- [Unkalunt], Princess Atalie (1939). The Earth Speaks. New York, New York: Fleming H. Revell Company. OCLC 34883152.
- [Unkalunt], Princess Atalie (1950). Talking Leaves. New York, New York: unpublished manuscript.
- Unkalunt, Atalie (1954). "Forward". In Hirsh, Alice (ed.). From Pipes Long Cold. Boston, Massachusetts: Bruce Humphries, Inc. OCLC 13242675.
