= Harry Barnhart =

Harry Barnhart may refer to:

- Harry Horner Barnhart (1874–1948), American conductor and musician
- Harry J. Barnhart (1890–1961), American football and basketball coach
