= Frank Porter =

Frank Porter may refer to:

- Frank Porter (cricketer), South African cricketer
- Frank Addison Porter, American pianist and composer
- Frank B. Porter, pioneer businessman and real estate developer of Monterey Peninsula
