= Tchaikovsky Piano Concerto No. 2 =

Tchaikovsky Piano Concerto No. 2 may refer to

- Piano Concerto No. 2 (Tchaikovsky), the second of piano concertos of Pyotr Ilyich Tchaikovsky
- Tschaikovsky Piano Concerto No. 2 (ballet), a 1941 ballet by George Balanchine, to the above music.
