= Edgar Stillman Kelley =

American composer, conductor, teacher, and writer on music

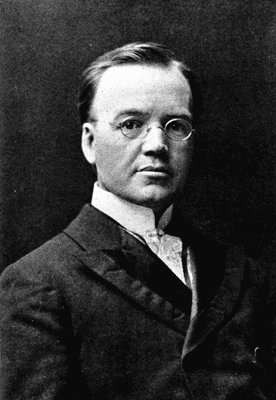
Kelley circa 1900-1910

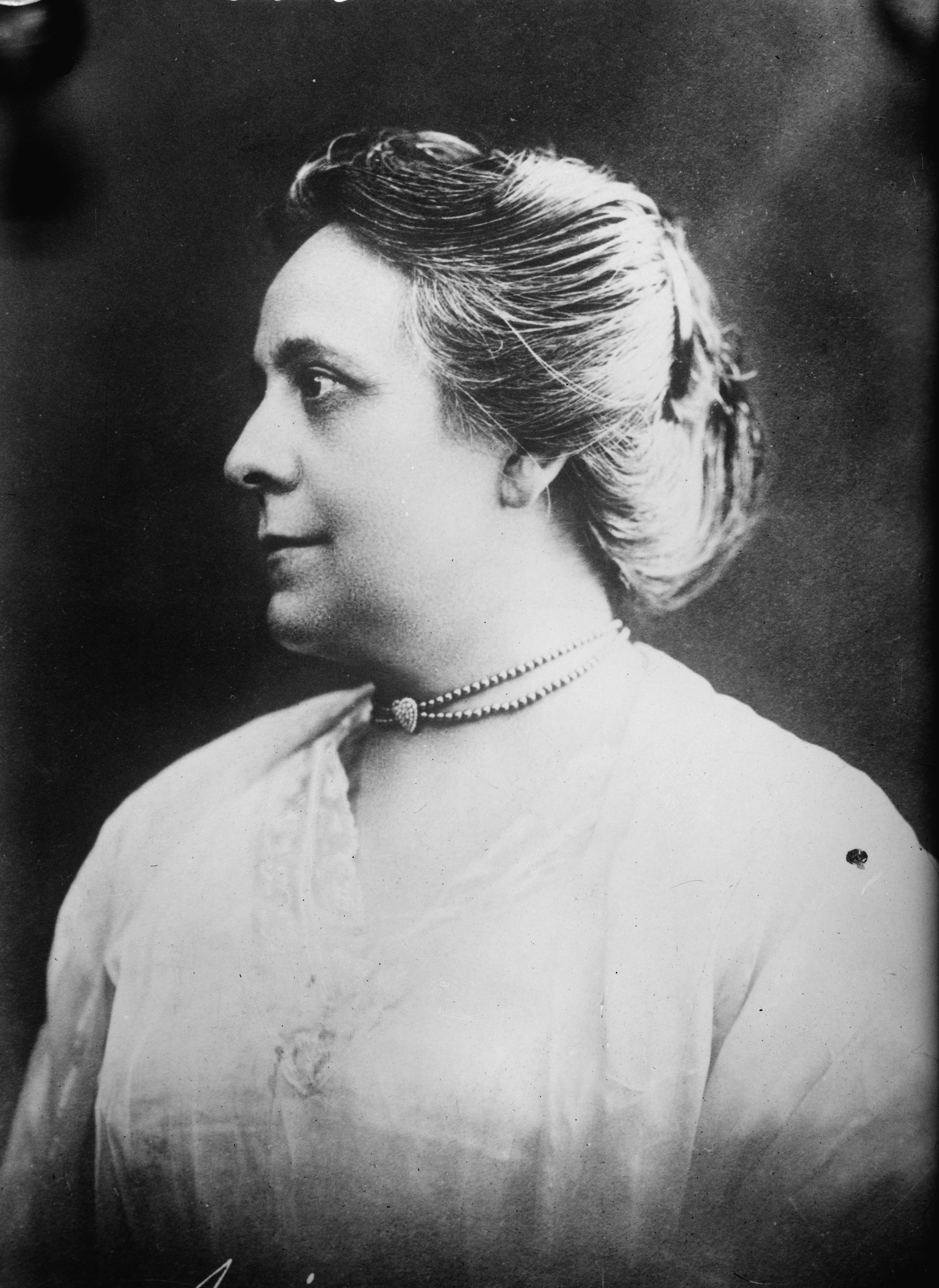
He married Jessie Gregg

Edgar Stillman Kelley (April 14, 1857 – November 12, 1944) was an American composer, conductor, teacher, and writer on music. He is sometimes associated with the Indianist movement in American music.

== Life ==
Kelley was of New England stock, his ancestors having come to America from England before 1650. He himself was born in Sparta, Wisconsin. His mother was from a musical family, and herself was skilled in music; she became his first teacher. Kelley's own college career was interrupted by bouts of poor health. He was a talented artist and writer, but he decided to devote his life to music after a performance of Felix Mendelssohn's music for A Midsummer Night's Dream. Consequently, he traveled to Chicago at 17, there to study with Clarence Eddy and Napoleon Ledochowski. Two years later he went to Stuttgart, where he studied organ, piano, and composition. His teachers there were Frederich Finck, Wilhelm Krüger, Wilhelm Speidel, and Max Seifriz. His friendship with Edward MacDowell began in Stuttgart, and later Kelley worked at the MacDowell Colony.

Kelley graduated from the conservatory in Stuttgart in 1880, and performed around Europe for a time with a number of orchestras. Upon his return to the United States, he came west to San Francisco, where he worked as a church organist and was a music critic for the Examiner. He also became active as a composer, writing incidental music for a production of Macbeth that garnered him much attention. An interest in theater drew him to New York City in 1886, and there he married Jessie Gregg on July 23, 1891; the two then returned to California for four more years, during which time Kelley composed, conducted, lectured, and taught. In 1896 the couple returned to New York, where Edgar was hired to conduct an operetta company. He also taught, at the New York College of Music and New York University, and in 1901 replaced Horatio Parker for a year at Yale when the latter went on sabbatical. The following year saw the Kelleys move to Berlin, and for eight years they lived and worked in Europe, lecturing, teaching, conducting, and performing in an attempt to expand European interest in American music. Kelley, though, wished to spend more time composing, and in 1910 took a post at the Western College for Women in Oxford, Ohio, where he remained until his death. While at Western, Kelley became a faculty-level member in Miami University's chapter of Phi Mu Alpha Sinfonia.

Kelley and his wife divided their time between the Western College and the Cincinnati Conservatory of Music; Kelley taught composition there, and later served as dean of the Department of Composition and Orchestration. Among his pupils was C. Hugo Grimm, who would himself later lead the department. His wife lectured there as well. The couple retired in 1934 but continued to travel while maintaining a house in Oxford. Kelley died in Oxford in 1944, and was buried in the Oxford Cemetery.

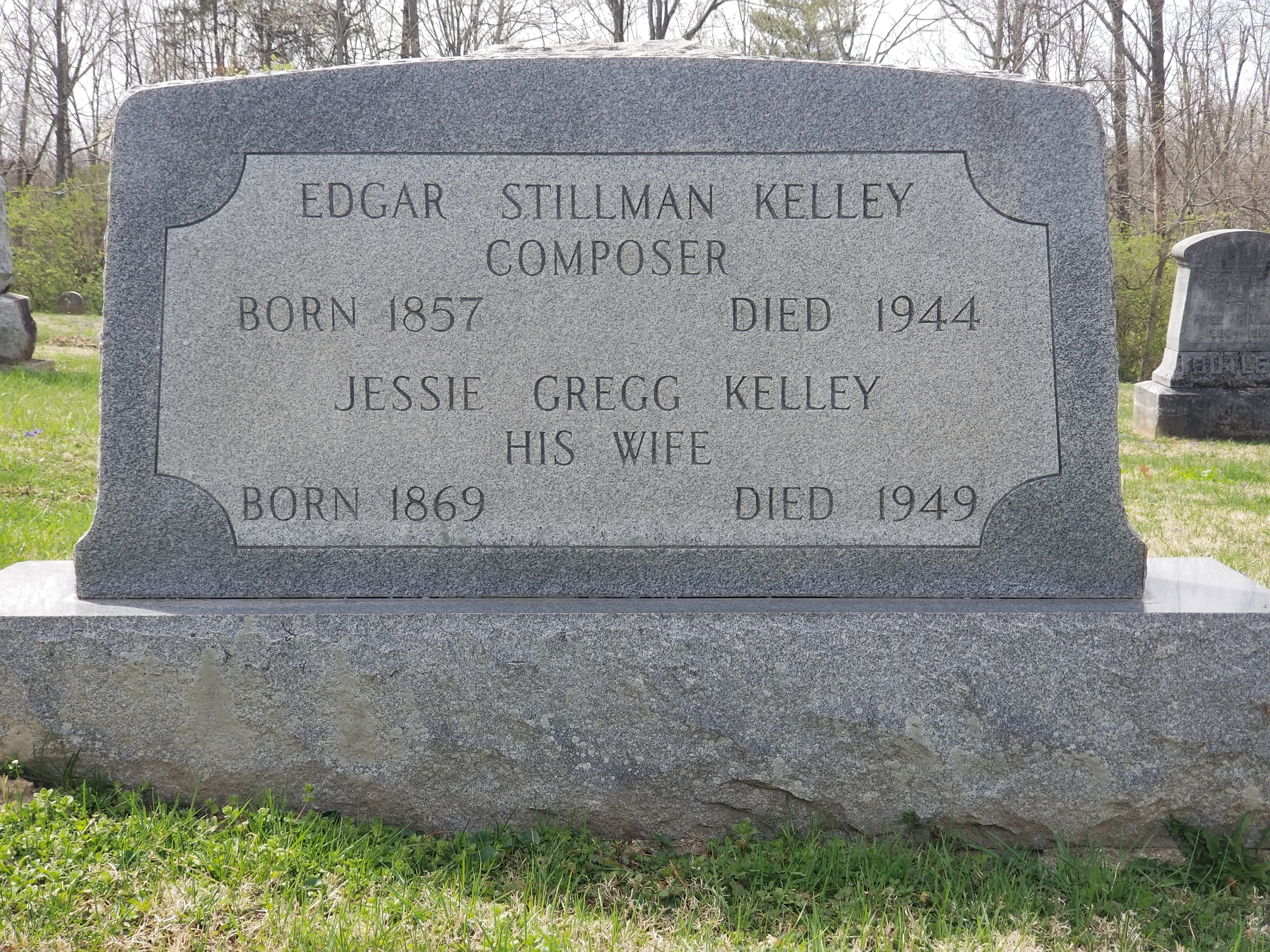
The Kelley's grave in Oxford Cemetery.

== Music ==
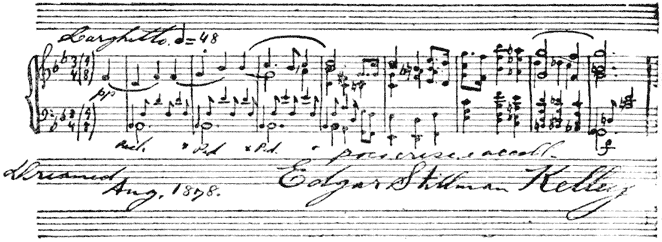
Autograph fragment of music by Edgar Stillman Kelley

Kelley was a Romanticist in the vein of Horatio Parker, George Whitefield Chadwick, and Arthur Foote, and brought much of his German training to bear in his compositions. Even so, he was always interested in bringing non-Western influences into his work. For his orchestral suite Aladdin, one of his early successes, he studied the music he heard in San Francisco's Chinatown, and used oboes, muted trumpets, and mandolins to imitate Chinese instruments. His New England Symphony is based on themes found in bird songs (the andante portion), as well as American Indian and Puritan music. For incidental music to a New York production of Ben-Hur in 1899, he based his composition on Greek modes. This music was to go on to become his most popular work; it is said to have been performed some five thousand times in English-speaking countries by 1930.

Kelley's best-known composition was an oratorio, The Pilgrim's Progress, composed on a text by Elizabeth Hodgkinson and based on the eponymous text by John Bunyan. It was first performed in Cincinnati in 1918, and was frequently revived thereafter, both in the United States and in England. He also wrote program music, including orchestral suites after both "The Pit and the Pendulum" and Alice in Wonderland; his first symphony was based on Gulliver's Travels, and depicted Lemuel Gulliver's adventures in Lilliput. His output also included numerous pieces of chamber music.

Kelley had very definite ideas about American music and its creation, and was not shy about sharing them. Expressing his views, he once wrote that

the American composer should apply the universal principles of his art to the local and special elements of the subject-matter as they appeal to him, and then, consciously or unconsciously, manifest his individuality, which will involve the expression of mental traits and moral tendencies peculiar to his European ancestry, as we find them modified by the new American environment.

A good deal of Kelley's music was published by Arthur Farwell's Wa-Wan Press in the early years of the twentieth century.

== Other work ==
In addition to his work as a composer, Kelley was active as a writer on music, continuing after his early experience with the Examiner in San Francisco. Included in his output were a number of books, including Chopin the Composer and a work on Beethoven. His important article "The Bach-Schumann Suites for Cello" appears in Music: A Monthly Magazine for November 1892, 612-19; he owned a unique copy of the six suites (now lost?). The most notable of his composition pupils was Wallingford Riegger; among his other students were Frederick Ayres, Joseph W. Clokey, James G. Heller, Theodore Holland, Rupert Hughes, W. Otto Miessner, Alexander Russell, and Ella May Dunning Smith.

Miami University maintains an archive devoted to Kelley and his wife; it contains correspondence, music manuscripts, books, and other material related to the composer's life and career. In addition, his house and studio, built in 1916, remains on the Miami University campus, and is made available for the use of incoming faculty and administration.

== Recordings ==
Little of Kelley's music has been committed to disc. The Aladdin fantasy for orchestra has been recorded as part of an anthology of American orchestral music, and pianist Brian Kovach has recorded his complete output of piano music; both recordings were released by Albany Records.

Leopold Stokowski and the Philadelphia Orchestra recorded The Red Queen's Banquet from Kelley's 'Alice in Wonderland' Suite on an acoustic 78 rpm disc in 1924. It was unissued at the time but has finally been released on a CD along with other Stokowski acoustic 78s by 'Pristine Audio' (PASC 471).

== Legacy ==
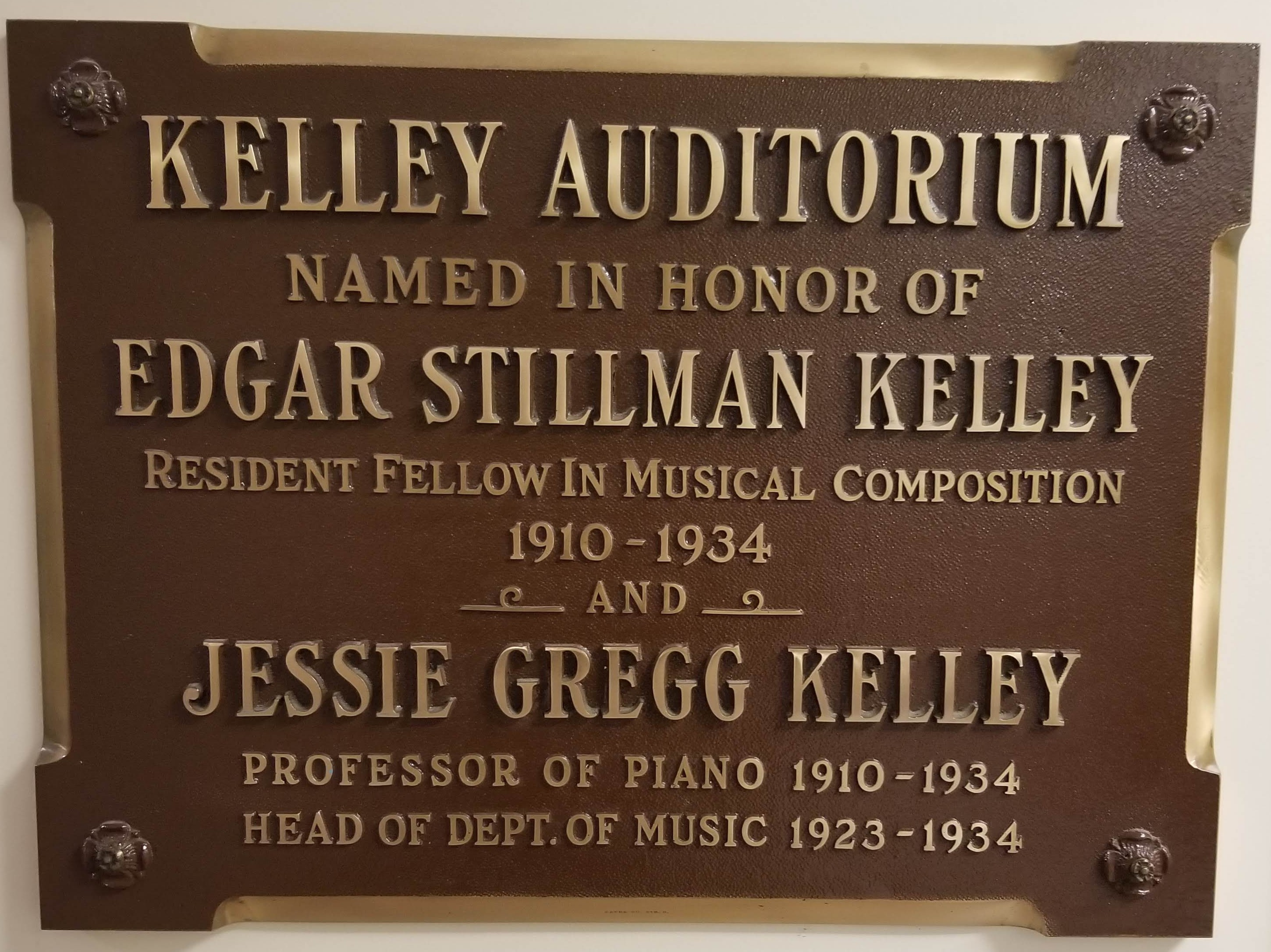
Plaque in the lobby of current day Presser Hall marking Kelley's namesake of the former auditorium.

The former auditorium in Presser Hall at Western College for Women was named in honor of Kelley and his wife.
