= Indianist movement =

Movement in American classical music (1880s-1920s)

The Indianist movement was a movement in American classical music that flourished from the 1880s through the 1920s. It was based on attempts by classical composers to incorporate American Indian musical ideas with some of the basic principles of Western music, with the goal of creating a new, truly American national music.

Chief practitioners of the form included Charles Sanford Skilton, Arthur Nevin, Arthur Farwell, and Charles Wakefield Cadman. Many other composers also incorporated Native American music in their works at various points in their careers. In his book Imagining Native America in Music Michael Pisani argues that there was no such thing as an "Indianist" movement in American music, but that American composers' borrowing melodies of native America (beginning around 1890) was simply one part of a larger interest in the use of folk musics of all ethnicities on American soil. (A similar interest was expressed in the work of several classical composers of Central and South America, as well as in Europe at this time).

== Origins ==
The Indianist movement could trace its roots to certain trends in nineteenth-century American Romanticism, which was engaging with folk music of many forms. Examples of music on "Indian" themes can be found dating back to the early years of the seventeenth century. Stories relating to the conquest of the Americas were popular with composers through the late eighteenth century as well. The composers' work can be seen as part of the interest in Native Americans at a time when it was felt they were disappearing. Writers such as James Fenimore Cooper and Henry Wadsworth Longfellow wrote about the "noble savage". Edwin Forrest, too, influenced the movement with his star performance in the play Metamora. At least one composer, Anthony Philip Heinrich, a contemporary of these artists, is recorded as having spent some time among the Indians on the American frontiers; he was the first to set Longfellow's Hiawatha to music. He did not, however, use Indian musical themes in his work.

== Beginnings of the movement ==
With the rise in studies both in ethnology and in folklore in the late nineteenth century, much information was gleaned and collected about various American Indian cultures. In 1880 Theodore Baker transcribed songs from a number of tribes, publishing them two years later in a German-language dissertation for his doctorate from the University of Leipzig. Edward MacDowell borrowed themes from Baker's work when composing his Second (Indian) Suite for orchestra in 1894.

In 1892, Czech composer Antonín Dvořák arrived to teach in New York City. He exhorted American composers to stop imitating European models, and to turn instead, as he had, to indigenous sources. Composer Frederick Burton took the idea to heart, and transcribed some Ojibway melodies. He later adapted these as art songs.

Later work by ethnographers and musicologists helped to build a body of notated music by Indians, and this aided some composers in searching for musical sources. Carlos Troyer notated their source material themselves in an attempt to be as authentic as possible. Others, such as Harvey Worthington Loomis, borrowed from already-published sources. Charles Sanford Skilton was probably the composer who did most to establish the stereotypes of the genre, with pieces such as his Suite Primeval for orchestra.

Opera composers also attempted to incorporate Indian themes in their work; among Indianist operas were Poia, by Arthur Nevin; Victor Herbert's Natoma; Charles Skilton's Kalopin and The Sun Bride; Alberto Bimboni's Winona; and Francesco Bartolomeo de Leone's Alglala. Charles Wakefield Cadman's Shanewis (or The Robin Woman, 1918) was produced in two succeeding seasons by the Metropolitan Opera of New York and was very popular. It also toured, being produced after World War I in Denver in 1924 and Los Angeles in 1926. DeLeone, Bimboni and Skilton were awarded the Bispham Memorial Medal Award for their operas.

== Arthur Farwell ==
Arthur Farwell was perhaps the most important composer involved in the Indianist movement at the height of its influence. He professed interest in all forms of American music, "notably, ragtime, Negro songs, Indian songs, Cowboy songs, and, of the utmost importance, new and daring expressions of our own composers, sound-speech previously unheard." He seemed to show particular interest in American Indian music. Farwell founded the Wa-Wan Press, which published songs and other compositions of Indianist music in America. As a composer, Farwell did not regard American Indian music as a novelty, but as a profound source of inspiration for his work.

== Decline ==
The Wa-Wan Press began losing subscribers around 1908, and folded in 1912 after being acquired by G. Schirmer. The growing influence of jazz and popular music, and a lack of American interest in Romanticism, combined to end the formal Indianist movement in music. But Native American subjects have continued to interest composers, both in the United States and abroad. Since the late 20th century, new works on Native American themes are being created by Native American composers.

== Indianist composers ==
Among the major Indianist composers were:

- Charles Wakefield Cadman
- Arthur Farwell
- Arthur Nevin
- Charles Sanford Skilton
- Edgar Stillman Kelley
- Harvey Worthington Loomis
- Carlos Troyer
- Carl Busch
- Preston Ware Orem
- Thurlow Lieurance

Composers who wrote works based on Indian themes, and who are sometimes grouped under the "Indianist" label, include:

- Blair Fairchild
- Victor Herbert
- Henry F. Gilbert
- Francesco Bartolomeo de Leone
- Alberto Bimboni
