= Harvey Worthington Loomis =

American composer

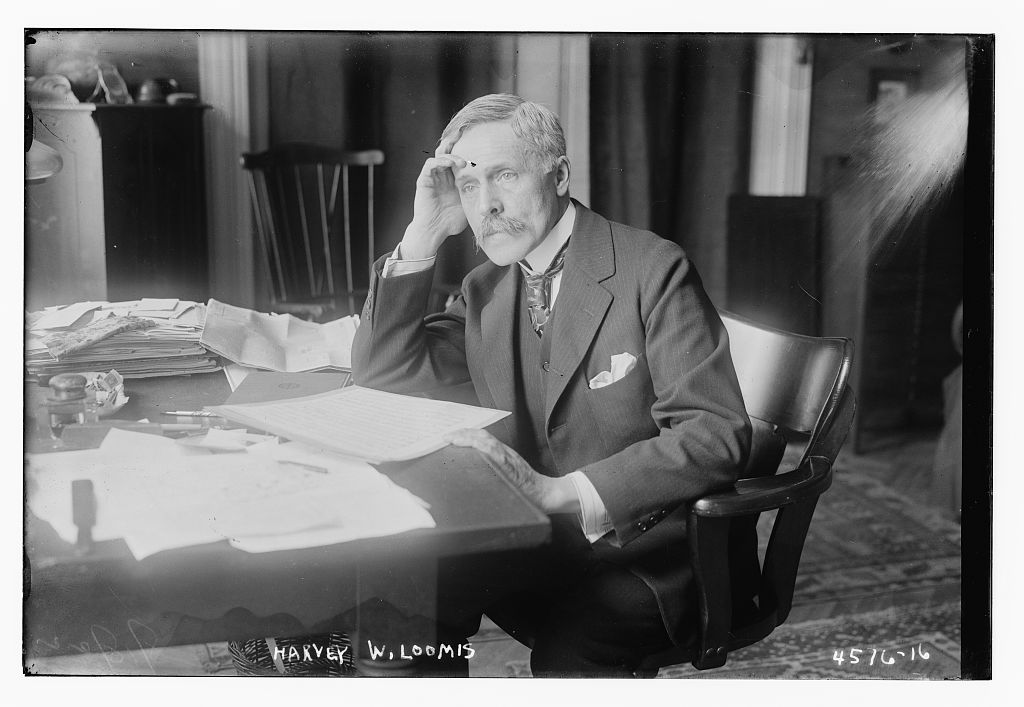
Harvey Worthington Loomis in 1918

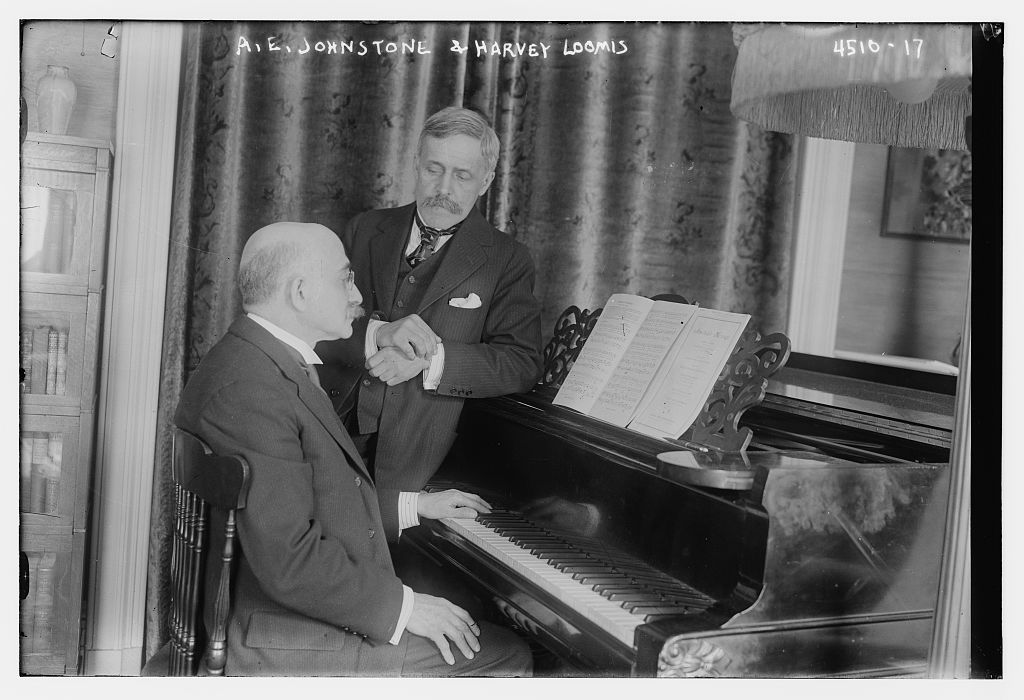
Harvey Worthington Loomis and Arthur Edward Johnstone in 1918

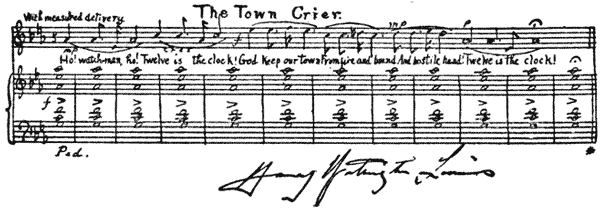
Autograph of music by Loomis

Harvey Worthington Loomis (February 5, 1865, Brooklyn, New York – December 25, 1930, Boston, Massachusetts) was an American composer. He is remembered today for his associations with the Indianist movement and the Wa-Wan Press.

== Biography ==
Loomis was born in Brooklyn, New York, on February 5, 1865. He studied piano with Madeline Schiller. In his youth he won a scholarship of three years' study at the National Conservatory, where he studied with Antonín Dvořák, and quickly became a favored pupil of the Bohemian composer. He gained his greatest fame from the collection Lyrics of the Red Man, settings of American Indian songs rescored for piano. Loomis also composed works for children; also in his catalog may be found numerous stage works, including comic operas and pantomimes; sonatas for violin and for piano; and incidental music to numerous stage plays. Little of his music has been committed to disc, although some of the Lyrics may be found on a recording of Indianist piano music released by Naxos Records on the Marco Polo label.

Loomis died on Christmas Day, December 25, 1930.

== Works ==
- The Mandolin, opera
- The Song of the Pear, melodrama
- The Story of a Faithful Soul, melodrama
- The Maid of Athens, comic opera
- The Burglar's Bride, comic opera
- Going Up?, comic opera
- The Bey of Baba, comic opera
- Put to the Test, musical pantomime
- In Old New Amsterdam, musical pantomime
- The Enchanted Fountain, musical pantomime
- Love and Witchcraft, musical pantomime
- Blanc et Noir, musical pantomime
- Moonlight Serenade (for SAB choir; text by J. Lilian Vandevere; melody by Riccardo Drigo; arr. by Loomis)
