= Ballet Imperial (disambiguation) =

Ballet Imperial was the name initially given to the ballet Tschaikovsky Piano Concerto No. 2 (ballet)

It may also refer to

- Tchaikovsky's Piano Concerto No. 2
- Mariinsky Ballet, formerly known as the Imperial Russian Ballet
- More generally, a style of ballet in Russia
