= Thomas LaFayette Rider =

Cherokee politician

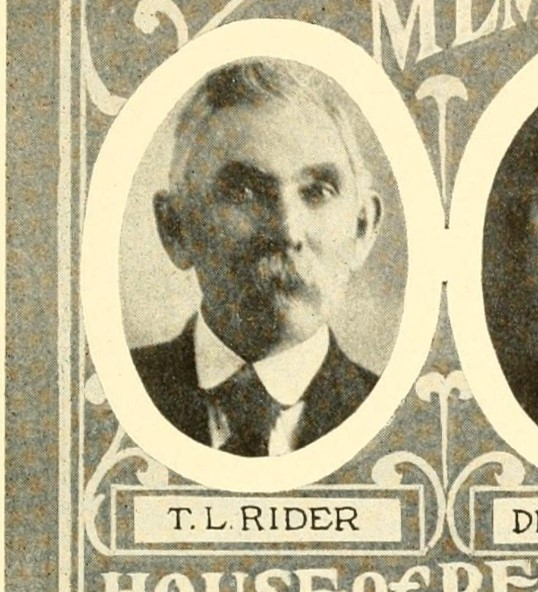

Member of the Oklahoma Senate from the 28th district
- In office November 16, 1916 – November 16, 1920
- Preceded by: M. S. Blassingame
- Succeeded by: E. M. Frye

Member of the Oklahoma House of Representatives from the Adair County district
- In office November 16, 1912 – November 16, 1914
- Preceded by: George W. Smith
- Succeeded by: Thomas J. Welch
- In office November 16, 1907 – November 16, 1910
- Preceded by: Position established
- Succeeded by: George W. Smith

Personal details
- Born: Domgeske Unkalunt; April 12, 1856 Goingsnake District, Cherokee Nation
- Died: September 20, 1932 (aged 76)
- Citizenship: Cherokee Nation; American
- Party: Democratic Party
- Children: Atalie Unkalunt
- Parent: Charles Augustus Rider (father)

Thomas LaFayette Rider (April 12, 1856 – September 20, 1932) was a Cherokee politician who served in the Oklahoma House of Representatives and Oklahoma Senate.

== Biography ==
Thomas LaFayette Rider was born on April 12, 1856, in the Going Snake District of the Cherokee Nation, Indian Territory, to Charles Augustus Rider and Mary Bigbey. Charles Rider served on the Cherokee National Council. Thomas Rider attended the Cherokee National Male Seminary in Tahlequah starting in 1870. He married Josephine Pace in 1879. At 29, he became a Methodist preacher. He served in the Oklahoma House of Representatives from 1907 to 1910 and 1912 to 1914. He also served in the Oklahoma Senate between 1916 and 1920. After his time in the state Senate, he served as a postmaster.

Among his 13 children was Sunshine Rider, the musician, writer, and Native American activist.

He was a member of the Democratic Party. He died on September 20, 1932.
