= Frank Addison Porter =

American pianist and composer

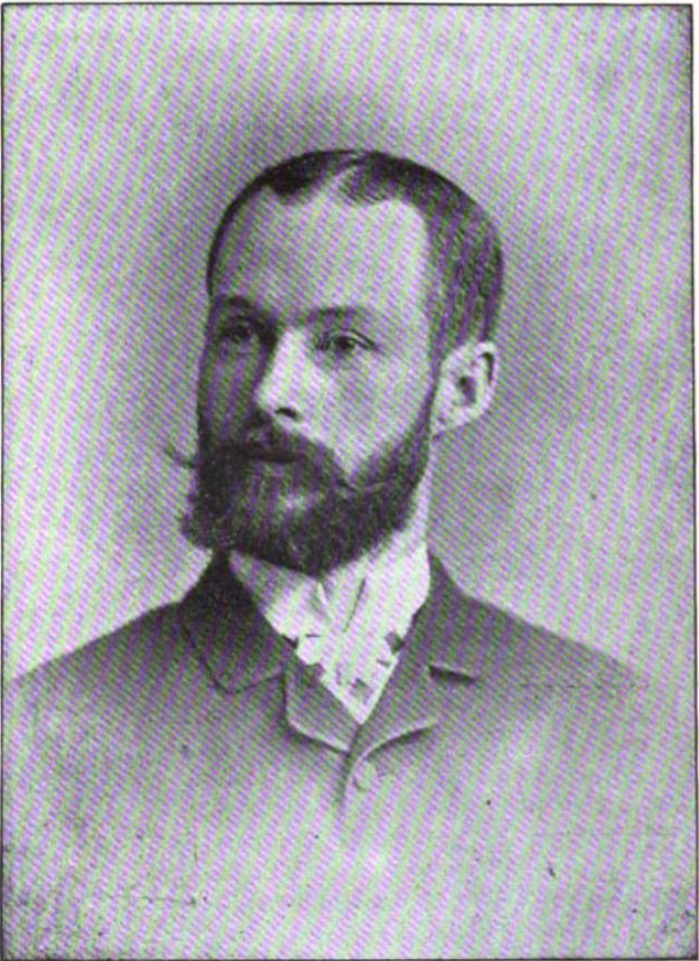
F. Addison Porter

Frank Addison Porter was an American pianist and composer connected for most of his career with the New England Conservatory of Music in Boston. His music was frequently published under the name F. Addison Porter.

He was born September 3, 1859 in Dixmont, Maine. In 1877 he was engaged as tenor and sometime organist at St. Mary's Catholic church at Bangor, Maine. He went to Boston and entered the Conservatory in 1879, graduating in 1884. During the five years there he studied the piano, the organ, theory, counterpoint, vocal music and the art of conducting. Among his teachers were Alfred Dudley Turner, Dunham, Emery, Parker, George Chadwick, Tamburello and Zerrahn. Immediately after graduating he was engaged as a piano teacher by the conservatory. He went to Germany to study in Leipzig in 1893.

Porter's published works include a prelude and fugue in E minor, mazourkas, nocturnes, songs for soprano and tenor, a contralto solo with violin obligato, a Festival March for two pianos, a Serenade for violin and piano, an overture for four hands, and an operetta.

He also composed a great number of beginner/educational songs, and pedagogical writings include a set of Practical Finger Exercises. He edited and published many of his former teacher Turner's etudes.

He and his wife Laura Huxtable Porter ran a private summer piano school in Boston in the 1920s. He directed the Allston Musical Improvement Society. He had a summer residence in Unity, Maine he named The White Birches. Porter died in Belmont, Massachusetts in 1941.

== Selected compositions ==
- With Light Hearts, Op 11 No 2, a beginner's waltz for piano six hands
- In The Springtime, Op. 15 a set of eight easy/educational pieces for piano, consisting of:
  - At Night, with epigram by Elaine Goodale
  - The Fairy Hunt, with epigram by Elaine Goodale
  - Vision, with epigram by Elaine Goodale
  - Spring's Greeting, with epigram by Elaine Goodale
  - A Bird at Twilight, epigram by Dora Read Goodale
  - Evening Song, epigram by Dora Read Goodale
  - Fire-Flies, epigram by Rosidda
  - Dance of the Fairies, epigram from The Maid's Metamorphosis
- Practical Finger Exercises, Op. 17
- Melody in G, Op. 23 for piano
- Humoresque, Op. 25 for piano, published by Wa-Wan Press
- Prelude No. 1 in D minor, Op. 28 for piano
- Intermediate and Advanced Technique, Op. 31
- Etude Melodique, Op. 33 for piano left hand
- Seven and Twenty Easy Pieces
- Steven Times Four, song
- Earth in Heavenly Rest, song
- Meditation
- A Song of March, written circa 1900
- Seven Short Responses, written circa Dec 1902, for quartet or chorus.
- The Tale of Meoul Ki Ning, for piano, inspired by Lord Dunsany
