= Simon Bucharoff =

American musician and educator (1881–1955)

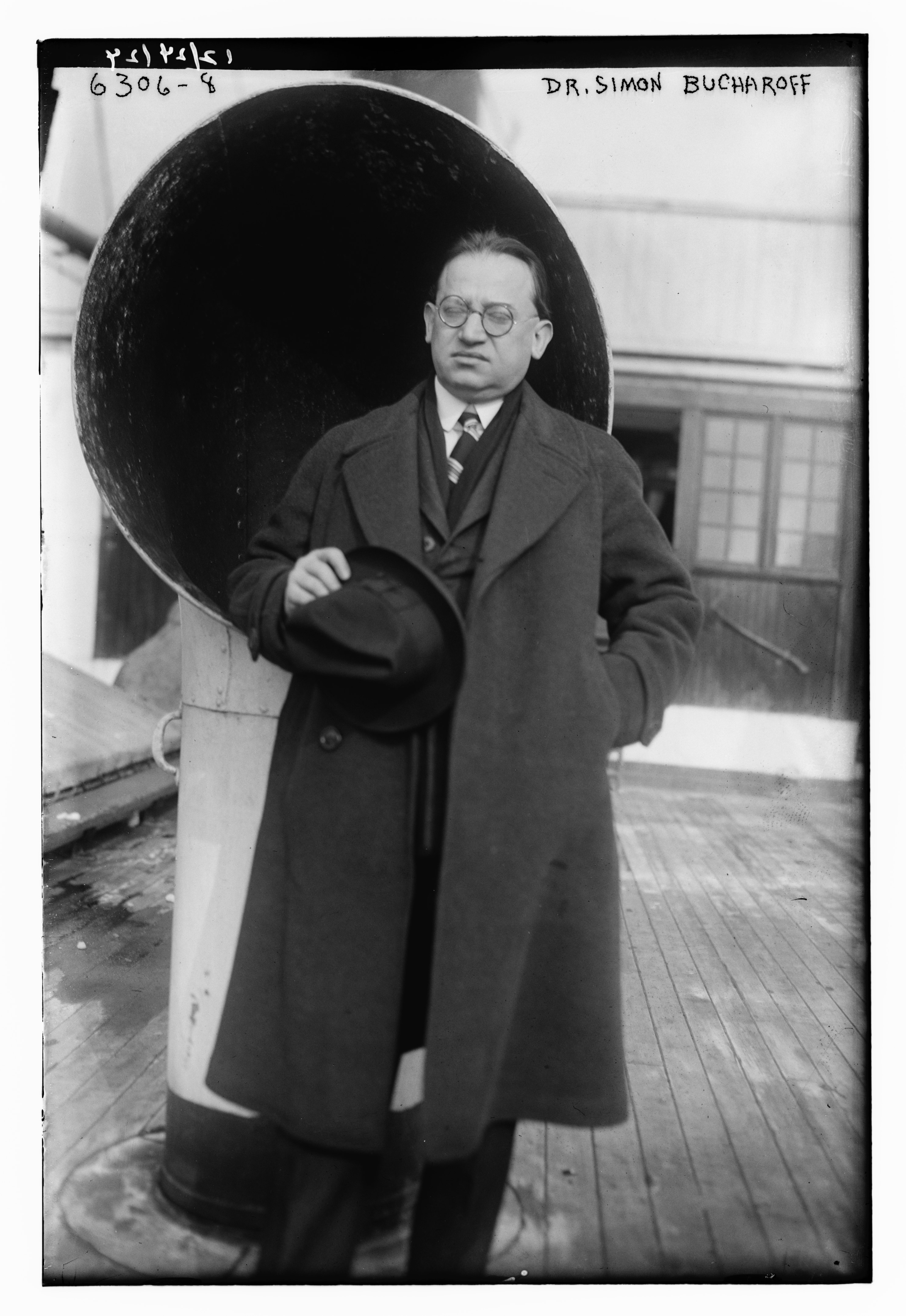
- Bucharoff in 1925

Background information
- Born: Simon Buchhalter; April 20, 1881; Berdychiv, Russian Empire (present-day Ukraine)
- Died: November 24, 1955 (aged 74) Chicago, Illinois, U.S.
- Genres: Classical
- Occupations: Pianist, composer, educator
- Instrument: Piano

Simon Bucharoff (April 20, 1881 – November 24, 1955, born Simon Buchhalter) was an American pianist, composer and educator.

== Life and career ==
Bucharoff was born in Berdychiv, Russian Empire. His father was a cantor. His brother Isadore Buchhalter was also a pianist and educator who settled in Chicago. His family emigrated to New York when he was 11, where he began his piano studies with Paolo Gallico and Leopold Kramer. He returned to Europe and graduated from the Vienna Conservatory in 1902, having studied piano with Julius Epstein and Emil Sauer and composition with Stephen Stocker and Robert Fuchs.

He married Jennie G. Bluestone in 1902, and became a US citizen in 1904. He joined the Wichita College of Music in 1907, and in 1911 moved to Chicago and began focusing on composition. future US Vice President Charles Dawes was a patron, his first opera A Lover's Knot was produced in 1916 (and saw a revival in 1923), and Harold Arlen was among his composition students.

In 1919, he changed his last name from Buchhalter to Bucharoff and moved to Europe in an attempt to further his composition career. After failing to produce an opera based on André Geiger's La Reine amoureuse with Pierre Maudru, he moved to Germany and succeeded in producing his next opera Sakhara in 1924.

His fortunes in Europe began to turn. There were disputes about revenue from Sakhara. The climate for Jewish musicians in Germany exiled him to Italy, he left the score with Hofmeister in Leipzig; in the meantime, his planned production and publication of a new opera Der Golem with was pre-empted by Eugen D'Albert's Der Golem. He never stopped trying to get paid for Sakhara; even posthumously his family fought for restitution via the War Claims Act, and he attempted to reconstruct the opera.

Upon returning to America in the 1920s, his works received prominent performances by the New York Philharmonic and at the Hollywood Bowl. But he never found commercial success as a composer. He attempted to convince Eugene O'Neill to let him adapt The Emperor Jones to the opera stage. By 1934 he was living in Los Angeles, and the Great Depression found him unemployed. He was among many artists who entreated the Federal Emergency Relief Administration (FERA) to for grants and employment; Bucharoff wrote to Harry Hopkins directly.

In 1937 he began working as a music editor and orchestrator for Warner Brothers. Among the films he orchestrated were Devotion, Of Human Bondage, The Sea Hawk and The Big Sleep (all composed by fellow Austrians Max Steiner and Erich Korngold).

Bucharoff was a member of the American Society of Composers, Authors and Publishers (ASCAP), and received the Bispham Memorial Medal Award for Sakhara. He died in Chicago. His archives are held at the University of North Texas.

== Works ==
=== Musical works ===
Operas:

- The Lover's Knot, libretto by Cora Bennett-Stephenson, premiered January 16, 1916 by Chicago Opera Company, conducted by Cleofonte Campanini published 1916 by Schirmer
- Sakhara, libretto by Isabel Buckingham, premiered October 29, 1924, by Oper Frankfurt, Germany
- Jewel: The Everlasting Man
- Addio
- Wastrel

Choral:

- Salute to a Free World
- Freedom on the March
- Hear My Voice, O Lord
- Jerusalem

Orchestral:

- Four Tone Poems
- The Wanderers Song
- The Trumpeters Death (piano and orchestra)
- America
- Moses
- Prelude
- Valse Brillante
- Das Sterbe-Glöcklein
- Capriccio

For baritone and orchestra:

- Parable of Nothin' and Somethin'
- O Ye Peoples and Nations
- Rejoicing
- Laugh and Laugh and Laugh

=== Books ===
- The Modern Pianist's Text Book
