= Alfred Dudley Turner =

American composer

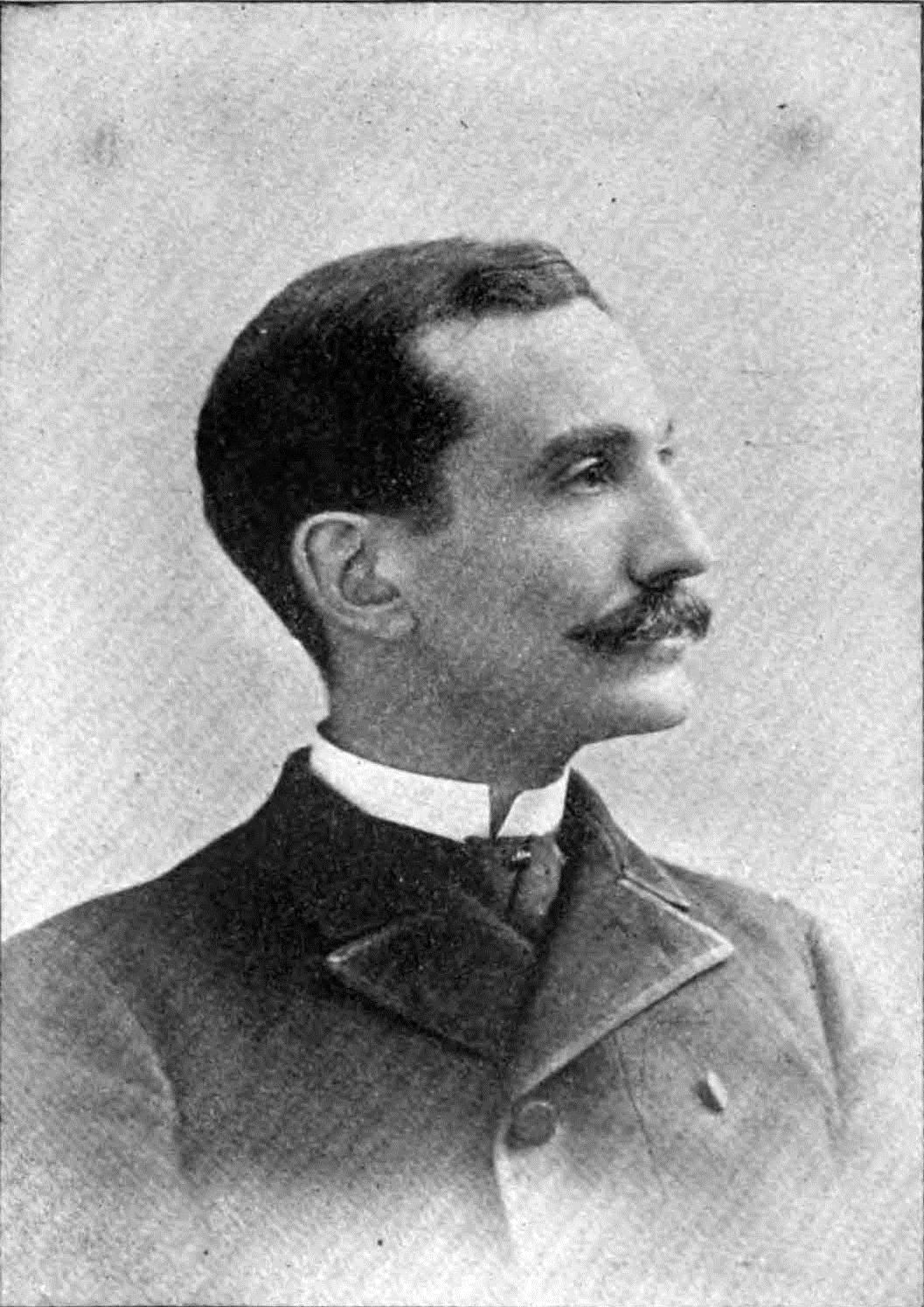
- Alfred Dudley Turner
- Born: August 24, 1854; St. Albans, Maine
- Died: May 7, 1888 (aged 33); Auburn, Maine
- Resting place: Village Cemetery, St. Albans (city), Maine
- Occupation: Composer

Alfred Dudley Turner (24 August 1854 – 7 May 1888) was an American educator and composer.

He was born in St. Albans, Maine. After displaying unusual musical ability, as a child he went to Boston to study piano at the New England Conservatory, where his teachers included J. C. D. Parker and Madeline Schiller.

Turner was an 1876 graduate of Boston University College of Music. He became an instructor at the New England Conservatory. Among his students were Charles Dennée and Frank Addison Porter.

He died at his home in Auburn, Maine of an illness. A large collection of his manuscripts are archived at the Library of Congress.

== Selected works ==
Turner produced 36 numbered compositions, mostly of piano and chamber music. Among them are:

- A Romance
- Berceuse
- 6 Concert Etudes (Octave Valse Brillante, Expansion, Humoresque, "If I Were a Bird" à la Henselt, Maestoso, Wild Rider)
- Valse Souvenir
- Piano Quintet
- 6 Studies in Double Thirds, Op. 14
- 6 Preludes, Op. 15
- Etudes de Concert, Op. 16 (No. 1 5/4 rhythm)
- 2 Syncopation Studies, Op. 24
- 2 New Etudes, Op. 25 "Designed for the cultivation of ease and grace in the performance of rapid passages requiring a crossing of the hands for the pianoforte"
- 15 Melodious Studies for Piano, Op. 30
- Christmas Suite for piano, Op. 33
- Sonata for cello and piano, Op. 34

He also wrote the piano technique book A complete set of scales for the Piano-Forte (including double thirds, double sixths, arpeggios in all forms, Octaves, etc., carefully fingered from Dreyschock, Plaidy, and Köhler). It was first published in 1879 by the New England Conservatory, and reprinted nearly 20 years after his death in a 1907 edition.
