= Caroline Holme Walker =

Caroline Holme Walker (June 14, 1863 – January 19, 1955) was an American composer, pianist, and teacher who transcribed bird songs into standard musical notation. She was born in St. Louis, Missouri.

Walker studied with Anna Strothotte, James North, and Robert Goldbeck in St. Louis. After moving to Denver, Colorado, she studied with Linda Ostrander. She married John M. Walker in 1885, and they had a daughter (Elizabeth) before divorcing in 1911.

Walker was one of the founders of the Tuesday Musical Club in Denver. She taught at the Wolcott Conservatory and maintained a private studio at Brinton Terrace, along with other musicians such as Lola Carrier Worrell. Walker published at least one article, "Bird Songs from the Musician's Point of View," in the journal Country Life in America (1907), which described how she transcribed 31 meadowlark songs into standard musical notation. Her composition Thrush Song was based on the song of the veery thrush. In 1927, she gave a talk on "Music in Poetry – Poetry in Music" at the Denver Library.

Walker's music was published by B. F. Wood Music Company, G. Schirmer Inc., Theodore Presser Company, and Wa-Wan Press. Her published songs include:

- "Battle of Life" (words by Nancy B. Turner; included in Five Songs with Piano Accompaniment)
- "Good Night"
- "Lonely Garden"
- "May Madrigal" (words by Frank Dempster Sherman; included in Five Songs with Piano Accompaniment)
- "Plainsman's Song"
- "Thrush Song" (words by S. Stephens; included in Five Songs with Piano Accompaniment; based on the song of the veery thrush)
- "To a Letter" (words by S. Stephens; included in Five Songs with Piano Accompaniment)
- "When the Dew is Falling" (words by Fiona Macleod)
- "Your Kiss" (words by Gouverneur Morris; (included in Five Songs with Piano Accompaniment)
