= Frank Dempster Sherman =

American poet and academic (1860–1916)

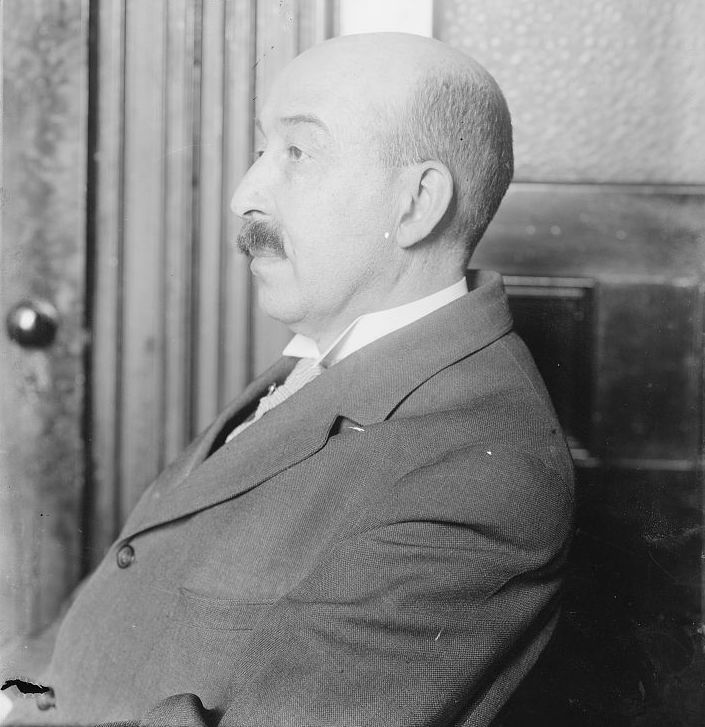
- Frank Dempster Sherman circa 1900
- Born: May 6, 1860; Peekskill
- Died: September 19, 1916; New York City

Frank Dempster Sherman (May 6, 1860 – September 19, 1916), sometimes writing as Felix Carmen, was an American poet and academic.

Frank Dempster Sherman was born on May 6, 1860, in Peekskill, New York, to Lucy (MacFarland) and John Dempster Sherman. He attended Columbia College from 1879 to 1884, graduating with a PhB in architecture.

Sherman began teaching at Columbia in 1887. He held various positions there and ultimately became a professor of graphics in 1904. He died on September 19, 1916, in New York City.

Sherman published some poetry as Felix Carmen. American composer Caroline Holme Walker (1863–1955) used Sherman's text for her song "May Madrigal".

== Publications ==
- Madrigals and Catches (1887)
- New Waggings of Old Tales, with John Kendrick Bangs (1888)
- Lyrics for a Lute (1890)
- Little-Folk Lyrics (1892)
- Lyrics of Joy (1904)
- A Southern Flight, with Clinton Scollard (1905)
- The Poems (1917)
