= Theodore Stearns =

American classical composer

Theodore Pease Stearns (1881–1935) was an American composer. Born in Berea, Ohio, he wrote a number of operas. Of these, The Snowbird was given at the Chicago Civic Opera in 1923; this work won the Bispham Memorial Medal Award. He taught music at the University of California, Los Angeles from 1932 until 1935.
