= Carlos Troyer =

American composer (1837–1920)

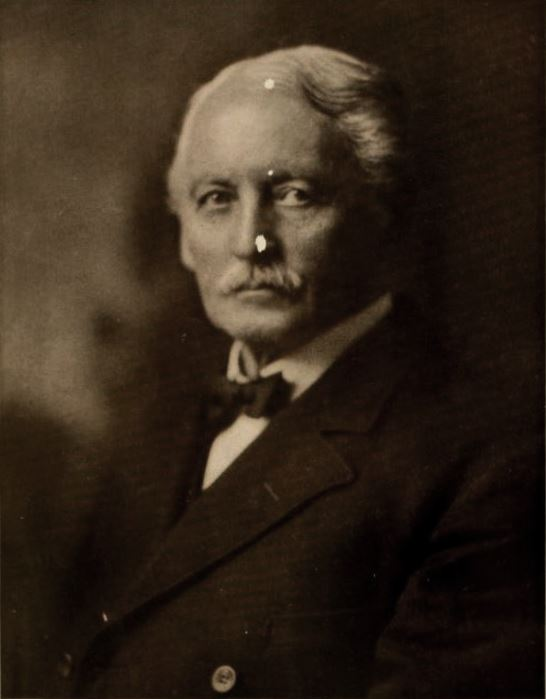
From a 1909 magazine

Carlos Troyer (January 12, 1837 – July 26, 1920), born Charles Troyer, was an American composer known for his musical arrangements of traditional Native American melodies.

== Biography ==
Born in Frankfurt, Germany, Troyer settled in San Francisco sometime before 1871, where he became known as a violinist, pianist and teacher of music and began using the name Carlos.

In 1880 he performed the wedding march at Michael Henry de Young's wedding. In the late 1880s he composed the music for a number of charity revues produced and written by Ella Sterling Cummins. He taught Cummins' daughter Viva D. Cummins, who eventually launched a series of concerts on the east coast presenting various Indian music in costume.

Troyer held an interest in the natural sciences. In 1874, Troyer was elected a life member of the California Academy of Sciences. For most of the 1880s and 1890s he was its librarian. During a naturalist expedition to Baja for the Academy, Gustav Eisen attempted to name a peak in the Sierra de la Laguna after Troyer and fellow Academy trustee E. J. Molera. He was a member of the San Francisco Microscopical Society.

In 1886, his publication of a transcription/adaptation of Apache Chief Geronimo's Own Medicine Song marked the beginning of a long professional interest in Native American music. Throughout the 1880s he published several transcriptions and arrangements of Native American songs, including those recounted by Frank Hamilton Cushing. Eventually, his works became further romanticized and amerindian, culminating in his final published piece, Midnight Visit to the Sacred Shrines, a Zuñian Ritual.

He is frequently included in the list of the Indianist composers; Farwell's Wa-Wan Press published many of his transcriptions/harmonizations. Many of his earlier compositions were published by A. Waldteufel in San Francisco; later in his life Theodore Presser Co published many of his Native American transcriptions and songs.

A brief autobiography, provided with his 1913 published lecture notes on Native American music, indicates he spent time "in the field" with the Zunis and Apaches recording and transcribing their music, possibly while employed for the government, and mentioned similar travels to Brazil. Contemporaries including Charles Lummis and Frederick W. Hodge noted these claims as lies or exaggerations, intended to boost credibility for his lecture tours later in life. With the possible exception of Barbara Tedlock in her Songs of the Zuni, modern critical analysis of the ethnographic value of Troyer's transcriptions are negative.

Several of Troyer's transcriptions have been identified as likely sources of musical borrowing by Puccini for themes in La Fanciulla del West.

He taught at Mills College. He died in Berkeley, California at the age of 83. His wife Virginia died shortly after.

== Selected Compositions ==
- I Dreamed We Two Were Friends Again (1856)
- The Spider and the Fly (1882) for two voices, dedicated to Lena Hamilton and Lottie Calsing.
- Songs of the Sunset Land (Published in San Francisco in 1884 by A. Waldteufel) Includes the following musical settings:
  1. Song of the Sunset Land (originally composed for the 1884 Admission Day celebrations for California's 34th anniversary of admittance to the Union)
  2. Lead Thy Mother Tenderly
  3. The Funny Old Man in the Moon
  4. Swing Song (text by William Neale Lockington, fellow officer of the California Academy of Sciences)
  5. Song of the Little People
  6. Baby Bye
  7. 'Tis Time I Should Forget
  8. The Raftman's Song
  9. Slumber Song
  10. I Love the Old Songs Most
  11. Mooley Cow
  12. Fortune's Wheel
- Apache Chief Geronimo's Own Medicine Song (1886) (This was later arranged for chorus by Albert Israel Elkus)
- A Children's Night (1888) (operetta, lyrics by Ella Sterling Cummins, premiered at a children's party hosted by Alpheus Bull)
- Princess of Topolobampo (1888) (comic operetta, lyrics by Ella Sterling Cummins, composed for a benefit concert for the Occidental Kindergarten in San Francisco)
- Millenium March, (1890) (written for a charity revue for the San Francisco kindergarten system)
- Arabian Nights Entertainment and Merchants' Caravan, (1891) (music written for a charity revue for Home for Incurables, produced by Ella Sterling Cummins and the King's Daughters). Included the song Why He Left Town, which Troyer self-published the next month.
- Two Zuñi Songs (1893) (Lover's Wooing or Blanket Song, Zunian Lullaby). Transcriptions and harmonizations of songs recounted to Troyer by Frank Hamilton Cushing during Cushing's lectures at the California Academy of Sciences.
- Invocation to the Sun God
- The Golden Corn, anthemic setting of Edna Dean Proctor's poem Columbia's Emblem, premiered May 3 1895 at the annual ball of the St. Andrew's Society.
- The Star-Spangled Banner Concert Paraphrase, piano variations, winner of The Etude composition prize. (1898)
- Apache medicine-chant
- Kiowa-Apache War Dance
- Ghost dance of the Zuñis
- Traditional Songs of the Zuni Indians (Published in 1904 by Theodore Presser Co)
  1. The Sunrise Call, or Echo Song
  2. Incantation upon a Sleeping Infant
  3. Invocation to the Sun-God
  4. Zuni Lover's Wooing, or Blanket Song
  5. The Coming of Montezuma
  6. The Festive Sun Dance of the Zunis
  7. The Great Rain Dance of the Zunis
  8. Indian Fire Drill Song
  9. Hymn to the Sun
  10. Sunset Song
  11. Ghost Dance of the Zunis, with ad lib
- Dreamland, a lullaby (1907)
- Song of the Plains; The Cry of the Cowboy (1908)
- Hymn to the Sun: An Ancient Jubilee Song of the Sun-Worshippers, with Historical Account of the Ceremony and the Derivation of Music from the Sun's Rays (1909, published by Wa-Wan)
- Lebensfreude (1910)
- Midnight Visit to the Sacred Shrines, a Zuñian Ritual: a Monody for Two Flute-trumpets of High and Low Pitch (Clarinet and Oboe); a Traditional Chant of Melodic Beauty, and Parting Song on Leaving the Shrines, with English and Indian Texts … the Accompaniment may be played on the Piano.
- In the Silence: a psychic tone-picture
- Traditional Songs of the Zuni Indians (Published in 1914 by Theodore Presser Co):
  1. Kiowa Apache War Dance (instrumental)
  2. Zuñian "Kor-Kok-Shi" clown dance
  3. Hunting song of the Cliff-dwellers
  4. Apache medicine chant
  5. Awakening at dawn (a processional chant)
  6. Recall of the tribal hunters
- Columbus (1915), setting of the Joaquin Miller poem, dedicated to Dr. George Wharton James of Pasadena, California.
- Zuniana (1916) A music drama in three acts based on his Native American songs and on his music lectures.

== See also ==
- Indianist movement
