= John Laurence Seymour =

American musician

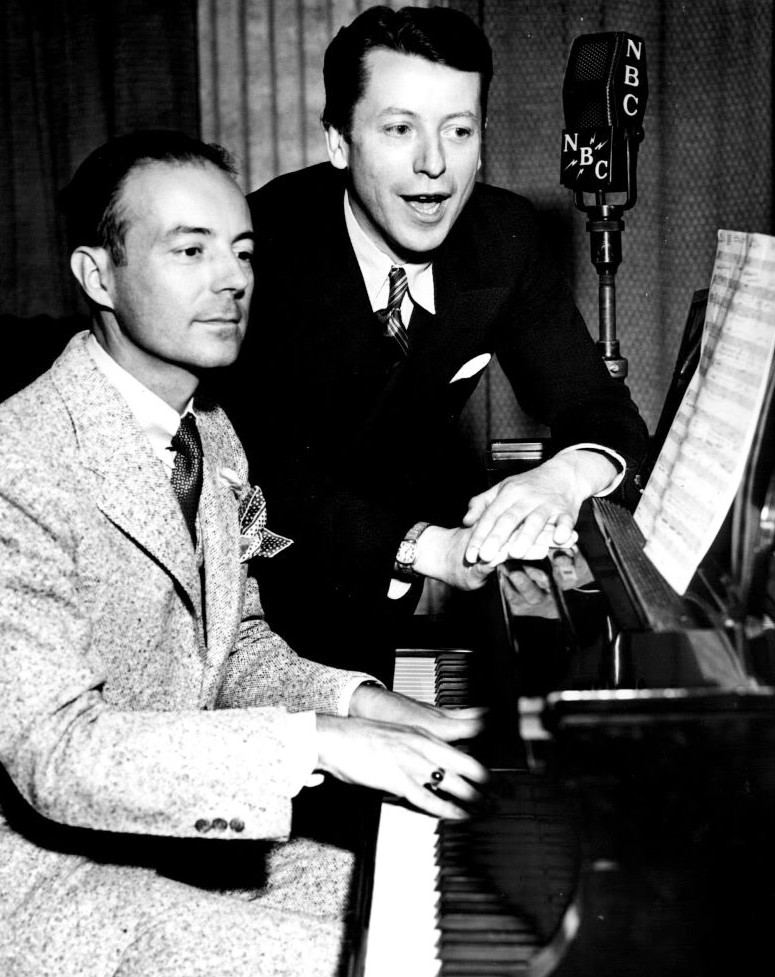
- Seymour (at piano) with vocalist John Teel in 1936
- Born: January 18, 1893; Los Angeles, California
- Died: February 1, 1986 (aged 93)

John Laurence Seymour (January 18, 1893, in Los Angeles – February 1, 1986, in San Francisco) was an American composer and playwright. As a composer Seymour is best known for his operas, which have "complex orchestral textures and italianate lyricism".

== Early life and education ==
John Laurence Seymour was born on January 18, 1893, in Los Angeles, California. His parents were John L. Symour and Rose Anna La Pointe. He grew up in Sacramento, California. He attended Polytechnic High. Seymour graduated from the University of California, Berkeley, in 1917 with a degree in Letters and Sciences. While in school he became a member of Phi Beta Kappa Society. He also obtained a degree in Russian in 1919.

Seymour had a great interest in music. He played the violin. In 1922, he traveled to Europe. From 1923 to 1928, Seymour studied composition in Italy with Ildebrando Pizzetti and Felice Boghen. He also studied with Vincent d'Indy in France. In 1932, he traveled to Japan.

== Career ==
Seymour initially became a teacher, and was part of the faculty at Berkeley where he lectured mostly on opera and drama from 1928 to 1936. During this time, he also served as the head of the drama department at the Sacramento Junior College, a position he held until 1950. In 1940 he earned his PhD in English literature from Berkeley. His dissertation was called Drama and Libretto and was an adaptation of two of Shakespeare plays. That same year, he became a member of the American Society of Composers, Authors and Publishers (ASCAP). He later became a librarian at Southern Utah College in Cedar City, Utah from 1969 to 1985.

=== Compositions ===
One of Seymour's operas, In the Pasha's Garden, received the Bispham Memorial Medal Award. The opera was based on a story from H. G. Dwight. It was first performed on January 24, 1935, at the Metropolitan Opera under the baton of Ettore Panizza, with Lawrence Tibbett in the title role. The performance was not well received. In fact, it was called "just plain silly." The production was fifty-five minutes long and only one act. The score was published by Tin Pan Alley, and was originally called The Eunuch. At the time the opera was published, Seymour was 41 years old. The opening premiere of the opera's matinee performance was a fundraiser for the Southern Woman's Educational Alliance. The opera was performed three times total between its premiere and February 13, 1935. After the performance, Seymour was given the Bispham Memorial Medal Award. After receiving negative criticism for set design and composition, Seymour returned to California. He would not compose for years to come.

He wrote another opera, Ollanta, el Jefe Kolla, that received awards in the cultural division of the Bolivarian Games in La Paz in 1977. Seymour was also skilled in learning languages, and translated several dramas from French and Russian into English.

== Later life ==
Seymour was a member of the Church of Jesus Christ of Latter-day Saints. No other Mormon composer has had their work performed at the Metropolitan Opera. He was given an honorary Doctor of Letters from Southern Utah State College (now Southern Utah University).

Before his death in 1986, he wrote a short autobiography which is now held in the L. Tom Perry Special Collections at Brigham Young University. Seymour is buried in the Evergreen Cemetery in Los Angeles.

== Selected works ==
Stage

- The Bachelor Belles, Operetta in 3 acts, Op. 13 (1935); libretto by Rose A. Seymour
- In the Pasha's Garden, Opera in 1 act, Op. 17 (1934); libretto by Henry Chester Tracy based on the book by Harrison Griswold Dwight; recipient of the Bispham Memorial Medal Award
- The Two Gentlemen of Verona, Comic Operetta in 2 acts, Op. 35 (1937); libretto by Henry Chester Tracy after the play by William Shakespeare
- Golden Days, Comic Operetta in 2 acts, Op. 40 (1936); libretto by Ralph Birchard
- Hollywood Madness, Comic Opera in 3 acts, Op. 41 (1936); libretto by Ralph Birchard
- Ming Toy, Musical Comedy in prologue and 2 acts (1949); book by Leslie H. Carter; lyrics and music by John Laurence Seymour
- Ramona, Opera in 5 acts and epilogue; libretto by Henry Chester Tracy; based on the romance by Helen Hunt Jackson

Chamber music

- Elegiac Tone Poem No. 2 in F minor for viola and piano (1946)
- From the Far-off Hills for cello and piano, Op. 47 No. 1 (1947)
- A Song on the Road for cello and piano, Op. 47 No. 2 (1947)

Vocal

- Shilric's Song for low voice and piano, Op. 23 No. 1 (1936); words from Ossian by James Macpherson
- A Dirge for Ryno for low voice and piano, Op. 23 No. 3 (1936); words from Ossian by James Macpherson
- Behold, I Stand at the Door for low voice and piano (1945); words by Alma Strettell
