= Lola Carrier Worrell =

American composer

Lola Carrier Worrell (1 July 1870 – 29 January 1929) was an American composer who wrote instrumental music, songs, and at least one piece for musical theatre. Born in St. Johns, Michigan, she studied music with Carlos Sobimo, Francis Hendricks and Horace E Tureman. Lola married Edward S. Worrell Jr. on January 12, 1891, and they had three daughters. The family maintained homes in New York and Colorado, where Lola founded the Denver American Music Society and served as its first president. She also organized and served as the pianist for the Chamber Music Quintet of Denver. Along with other musicians such as Caroline Holme Walker, Lola maintained a studio at Brinton Terrace in Denver, where she coached pianists, singers, and young composers. She gave recitals with contralto Louis Merten, whom she accompanied on piano. In addition to her work as a musician, Lola filed patents for dolls she developed in 1922, 1924, and 1925. The 1925 patent application described the doll as a "flapper doll." Her compositions included:

== Instrumental ==
- Melodie (violin and piano)
- Sonata Fantasy (violin and piano)

== Musical Theatre ==
- Babylonia (libretto by Lola Carrier Worrell and Hugh Abercrombie Anderson)

== Songs ==
- Absence: Love Lyrics #2 (words by John B. Tabb)
- Autumn Bacchanal (words by Gertrude Rogers)
- Autumn Reverie
- Ballads from Over the Sea
- Celtic Love Song
- Cloris Sleeping: Ballads from Over the Sea #3 (words by DeLancy Pierson)
- Eternal Love: Love Lyrics #3 (words by J. A. Edgerton)
- Hohe Liebe: German Songs #2 (words by John Ludwig Uhland; translation by Gertrude F. Hack)
- I'm Coming Back, My Honey Lou
- In a Garden: Love Lyrics #4 (words by Douglas Hemingway)
- It is June
- O Mistress Mine: Ballads from Over the Sea #4 (words from Twelfth Night by Shakespeare)
- Pine Tree (Der Fichtenbaum): German Songs #1 (words by Heinrich Heine; translation by Mrs. J. G. McMurray)
- Rosy O'Grady
- Soldier Boys
- Song of the Chimes (subtitle Cradle Song; for women's choir)
- Waiting: Love Lyrics #1 (words by Myrtle Reed)
- Who Knows?
