= Comedy Overture on Negro Themes =

1910 concert overture by Henry F. Gilbert

The Comedy Overture on Negro Themes is a concert overture composed in 1910 by Henry F. Gilbert; it was first performed in Central Park, New York City, by the Municipal Symphony on August 17, 1910. The piece derives its main melodic material from three black folk songs. The first is from the Bahamas, while the second ("I'se Gwine to Alabamy", a Mississippi roustabout song) and third ("Old Ship of Zion", used as the subject of a fugue) are American.
