= Frederick Ayres =

American composer

Frederick Ayres AKA Fredric Ayres Johnaon (March 17, 1876 – November 23, 1926) was an American composer. Born in Binghamton, New York, he studied at Cornell University; further study, this time in music, came with Edgar Stillman Kelley and Arthur Foote. Ayres lived in Colorado Springs, Colorado for many years, during which time he became a "musical spokesman" for the Rocky Mountain area; he died there in 1926. Among his compositions were an overture, From the Plains; a string quartet and some other pieces of chamber music, and some songs.
