= Carl Hugo Grimm =

American composer (1890–1978)

Carl Hugo Grimm (October 31, 1890 – October 1978) was an American composer.

== Biography ==
He was born on October 31, 1890, in Zanesville, Ohio. He received his early musical instruction from his father after moving to Cincinnati as a child. He was largely self-taught as a composer, though he did have lessons with Edgar Stillman Kelley and Frank van der Stucken. In 1927 his Erotic Poem received an award of $1000 from the National Federation of Music Clubs and in 1930 a choral work, The Song of Songs, received $1000 as well, this from the MacDowell Club. His orchestral works were played by the Chicago Symphony Orchestra and the Cincinnati Orchestra; he also composed chamber music, some choral works, and songs. He died in Cincinnati, where he served as an organist for many years at various churches, and where he had led the composition department of the Cincinnati Conservatory of Music from 1931 until 1952. He died in October 1978 in Cincinnati, Ohio.
