= Francesco Bartolomeo de Leone =

American composer (1887–1948)

Francesco Bartolomeo DeLeone in 1924.

Francesco Bartolomeo DeLeone (July 28, 1887 – December 10, 1948) was an American composer of Italian descent.

Born in Ravenna, Ohio, to a family of Italian immigrants from Colliano (near Salerno, Italy), at fifteen DeLeone entered the Dana Musical Institute at Warren, Ohio. In 1907 he went to Italy to complete his musical education at the Conservatorio Reale di Musica of Naples. Upon his graduation in 1910, his operetta, "A Millionaire's Caprice," had its premiere on July 26, 1910, at the Teatro Eldorado of Naples and was produced throughout Italy. The same year DeLeone returned to America, to be Director of Music in the Municipal University at Akron, Ohio.

During his career DeLeone composed cantatas, songs, and works for piano in addition to opera and operettas. His most successful opera, Alglala, was first produced at the Akron Armory on May 23, 1924. The opera remains one of the best examples of the Indianist movement in American music. The plot was based upon a Native American story; the librettist, Cecil Fanning, drew inspiration from experiences, observations and research during several seasons spent on the Crow reservation in Montana. Presented again in Cleveland, Ohio on November 14 and 15, 1924, the opera won a Bispham Memorial Medal Award and numerous other awards. The composer also received from King Victor Emmanuel III of Italy the title of Chavalier of the Order of the Royal Crown, in recognition of his success in operatic composition.

DeLeone died in Akron, Ohio.

== Bibliography ==
- Howard, John Tasker (1939). Our American Music: Three Hundred Years of It. New York: Thomas Y. Crowell Company.
- Hipsher, Edward Ellsworth (1927). American Opera and Its Composers. Philadelphia.
