= Madeline Schiller =

English-born pianist (1843 - 1911)

Madeline Schiller (also Madeleine Schiller) (November 8, 1843 – July 3, 1911) was an English-born pianist.

Schiller was born in London. After early studies in London with Benjamin Isaacs, Julius Benedict, and Charles Hallé, in 1860 she went to Leipzig where she studied with Ignaz Moscheles. She made her debut there on January 23, 1862, playing Mendelssohn's Piano Concerto No. 1. Among her friends at Leipzig was Arthur Sullivan. She returned to London and performed there, and throughout the country, and briefly in Australia, until her marriage in 1872 to Marcus Elmer Bennett, of Boston, Massachusetts. They moved to the U.S. in 1873, where she quickly became well known for her performances with Theodore Thomas and his orchestra in New York.

After her husband's death, she went back to Europe, living for a while in France. She was invited to play again in New York on November 12, 1881, for the world premiere of Tchaikovsky's Piano Concerto No. 2, with the Philharmonic Society of New York under Theodore Thomas. She remained in New York with her daughter, apart from an Australian tour in 1887–1889 and a brief return to London. She died, aged 67, in New York City.

Madeline Schiller's impact on U.S. music was significant. She played numerous U.S. premieres of works including concertos by Joachim Raff and Camille Saint-Saëns. She also was active as a teacher. Among her students were Alfred Dudley Turner and Harvey Worthington Loomis.
