= Alberto Bimboni =

American composer and conductor

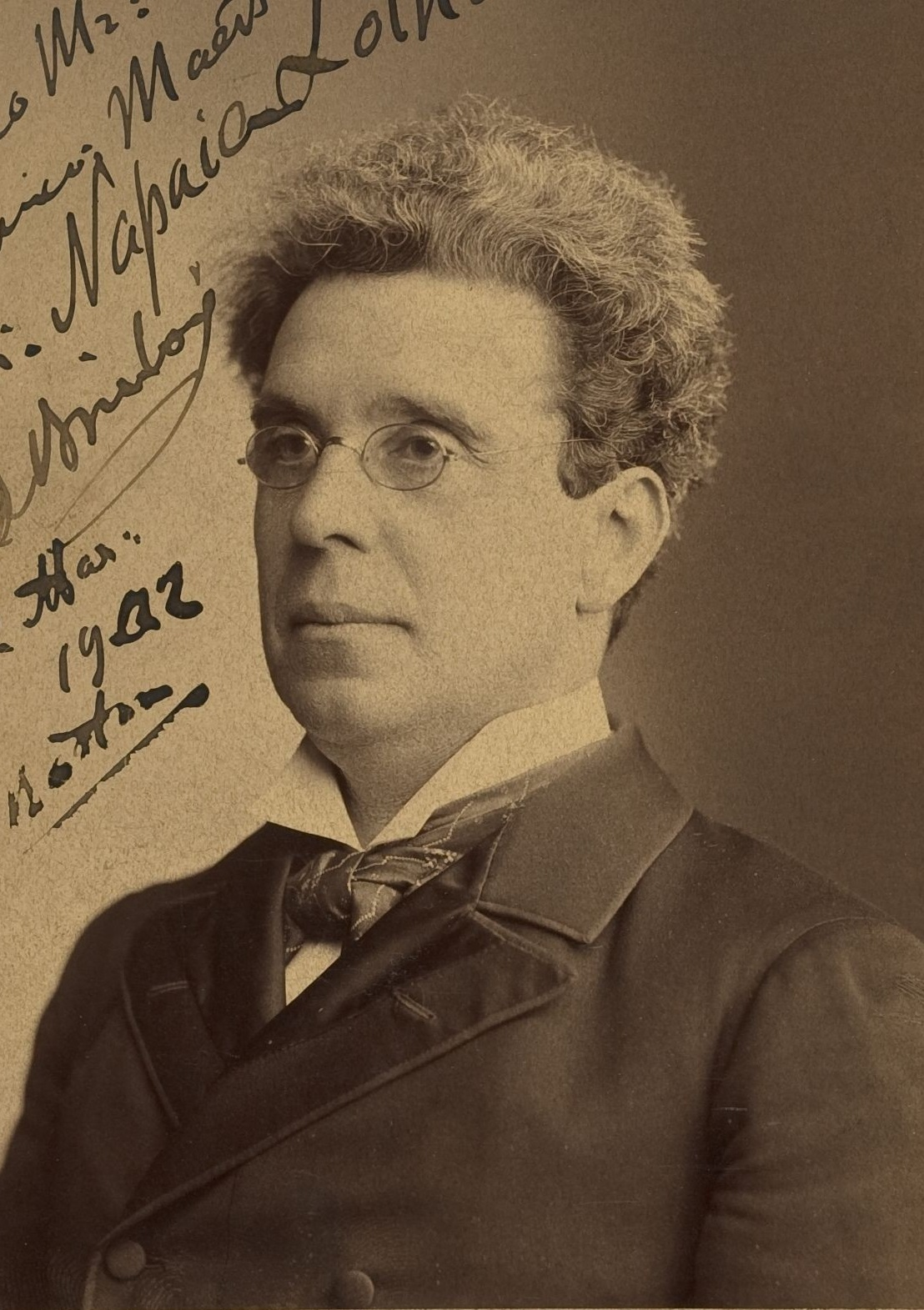
Alberto Bimboni, circa 1902, photo by W. M. Morrison

Alberto Bimboni (1882–1960) was an Italian-born American composer and conductor. He is remembered today, if at all, for his opera Winona; consequently, he is sometimes grouped with other composers of the Indianist movement in American music.

== Biography ==
Born in Florence, Bimboni came to the United States in 1911, immediately finding employment with Henry Savage, who engaged him to conduct his company's tour of Giacomo Puccini's La fanciulla del West. Upon conclusion of the run, he continued to find employment as a conductor in various areas of the country. It was during this period that he became interested in American Indian subjects, and composed Winona to a libretto by a Minneapolis journalist, Perry S. Williams. The story is taken from a legend of the Sioux, and tells of a maiden, named Winona, who threw herself into Lake Pepin to avoid an arranged marriage. The opera's music is heavily based on the music of various Indian tribes, including songs from the Chippewa and Sioux; moccasin, war, and hunting songs are included in the score as well. Bimboni strove not to violate Indian convention; consequently, the choral passages are in unison, with no part-singing.

Bimboni had some difficulty in finding an audience for his work, and kept the score with him when he traveled to conduct. At one engagement, in Washington, D.C., his story caught the attention of then-president Warren G. Harding, who used his influence to try to have it performed. Winona finally saw the stage in Portland, Oregon in 1926; at a performance in Minneapolis two years later, the composer was awarded the Bispham Memorial Medal Award for his work in promoting American opera.

Bimboni wrote little else besides Winona, although one of his songs was recorded by John McCormack. From 1930 to 1942 he was a teacher at the Curtis Institute in Philadelphia, and since 1933 also at the Opera Department at Juilliard School of Music in New York. For eighteen years, he directed the summer season in Chautauqua, New York, and from 1942 was director of the opera company of Canton (Ohio). He has been listed as one of Gian-Carlo Menotti's instructors. He died in New York in 1960.
