= Bispham Memorial Medal Award =

Award for opera in English

The Bispham Memorial Medal Award was an award for operas written in English which was named for baritone David Bispham, who was a great proponent of performing opera in English in the United States. It was traditionally awarded to American composers, frequently for an opera on an American subject. It originated from the Opera in Our Language Foundation, Inc., founded by composer Eleanor Everest Freer, and Edith Rockefeller McCormick, in 1921. After David Bispham's death in October 1921, Eleanor Everest Freer also founded the David Bispham Memorial Fund, Inc., in March 1922. Eleanor Everest Freer was chairman, and Edith Rockefeller McCormick was treasurer, of both organizations. On April 7, 1924, the two organizations merged to become the American Opera Society of Chicago. The first medal was awarded by the American Opera Society of Chicago in 1924 to Ernest Trow Carter, for his opera The White Bird, which saw its first full performance at the Studebaker Theater, in Chicago, on March 6, 1924. (The Opera in Our Language Foundation, Inc. sponsored the performance.) The last Medal for an opera was awarded around 1953 to Vittorio Giannini for The Taming of the Shrew. The award was funded in part by David Bispham's will, and also in part by Eleanor Everest Freer, who, in addition, was one of its recipients (for The Legend of the Piper). Other recipients include (alphabetically by author):

- George Antheil (for Helen Retires)
- Ernst Bacon (for A Tree on the Plains)
- Alberto Bimboni (for Winona)
- J. Lewis Browne (for The Corsican Girl (La Corsicana))
- Simon Bucharoff (for Sakhara)
- Frank Patterson (for The Echo)
- Charles Wakefield Cadman (for Shanewis)
- Charles Frederick Carlson (for Phelias)
- Ernest Trow Carter (for The White Bird)
- Rossetter Cole (for The Maypole Lovers)
- Edward Collins (for Daughters of the South)
- Frederick Shepherd Converse (for The Pipe of Desire)
- Walter Damrosch (for Cyrano)
- Francesco Bartolomeo de Leone (for Alglala)
- Henry Purmort Eames (for Priscilla and John Alden)
- Peter J. Engels (for Minnehaha)
- Ralph Errole (for Prince Elmar)
- Pietro Floridia (for Paoletta)
- Hamilton Forrest (for Yzdra)
- Aldo Franchetti (for Namiko-San)
- Eleanor Everest Freer (for Legend of the Piper)
- George Gershwin (for Porgy and Bess)
- Vittorio Giannini (for The Taming of the Shrew)
- Louis Gruenberg (for The Emperor Jones)
- Henry Hadley (for Azora, the Daughter of Montezuma)
- Richard Hageman (for Tragedy in Arezzo (Caponsacchi))
- Howard Hanson (for Merry Mount)
- W. Franke Harling (for A Light from St. Agnes)
- S. W. Harwill (for Bella Donna)
- Victor Herbert (for Natoma and Madeleine)
- John Adam Hugo (for The Temple Dancer)
- Frederick Jacobi (for The Prodigal Son)
- Wesley LaViolette (for Shylock)
- William Lester (for Manabozo)
- Clarence Loomis (for Yolanda of Cyprus)
- Otto Luening (for Evangeline)
- Ralph Lyford (for Castle Agrazant)
- Quinto Maganini (for The Argonauts)
- William J. McCoy (for Egypt)
- Gian Carlo Menotti (for The Medium and The Telephone)
- Douglas Moore (for The Devil and Daniel Webster)
- Mary Carr Moore (for "Narcissa," or The Cost of Empire)
- Marx E. Oberndorfer (for Roseanne)
- Julius Osiier (for The Bride of Baghdad)
- Frank Patterson (for The Echo)
- P. Marinus Paulsen (for The Cimbrians)
- Bernard Rogers (for The Marriage of Aude)
- Beryl Rubinstein (for The Sleeping Princess)
- Karl Schmidt (for The Lady of the Lake)
- John Laurence Seymour (for In the Pasha's Garden)
- Charles Sanford Skilton (for Kalopin)
- Theodore Stearns (for The Snow Bird)
- Humphrey John Stewart (for The Hound of Heaven)
- Albert Stoessel (for Garrick)
- Deems Taylor (for The King's Henchman)
- Virgil Thomson (for Four Saints in Three Acts)
- Jane Van Etten (for Guido Ferranti)
- Isaac Van Grove (for The Music Robber)
- Kurt Weill (for Down in the Valley)
- Clarence Cameron White (for Ouanga!)
- T. Carl Whitmer (for a selection of religious operas)
- Jean Martinon (distinguished composer and conductor)
- Sir Michael Tippet (distinguished composer and conductor)
- Alan Stout (distinguished American composer)
- Lyric Theatre (Lord Byron’s Love Letter stage sets)
- Lyric Theatre (Lyric scholarship fund)
