= Frank Porter (cricketer) =

South African cricketer (1882–1965)

Personal information
- Born: 9 April 1882; Cape Town, Cape Colony
- Died: 20 June 1965 (aged 83); Bulawayo, Rhodesia
- Source: Cricinfo, 12 December 2020

Frank Porter (9 April 1882 – 20 June 1965) was a South African cricketer. He played in eleven first-class matches from 1908/09 to 1926/27.
