= Harry J. Barnhart =

American football and basketball coach

Biographical details
- Born: September 19, 1890; Wooster, Ohio, U.S.
- Died: December 28, 1961 (aged 71); Ashland, Ohio, U.S.

Coaching career (HC unless noted)

Football
- 1915–1916: Findlay
- 1927–1931: Findlay

Basketball
- 1910–1918: Findlay
- 1927–1932: Findlay

Head coaching record
- Overall: 17–31–1 (football); 82–85 (basketball)

Harry J. Barnhart (September 19, 1890 – December 28, 1961) was an American college football and college basketball coach. He served as the head football coach at the University of Findlay in Findlay, Ohio from 1915 to 1916 and again from 1927 to 1931, compiling a record of 17–31–1. Barnhart was also the head basketball coach at Findsaly from 1910 to 1918 and 1927 to 1932, tallying a mark of 82–85.
