= Arthur Farwell =

American composer (1872–1952)

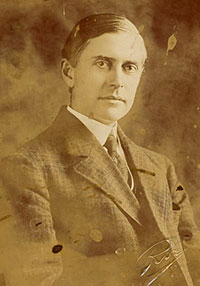
Arthur Farwell

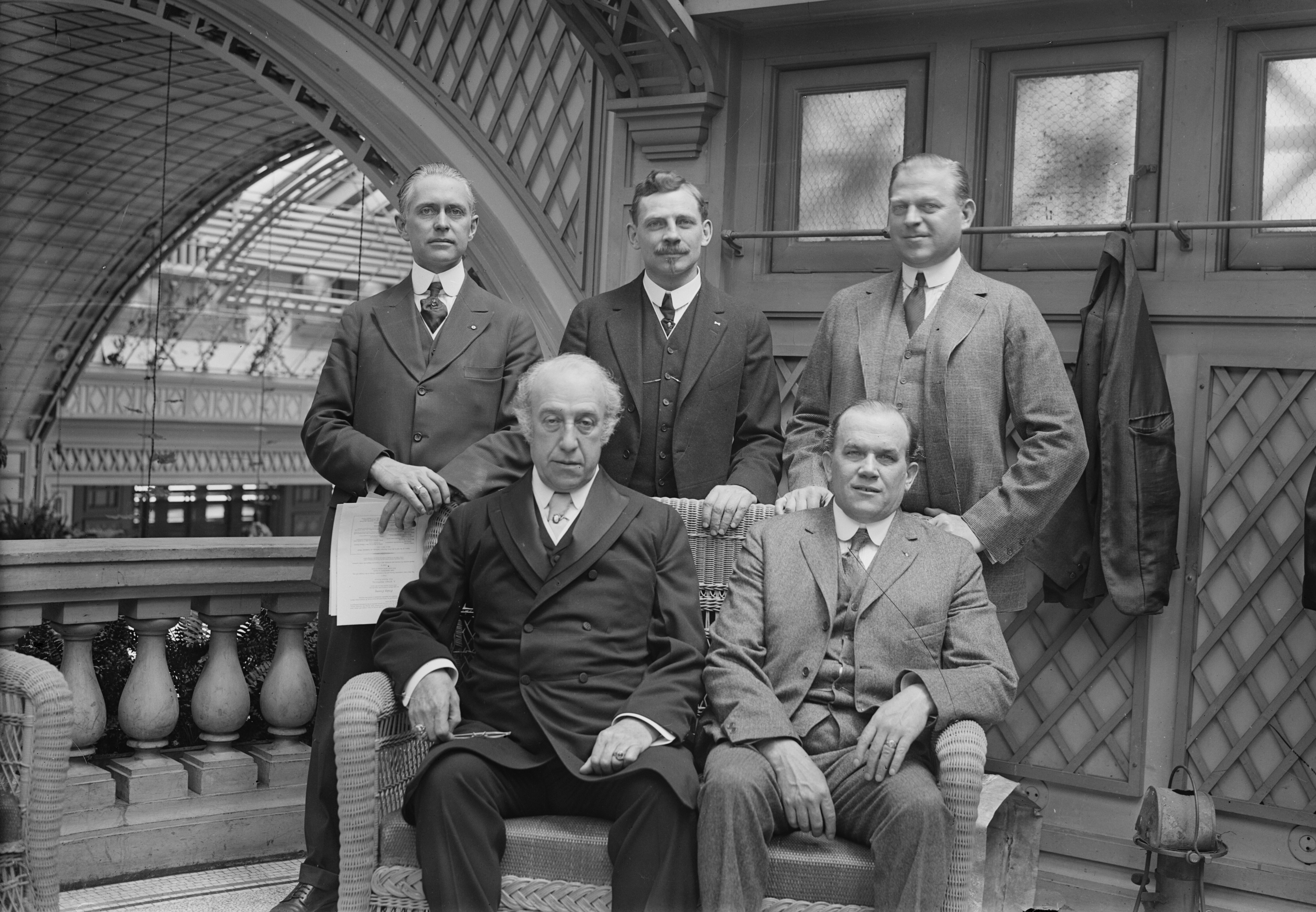
Starting left, back row: Arthur Farwell, Peter William Dykema, Walter Kirkpatrick Brice, front row, from left: John Christian Freund, and Harry Horner Barnhart in 1917 at the Community Chorus luncheon in Manhattan

Arthur Farwell (April 23, 1872 – January 20, 1952) was an American composer, conductor, educationalist, lithographer, esoteric savant, and music publisher. Interested in American Indian music, he became associated with the Indianist movement and founded the Wa-Wan Press to publish music in this genre. He combined teaching, composing and conducting in his career, working on both coasts and in Michigan.

The American composer and critic A. Walter Kramer identified Farwell as “probably the most neglected composer in our history - at the turn of the century no one wrote music with greater seriousness of purpose or fought harder for American music”.

== Biography ==
Farwell was born in St Paul, Minnesota. He trained as an engineer at Massachusetts Institute of Technology, graduating in 1893. But he turned toward a musical career following contact with Rudolf Gott, an eccentric Boston-based composer. After studying in Boston, Farwell traveled to Europe for additional work, becoming a student of Engelbert Humperdinck in Berlin and Alexandre Guilmant in Paris.

Returning to the U.S., he lectured in music at Cornell University from 1899 to 1901. He founded the Wa-Wan Press, dedicated to publishing the works of the American Indianist composers, among whom Farwell was a leading figure. There was great interest in this period in drawing from Native American forms and songs. From 1910 to 1913 Farwell directed municipal concerts in New York City, including massed performances of choral works, some of them his own, by up to 1,000 voices. He directed the Music School Settlement (now Third Street Music School Settlement) in New York from 1915 to 1918, where his private pupils included the young Roy Harris. During this period he composed the score for Percy MacKaye's "Community Masque" Caliban by the Yellow Sands.

In 1918 Farwell moved to California, assuming the role of Acting Head of the music department at the University of California, Berkeley. In 1918–19, he founded the Santa Barbara Community Chorus, and was first holder of the composer's fellowship of the Music & Art Association of Pasadena (1921–25). He moved to Michigan, where he taught theory at Michigan State College (1927–39) (now Michigan State University in East Lansing). Nicolas Slonimsky noted in Baker's Biographical Dictionary that "Disillusioned about commercial opportunities for American music, including his own, he established in East Lansing, in April 1936, his own lithographic handpress, with which he printed his own music, handling the entire process of reproduction, including the cover designs, by himself."

Farwell eventually returned to New York City, where he settled.

His notable students include Roy Harris, Dika Newlin, and Bernard Rogers.

== Music and writings ==
Farwell wrote a copious amount of instrumental, chamber, choral and orchestral music as well as theatre scores, masques and music for community performance. Some of his works reflect his interest in a personal, esoteric form of spirituality. This is also expressed in his lectures and writings on the theme of Intuition. Among his principal compositions are a number of Symbolistic Studies for orchestra, a Symphony developed from a fragmentary opening left by his mentor Rudolph Gott, the large-scale "symphonic song ceremony" Mountain Song for orchestra and chorus (after the play by Lord Dunsany), a piano quintet, and many works both vocal and instrumental drawing from the music of Native American peoples.

Farwell's String Quartet in A major, Op. 65 The Hako, composed in 1923, only received its world premiere recording in 2021, performed by the Dakota String Quartet. Curt Cacioppo calls it "the composer’s peak achievement" and "the first distinctive and confident step ever taken in American string quartet writing, unique in scope and integrative process". Without explicitly imitating indigenous musical traits the music allows "these and additional cultural aspects to guide and permeate the form on multiple levels". The work was inspired by a ceremony documented in the early 1900s by ethnographer Alice C. Fletcher.

A gradual but ceaseless developer as a composer, in his last couple of decades Farwell produced some of his most individual works - including a series of polytonal studies for piano, several concise instrumental sonatas, numerous effective and penetrating settings of the poetry of Emily Dickinson, and a satirical opera, Cartoon, which contains extended parodies of Stravinsky and Schoenberg.

== Controversy ==
Following the South Dakota Symphony's Lakota Music Project performance in 2019, a critical piece in The Washington Post led to social media portrayals of Farwell as an appropriator. The American critic and author Joseph Horowitz argues that, in the case of The Hako, Farwell "claims no authenticity. Rather, [the quartet] documents the composer’s enthralled subjective response to a gripping Native American ritual".

== Selected works ==
- The Death of Virginia, symphonic poem, Op. 4 (1894)
- American Indian Melodies, Op. 11 (1901)
- A Ruined Garden, song, Op.14 (1902)
- Dawn, Fantasy on Two Indian Themes for piano, Op. 12 (1904)
- The Domain of Hurikan for piano, Op. 15
- Navajo War Dance for piano, Op. 29 (1904)
- Impressions of the Wa-Wan Ceremony of the Omahas, Op. 21 (1905)
- From Mesa and Plain for a cappella chorus, Op. 20 (1905)
- Impressions of the Wa-Wan Ceremony of the Omahas for piano, Op. 21 (1905)
- Symbolistic Study No 3, after Walt Whitman (1905, rev. 1922)
- Three Indian Songs, Op. 32 (1908)
- The Farewell, song, Op.33 (1910)
- Pageant Scene (1913)
- The Gods of the Mountains – suite for orchestra, Op. 52 (1916)
- String Quartet, Op. 65, The Hako (1922)
- Violin Sonata (1928)
- Sourwood Mountain for piano, Op.78 (1930)
- The Vale of Enitharmon for piano, Op. 91 (1930)
- Land of Luthany for piano and cello (1931)
- Symphony Rudolf Gott, Op. 95 (1934)
- Four Indian Songs, Op. 102 (1937)
- Piano Quintet in E Minor, Op. 103 (1937)
- Polytonal Studies, Op. 109 (1940–1952)
- Cartoon, or, Once Upon a Time Recently, opera (1948).
- Emily Dickinson songs, Op. 105, Op. 108, Op. 112
- Piano Sonata, Op.113 (1949)
