= Wa-Wan Press =

- Industry: Music publishing
- Founded: 1901
- Founder: Arthur Farwell

The Wa-Wan Press was an American music publishing company founded in 1901 by composer Arthur Farwell in Newton Center, Massachusetts. The firm concentrated on publishing compositions by so-called Indianist movement members—composers who incorporated traditional Native American music into their works. Although it never achieved its founder's intentions of fomenting a classical musical revolution in the United States, the company saw success during its eleven-year history before being acquired and abandoned by G. Schirmer in 1912.

== History ==
Farwell was inspired by Antonín Dvořák's embracing of folk music; during Dvořák's 1890s stint at the National Conservatory of Music, the Czech called for American composers to develop a uniquely American style of classical music. During Farwell's own brief foray into academia at Cornell University (1899-1901), he started composing short pieces based on Native American melodies. After leaving Cornell and settling in Newton Center, he fleshed out a compilation of American Indian Melodies. His search for a publisher of the work was unsuccessful, and, as a result, he founded Wa-Wan Press in 1901. The name "Wa-Wan", which means "to sing to someone", was chosen to honor one of the traditional ceremonies of the Omaha.

The press was launched without financial backing, and operated out of the Farwell family home; its only employees were Farwell and his father, George. Its first issue in 1901 contained Farwell's American Indian Melodies and two works by Edgar Stillman Kelley. Farwell hoped that the creation of the Wa-Wan Press would hail the beginning of a classical music revolution that would rebel against what he deemed a "German domination" of the nation's music. The American public, he believed, "saw everything through German glasses", and, "a revolt against this domination was an absolute historical necessity".

For the first five years, the Wa-Wan Press published two books per quarter—one vocal and one instrumental—at an annual subscription rate of eight dollars. Subscriptions continued to grow, and in 1907, the company began printing monthly. That same year, Farwell founded the Wa-Wan Society for the "advancement of the work of American composers, and the interests of the musical life of the American people." The Wa-Wan Press later began publishing compositions in sheet music form. Farwell provided introductions, program notes, and essays to accompany the aesthetic volumes, whose covers and typographical innovations were often designed by himself. Farwell took particular pride in his work, noting later that many publishers adapted his ideas.

In 1908, the firm started losing subscriptions and ran into financial troubles. By 1912, Farwell's enthusiasm for the press had waned, and he had become chief Boston-area music critic for Musical America. He agreed to the take-over of Wa-Wan Press by G. Schirmer, which soon abandoned the project. During its 11-year history, the press had published 37 composers (nine of whom were women), including Caroline Holme Walker, Carlos Troyer, Rubin Goldmark, and Henry F. Gilbert. In 1970, Arno Press and the New York Times resurrected the press' publications by issuing a complete, five-volume reprint with Vera Brodsky Lawrence as editor.
