= Henry F. Gilbert =

American classical composer

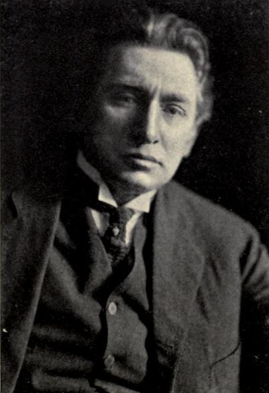
Portrait of Gilbert, ca.1915

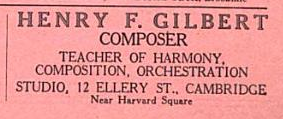
Listing for Gilbert's studio in Cambridge, Massachusetts, 1914

Henry Franklin Belknap Gilbert (September 26, 1868 – May 19, 1928) was an American composer and collector of folk songs. He is best remembered today for his interest in the music of African Americans around the turn of the 20th century.

Gilbert was born in Somerville, Massachusetts, and attended the New England Conservatory; among his teachers were Edward MacDowell, for composition, and Emil Mollenhauer, for violin. Upon graduation, Gilbert embarked upon a career in business. In 1900 he attended a performance of Gustave Charpentier's Louise which sent him back to music, and he soon became interested in American folk and popular music in particular. His Negro Episode—adapted from pieces he had heard on field trips—was performed in New York in 1896, and in 1905 he completed Americanesque, an orchestral suite based on three tunes from minstrel shows.

Gilbert's interest in folk music had led him to the music of African Americans, and it was through using black folk tunes that he gained his first major success with 1910's Comedy Overture on Negro Themes for orchestra. This was followed by the Negro Rhapsody, also for orchestra. Other subsequent pieces were based upon the music of American Indians and Creoles. Among his less popular works are Three American Dances, Two Episodes, and Riders to the Sea. Gilbert provided music for the 1922 film Down to the Sea in Ships. Though he'd originally intended to compose an entirely new score, his friend Joseph Carl Breil convinced him that's he'd be better off writing very little original music and then compiling the rest from existing works.

His greatest success was The Dance in Place Congo, a programmatic work based upon Creole themes. Originally completed in 1908, it was rejected by Karl Muck for public performance in Boston as "niggah music" and remained unperformed until recast as a 20-minute ballet and given on a triple bill by the Metropolitan Opera Company in March 1918, conducted by Pierre Monteux. It was given to acclaim at the International Festival of Contemporary Music in Frankfurt-am-Main on July 1, 1927, with the composer in attendance, though by this time Gilbert was an invalid, and died less than a year later, in Cambridge, Massachusetts. He had a congenital heart condition known as Tetralogy of Fallot, and his case was published by White and Sprague in the Journal of the American Medical Association.

Although Gilbert's music was generally well-regarded during his lifetime, his reputation has declined since his death; today, his music is little played.
