= Harry Horner Barnhart =

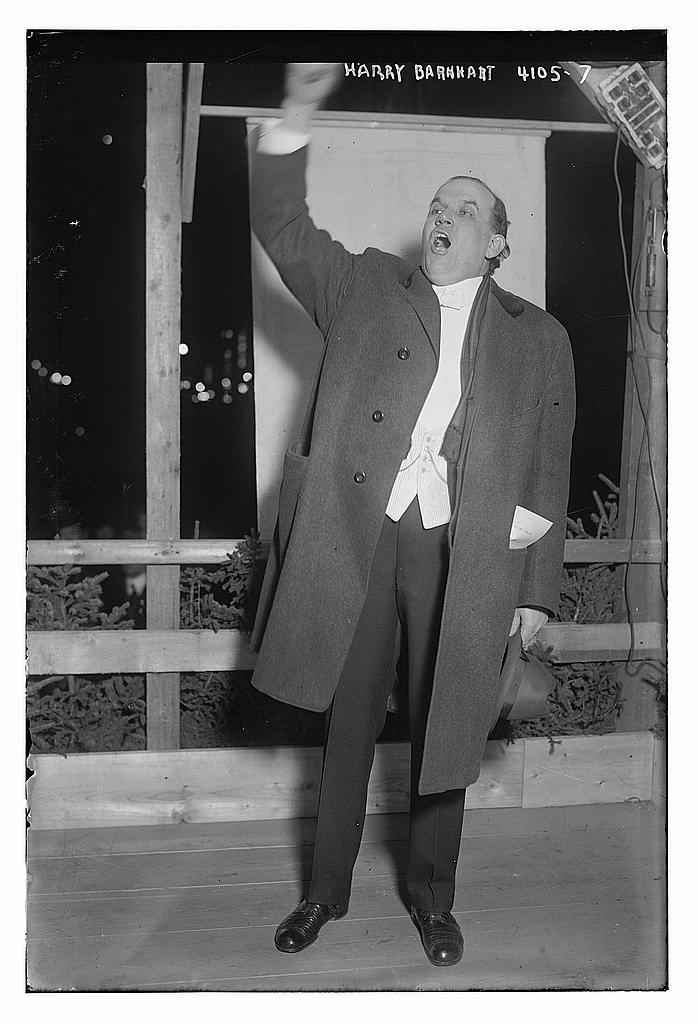

Harry Horner Barnhart (May 24, 1874 - September 3, 1948) was the conductor of the New York Community Chorus.

He was born in West Newton, Pennsylvania to Peter DeWitt Barnhart and Nancy A. Horner. He married Anna Vogan Reynolds. He died in Manhattan, in 1948.
