= Piano Concerto No. 2 (Tchaikovsky) =

Composition by Pyotr Ilyich Tchaikovsky

Piano Concerto in G major
- No. 2
- by Pyotr Ilyich Tchaikovsky
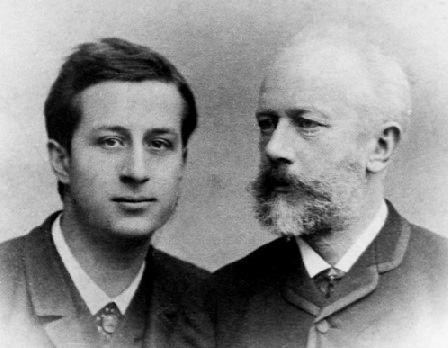
- Alexander Siloti (left), the editor, and the composer
- Opus: 44
- Composed: 1880
- Dedication: Nikolai Rubinstein
- Performed: 12 November 1881: New York City
- Movements: three

Pyotr Ilyich Tchaikovsky's Piano Concerto No. 2 in G major, Op. 44, was written in 1879–1880 and dedicated to Nikolai Rubinstein, who had insisted he perform it at the premiere as a way of making up for his harsh criticism of Tchaikovsky's First Piano Concerto. But Rubinstein never played it, as he died in March 1881, and the work has never attained much popularity.

The premiere performance took place in New York City, on 12 November 1881. The soloist was Madeline Schiller, and Theodore Thomas conducted the New York Philharmonic orchestra. The first Russian performance was in Moscow in May 1882, conducted by Anton Rubinstein with Tchaikovsky's pupil, Sergei Taneyev, at the piano.

== Structure ==
The piano concerto consists of three movements:

1. Allegro brillante e molto vivace
2. Andante non troppo (in D major)
3. Allegro con fuoco

The second movement contains prominent solos for the violin and cello, making the work in effect a concerto for piano trio and orchestra briefly, though a once-popular edition by Alexander Siloti removed large sections of the work, including those solos. Siloti initially proposed a number of changes to the score, but Tchaikovsky resisted these ideas. However, as time progressed, he agreed to certain changes. However, the version that Siloti published in 1897, four years after Tchaikovsky's death, included cuts and transpositions with which Tchaikovsky had strongly disagreed. Nevertheless, the Siloti version became the standard version for many years.

Also noteworthy is the degree of segregation of orchestra and soloist, especially in the opening movement. Tchaikovsky had told his close friend Hermann Laroche many years earlier that he would never write a piano concerto because he could not tolerate the sound of piano and orchestra playing together. Though he handled this well enough in the First Piano Concerto, he would increasingly intersperse cadenza-like passages for the soloist in the movements of his later works for piano and orchestra. For listeners trying to orient themselves through this concerto, those passages, with their abrupt switch between piano and supporting instruments, make it easier.

== Instrumentation ==
The work is scored for 2 flutes, 2 oboes, 2 clarinets in B♭ and A, 2 bassoons, 4 horns in F, 2 trumpets in D, timpani, solo piano, and strings. Notable is the absence of trombones and tuba.

== Overview ==
By 1879 the First Piano Concerto was becoming increasingly popular.

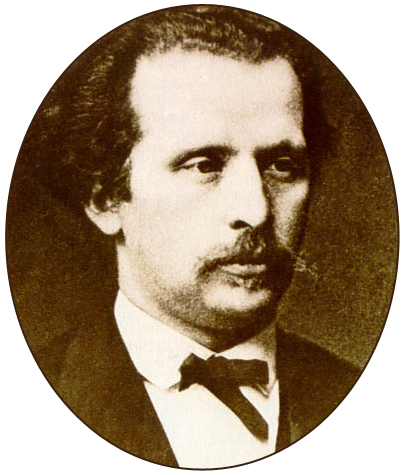
Nikolai Rubinstein

Nikolai Rubinstein had likewise made amends with the composer (after his initial harsh criticism) by learning and performing the work, which added to its popularity. Tchaikovsky felt compelled to reciprocate. He started composing a new piano concerto in October while staying with his sister in Kamenka. He wrote to his patroness, Nadezhda von Meck, "I want to dedicate it [the new work] to N. G. Rubinstein in recognition of his magnificent playing of my First Concerto and of my Sonata, which left me in utter rapture after he performed it for me in Moscow."

The writing went quickly. By the following March, Tchaikovsky had completed the concerto and orchestrated it. Still, he was concerned about Rubinstein's reaction, writing again to von Meck, "I tremble at the thought of the criticisms I may again hear from Nikolai Grigoryevich, to whom this concerto is dedicated. Still, even if once more he does criticise yet nevertheless goes on to perform it brilliantly as with the First Concerto, I won't mind. It would be nice, though, if on this occasion the period between the criticism and the performance were shorter. In the meantime I am very pleased and self-satisfied about this concerto, but what lies ahead—I cannot say."

The composer need not have worried. Rubinstein's reaction was this time understandably cautious. He suggested tactfully that perhaps the solo part was episodic, too much engaged in dialogue with the orchestra rather than standing in the foreground, but adding, "... as I say all this, having scarcely played the concerto once through, perhaps I am wrong." Tchaikovsky rejected Rubinstein's criticism, but without any rancour whatsoever. In fact, when Tchaikovsky received news of Rubinstein's death in March 1881, he was devastated and left immediately from Paris to attend the funeral. The first Russian performance was entrusted to Tchaikovsky's friend and former pupil Sergei Taneyev, but the concerto had its world premiere in November 1881 in New York City, with the pianist Madeline Schiller.

There is a notable link between the coda of this concerto and the coda of his First Piano Concerto.

== Performance history ==
A list of performances of Tchaikovsky's second piano concerto, excluding the American and Russian premieres.

- Manchester, Great Britain: 28 October 1886, conducted and played by Charles Hallé
- Saint Petersburg, Russian Empire: 17 November 1888, conducted by Tchaikovsky, played by Wassily Sapellnikoff
- Prague, Austria-Hungary: 30 November 1888, conducted by Tchaikovsky, played by Wassily Sapellnikoff
- Moscow, Russian Empire: 22 December 1888, conducted by Tchaikovsky, played by Wassily Sapellnikoff
- London, Great Britain: 26 April 1890, conducted by August Manns, played by Wassily Sapellnikoff
- Kiev, Russian Empire: 17 December 1890, conducted by Wilhelm Harteveld and played by N. A. Listovnichy
- Paris, France: 5 April 1891, conducted by Tchaikovsky, played by Wassily Sapellnikoff

== Other uses ==
George Balanchine set his ballet Ballet Imperial to this score in 1941, and it remains in the active repertoire of many companies under the revised title Tschaikovsky Piano Concerto No. 2.

== Bibliography ==
- Brown, David, Tchaikovsky: The Man and His Music (New York: Pegasus Books, 2007). ISBN 978-1-933648-30-9.
- Warrack, John, Tchaikovsky Symphonies and Concertos (Seattle: University of Washington Press, 1969)
