= One of Cleopatra's Nights and Other Fantastic Romances =

1882 collection of short stories by Théophile Gautier

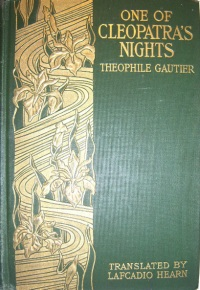
- Cover of the 1900 Brentano's edition
- Author: Théophile Gautier
- Translator: Lafcadio Hearn
- Genre: Fantasy, historical fiction, short stories
- Publisher: Richard Worthington
- Publication date: 1882
- Publication place: United States
- Media type: Print (hardcover)
- Pages: ix, 321 pp

One of Cleopatra's Nights and Other Fantastic Romances is a collection of fantasy short stories by Théophile Gautier, selected from his Nouvelles and Romans et Contes and translated from the French by Lafcadio Hearn. The translation was Hearn's first book, and is considered one of the best English translations of Gautier. It was first published in hardcover by Richard Worthington in 1882, and reprinted in 1886, 1888, 1890 and 1891; later reprint editions were issued by H. W. Hagemann (1894) and Brentano's in 1899, 1900, 1906, 1910, 1915, and 1927. The first British edition was published by MacLaren and Co. in 1907. The work was reprinted in 1999 by Wildside Press, a trade paperback edition with page count matching the original.

Lin Carter considered reissuing the collection as a volume in the Ballantine Adult Fantasy series, but this project was not realized.

Copyright for the work has expired, so it now resides in the public domain. The text in various editions is available via Project Gutenberg, Internet Archive, HathiTrust, or Google Books.

== Contents ==
- "To the Reader" (Lafcadio Hearn)
- "One of Cleopatra's Nights" (Une nuit de Cléopâtre, 1838)
- "Clarimonde" (La morte amoureuse, 1836)
- " Arria Marcella" (1852)
- "The Mummy's Foot" (Le Pied de momie, 1840)
- "Omphale: A Rococo Story" (Omphale, 1845)
- "King Candaules" (Le Roi Candaule, 1844)
- "Addenda" (Lafcadio Hearn)

== Reception ==
In his introduction to the collection, translator Lafcadio Hearn wrote that the stories "afford in the original many excellent examples of that peculiar beauty of fancy and power of painting with words which made Gautier the most brilliant literary artist of his time," and asserted, "At least three of the stories we have attempted to translate rank among the most remarkable literary productions of the century" (though he did not specify which three).

E. F. Bleiler praised the collection for possessing the "glamour and fascination of the past, told with a fine mixture of sentimentality and horror."

In his "Memorial Verses on the Death of Théophile Gautier", Swinburne referenced "One of Cleopatra's Nights":

And that great night of love more strange than this,
When she that made the whole world's bale and bliss
Made king of all the world's desire a slave,
And killed him in mid kingdom with a kiss…

In the same poem, Swinburne also referenced "Clarimonde":

The love that caught strange light from death's own eyes,
And filled death's lips with fiery words and sighs,
And half asleep let feed from veins of his
Her close red warm snake's mouth, Egyptian-wise…

== Adaptations ==
=== Operas ===
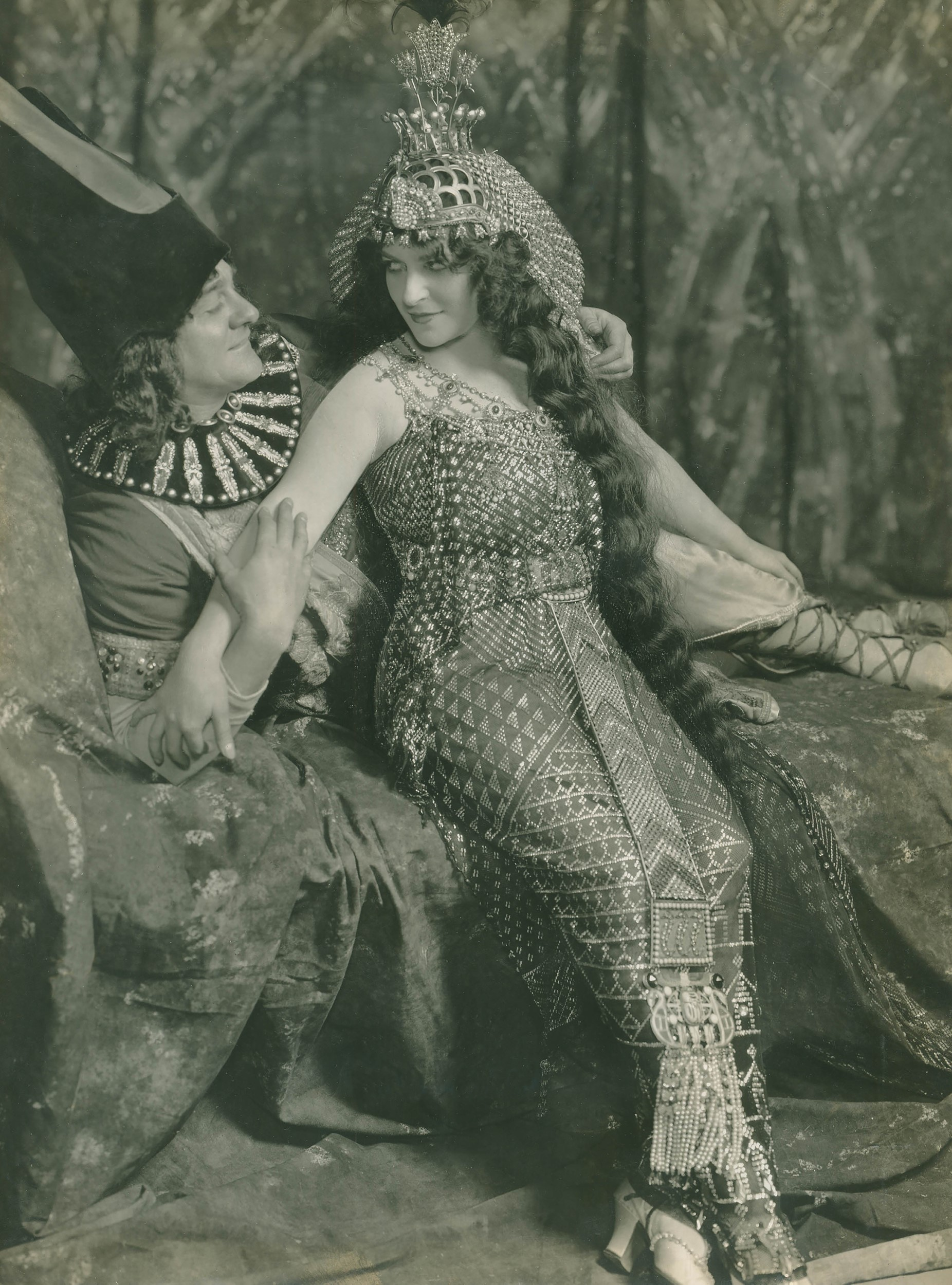
Orville Harrold and Frances Alda in the opera Cleopatra's Night.

Une nuit de Cléopâtre, an opera in three acts by Victor Massé with a libretto by Jules Barbier based on "One of Cleopatra's Nights," premiered in 1885. The opera is referenced, unfavorably, in Proust's Swann's Way (1913).

Cleopatra's Night, a short opera in two acts by American composer Henry Kimball Hadley with a libretto by Alice Leal Pollock based on "One of Cleopatra's Nights," premiered at the Metropolitan Opera on January 31, 1920. The opera was revived the following season, and was broadcast on NBC radio in 1929. Henry T. Finck proclaimed it the best of ten American operas that had so far appeared at the Met.

=== Television ===
"The Mummy's Foot" was adapted as part of the NBC Television anthology series Your Show Time, airing February 11, 1949. "One of Cleopatra's Nights" was adapted as part of the Spanish anthology series Hora once, airing June 17, 1971. "Omphale: A Rococo Story" was adapted as part of the French anthology series Softly from Paris, airing May 20, 1988. "Clarimonde" was adapted as part of the anthology series The Hunger, airing March 20, 1998.
