= Inez Barbour Hadley =

American singer

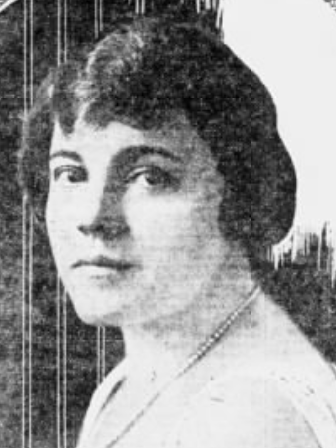
- Inez Barbour Hadley, from a 1925 newspaper
- Born: Inez Barber; September 23, 1879; Bradford, Pennsylvania
- Died: January 8, 1971 (aged 91); New York City
- Occupations: Singer, philanthropist
- Known for: President of the National Association of American Composers and Conductors
- Spouse: Henry Kimball Hadley

Inez Barbour Hadley (September 23, 1879 – January 8, 1971) was an American soprano. Though she was neither a composer nor a conductor, she was president of the National Association of American Composers and Conductors from 1937 to 1971.

== Early life ==
Inez Barber (or Barbour) was born in Bradford, Pennsylvania, the daughter of Jeremiah Barber and Catherine Bright Barber. She trained as a singer in Europe.

== Career ==
Inez Barbour was a lyric soprano, usually heard in concerts and recitals. A 1913 reviewer described her as "a splendid looking woman of appealing charm, of warm temperament, of perfect poise and above all of glorious voice." A 1915 newspaper reported that she was "one of the highest priced oratorio singers in the country". In 1916, she was soprano soloist at the American premiere of Mahler's Symphony No. 8, conducted by Leopold Stokowski. She sang with the Tokyo Symphony in 1930. She also spoke to community groups on musical subjects.

Hadley married a composer, Henry Kimball Hadley, whose songs she often performed. He founded the National Association of American Composers and Conductors in 1933; after her husband's death in 1937, she took over the organization, and was its leader for over thirty years. In 1938 she went to Finland to meet with Jean Sibelius. In 1944, she launched the SS Henry Hadley, a supply ship used in World War II. She was awarded the association's Henry Hadley Medal in 1963, and she founded the Henry Hadley Memorial Library at Lincoln Center.

Barbour made dozens of recordings. They included lateral cut releases on the Victor label from 1910 to 1913, the Columbia label from 1910 to 1917, the Zonophone label in 1911, and the Okeh and Brunswick labels in 1917 and 1918. She also released vertical cut recordings, at least two sides on the Phono-Cut label, and one side, containing her husband Henry Hadley's "Make Me a Song," on Rishell. In the latter, she is likely accompanied by her husband and his brother Arthur, as the uncredited accompaniment is by piano and cello, and they are credited as pianist and cellist, respectively, in the recording of Hadley's "Elegie" overside.

== Personal life and legacy ==
In 1918, Inez Barbour married conductor and composer Henry Kimball Hadley. He died in 1937. She died in 1971, at a hospital in New York City. A few years after her death, the National Association of Composers and Conductors was renamed the National Association of Composers, USA (NACUSA), and its headquarters were moved to Los Angeles. The Newberry Library has a collection of Barbour and Hadley's programs and posters.
