= One of Cleopatra's Nights =

- Short story by Théophile Gautier
- Original title: Une nuit de Cléopâtre
- Translator: Lafcadio Hearn
- Country: France
- Language: French
- Genre: Historical fiction

Publication
- Published in: La Presse
- Publication type: periodical
- Publication date: November 29-December 6 1838
- Published in English: 1882

One of Cleopatra's Nights (French: Une nuit de Cléopâtre) is a historical short story by the French writer Théophile Gautier, first published as a six-part serial from November 29-December 6 1838 in La Presse. It relates an imagined romantic incident in the life of the Ptolemaic queen of Egypt, Cleopatra VII. The story was translated into English together with other fantastic tales of Gautier by Lafcadio Hearn for the collection One of Cleopatra's Nights and Other Fantastic Romances, published by Richard Worthington in 1882.

== Summary ==
Cleopatra crosses the Nile to her summer palace in her royal cangia (sailboat). She confesses to her slave Charmion to a horrible ennui. She is oppressed by the thought of the Egypt she rules and all its ancient, preserved dead; only love can redeem it for her.

Later Meïamoun, a hopeless admirer of the queen who has intrigued her with an arrow-borne declaration of love, is caught spying on her in the bath. In an act of capricious leniency, Cleopatra treats him to one night of love, hosting an orgiastic banquet in his company and even dancing before him. With the morning comes a cup of poison, which he willingly takes to drink. She stays his hand, only to be distracted by a clarion heralding the arrival of Mark Antony.

At this signal Meïamoun says "You see the moment has come: it is daybreak; it is the hour when happy dreams take flight." He drinks and falls dead, and Cleopatra lets fall a single teardrop, the only one she has ever shed.

Antony arrives and asks meaning of the corpse; it is only a poison she was testing, she tells him, and bids him sit beside her to watch the dancers.

== In other media ==
The story is the basis of the short two-act opera Cleopatra's Night by American composer Henry Kimball Hadley, with libretto by Alice Leal Pollock, that premiered at the Metropolitan Opera on January 31, 1920.
