= Cleopatra's Night =

- Opera by Henry Kimball
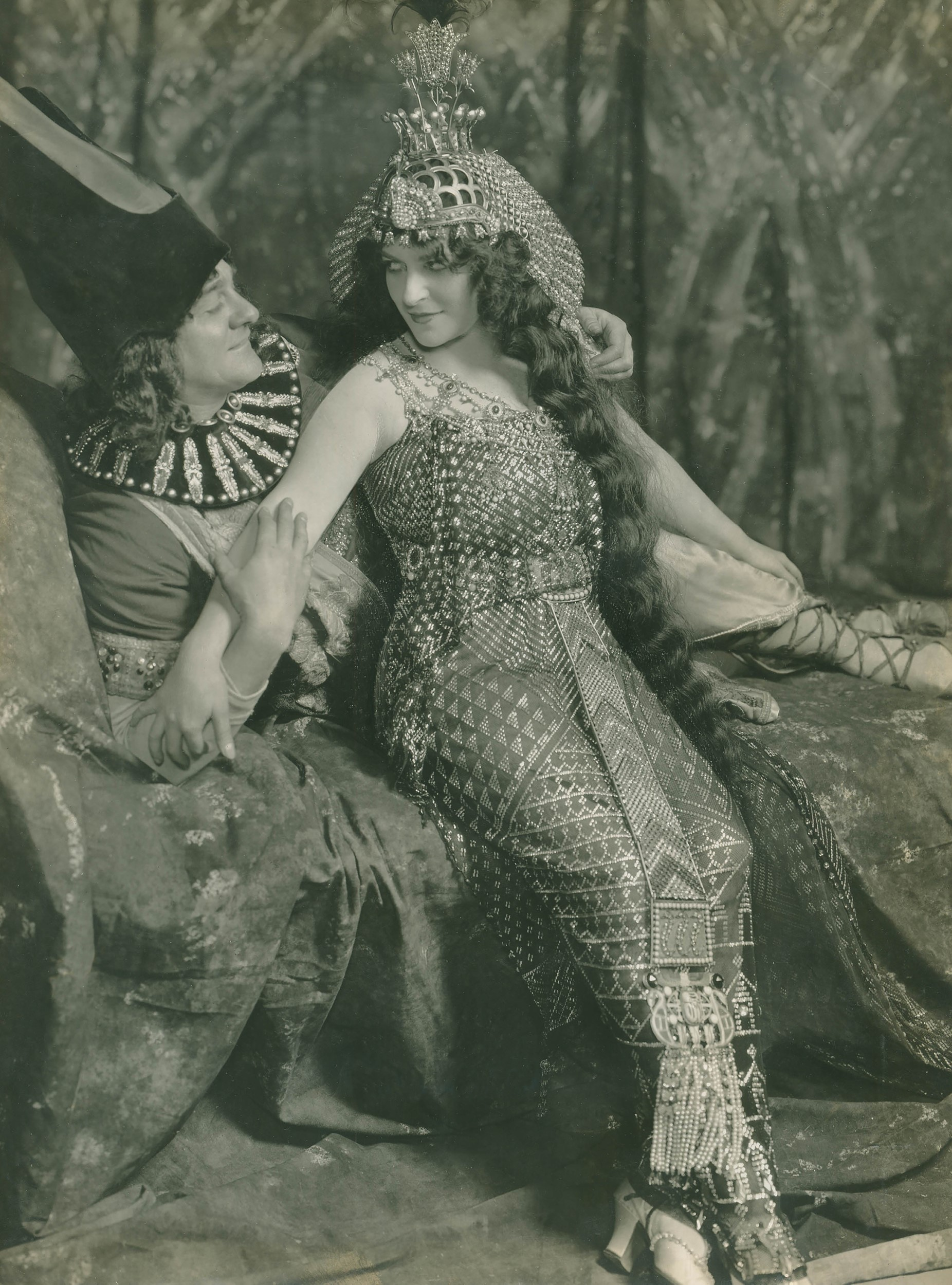
- Orville Harrold and Frances Alda in a scene from Cleopatra's Night
- Librettist: Alice Leal Pollock
- Language: Italian
- Based on: "One of Cleopatra's Nights" by Théophile Gautier
- Premiere: 31 January 1920; Metropolitan Opera House, New York City

Cleopatra's Night is a short opera in two acts by American composer Henry Kimball Hadley. Its libretto is by Alice Leal Pollock based on the 1838 short story "One of Cleopatra's Nights" by French author Théophile Gautier. The opera premiered at the Metropolitan Opera on January 31, 1920. The opera was revived the following season, and was broadcast on NBC radio in 1929.

Cleopatra's Night is written in an eclectic late romantic style, influenced both by the dramatic lyricism of the verismo movement and the rich orchestral approach employed by Wagner and Richard Strauss.

The opera's first production was designed by Norman Bel Geddes. Frances Alda sang the title role, while tenor Orville Harrold sang the role of Meïamoun. Gennaro Papi conducted the premiere, though Hadley took the baton for the sixth and final performance of the season, becoming the first American composer to conduct his own opera at the Met. The opera was brought back the following season for three further performances. Critical reception was generally good, with Henry T. Finck proclaiming it the best of ten American operas that had so far appeared at the Met.

== Roles ==
Role	Voice type	Premiere cast, 31 January 1920 (Conductor: Gennaro Papi)
Cleopatra, Queen of Egypt	soprano	Frances Alda
Meïamoun, A Young Egyptian	tenor	Orville Harrold
Mark Antony	baritone	Vincenzo Reschiglian
Mardion, favored maid to the Queen	mezzo-soprano	Jeanne Gordon
Iras, a maiden	mezzo-soprano	Marie Tiffany
A Eunuch	baritone	Millo Picco
Antony's Chief Officer	baritone	Louis D'Angelo
A Guest	tenor	
A Hungry Guest	bass	
A Female Guest	mezzo-soprano	
Diomedes, Chief of Cleopatra's rowers	spoken	
The Distiller of Poisons	spoken	

== Plot ==
The first act opens beside Cleopatra's bath in a spacious garden near the Nile river. As the curtain rises, distant Egyptians are heard chanting a prayer for rain. Cleopatra's favored maids Iras and Mardion enter. Iras notes that Mardion is very pale. Mardion admits that she is hopelessly in love with Meïamoun, a lion hunter, but that he pays her no heed. A Eunuch enters, announcing that Cleopatra is approaching in her cangia, and would bathe before sunset. But he warns them of the queen's mood. Maidens and eunuchs prepare her bath with perfumed water and flower petals. Cleopatra's boat arrives, and the queen disembarks, and in her aria "My veins seem filled with flowing quicksilver..." she complains bitterly of the heat. Even the night gives her no comfort, for she cannot forget the host of mummies buried beneath the Egyptian sands. She cries to the gods to give her something radiantly new and different from her monotonous existence. At that very moment an arrow buries itself in the dust at the queen's feet. She swears that whoever shot that arrow would pay for his offense. But then she notices a papyrus wound around the arrow's shaft. She demands that Mardion give it to her. On it is written the words, "I love you." She spots a distant figure swimming in the Nile, and demands that he be brought before her alive. In her aria "I love you, I love you..." Cleopatra thanks the gods for answering her prayer. The queen disrobes and is entering the bath when suddenly Meïamoun emerges from the water of the pool. Eunuchs rush forward, ready to kill the intruder, but Cleopatra stops them. Meïamoun does not cower in fear, but, when questioned explains with the words "I love you", and then embarks on a passionate poetic aria proclaiming his obsession with the queen. "We have breathed the same air," he concludes. "Now I can die." Cleopatra refuses to kill him, but rather offers a bargain. Would he trade his life for one night with her? She warns him that when dawn comes, she would have no pity. Mardion begs him not to sully himself, and admits that she loves him. He states that he does not know her, and when he accepts the queen's bargain, the maid grabs a dagger and stabs herself. Cleopatra orders that her body be thrown to the crocodiles. She only wishes to go to the palace with Meïamoun. Leaning on his arm, she re-enters the cangia, and it slips away into the twilight as her attendants softly chant praises to their queen.

After a brief intermezzo, the second act opens on the terraces of Cleopatra's palace just before dawn. A banquet is being held, and the guests comment that no man has kept Cleopatra from her banquet, not even Mark Antony. Soon Cleopatra and Meïamoun emerge from the palace, the hunter clothed in a starry cloak. Cleopatra seats herself on her throne, and Meïamoun sits at her feet. The queen urges her love to sit beside her, but requests that he stop looking at her, for she swoons before his gaze. Rather she commands Greek maidens to dance. Despite being offered many delicacies, Meïamoun refuses to eat. Cleopatra summons her desert girls to dance for him and they dance until, too exhausted to resist, they are carried off by some of the guests. Cleopatra urges Meïamoun to repeat those words to her that first won her heart. He sings an earnest, impassioned declaration of his love. The first light begins to glow in the East. Cleopatra urges him to flee with her to a nearby white temple, where they may ignore the dawn, but Meïamoun points out that there is not enough time. Cleopatra commands that the canopies be drawn. She will blot out day for an entire month, that he may continue to love her. She offers him any gift, but he only requests that she, when he is dead, will press his earthly shell to her heart as she does now, and that she will sometimes think of him in the still hours of the night. She agrees. As dawn arrives, the distiller of poisons enters, and offers to Meïamoun a vaporous cup. Saluting the gods, he raises it to his lips. Cleopatra grabs his arm, commanding that he live in order to love her. But just at that moment Iras rushes in to announce Antony's horn. Meïamoun quickly drinks the cup, and falls dead at Cleopatra's feet. Cleopatra claps her hands, and eunuchs enter to cover Meïamoun's body with silken cloths. Antony's chief officer enters, and Cleopatra tells him to go to Antony and tell him that she eagerly awaits him. When Antony's men leave, she gently uncovers Meïamoun's body, and holding it to her heart in broken tones she tells him that she keeps her promise. Antony's voice is heard, and as distant chanting for rain is heard as in the beginning, she kisses Meïamoun's lifeless lips, and ascends the steps into the palace as her eunuchs again cover her lover's body.

== Sources ==
- "Henry Kimball Hadley" (in German). operone.de.
