= Gertrude Robinson Smith =

American arts patron and philanthropist (1881–1963)

- Born: Gertrude Robinson Smith; July 13, 1881; New York City
- Died: October 22, 1963 (aged 82); New York City
- Occupations: Arts patron, philanthropist
- Known for: a founder of the Berkshire Symphonic Festival now known as Tanglewood

Gertrude Robinson Smith (July 13, 1881 – October 22, 1963) was an arts patron, philanthropist and a founder of the Berkshire Symphonic Festival, which came to be known as Tanglewood. At the height of the Great Depression, Smith gathered the human resources and secured the financial backing that supported the festival's early success. Her leadership from the first concerts in August 1934 through the mid-1950s has been recognized as foundational to assuring the success of one of the world's most celebrated seasonal music festivals.

== Early life ==
Smith was the daughter of Charles Robinson Smith and Jeannie Porter Steele. She was born in New York City on July 13, 1881. Her father was a prosperous corporate lawyer and director of Allied Chemical. Her father was an active member of the New York Bar Association and was active in helping to write what is today's corporate law. After World War I, Charles Robinson Smith wrote many articles advocating the forgiveness of war debts for which he received the French Legion of Honor. Other material relates primarily to United States Tax laws. Her mother was the child of wealthy American parents and raised primarily in Paris. She had two siblings, sisters Elsa, who died in childhood, and Hilda, who married Lyman Beecher Stowe, the grandson of Harriet Beecher Stowe. Gertrude's childhood was spent largely between New York City and Paris.

== Life in the Berkshires ==
As World War I raged in Europe, the Smith family moved their summer vacations from France to the Berkshire Hills of western Massachusetts. During the Gilded Age, the region had been highly favored by families of prominence and wealth. The Great Depression had taken its toll on the Berkshire's summer colony, but it was still popular with families whose fortunes were intact. Her father purchased an estate in the Glendale section of Stockbridge near Chesterwood, the home of his friend sculptor Daniel Chester French.

By now in her mid-thirties, Smith would not sit out the War in the safety of her family's new estate. She and Edith Wharton joined forces to organize medical supplies for the troops in France. Traveling to Europe in a blacked-out ship, she flew over the front lines to help deliver the supplies. She also took some of the first aerial photographs of active combat which were published by the New York Times and New York Herald Tribune. In recognition of her fundraising to buy Ice Trucks to deliver blood to wounded soldiers, Smith was made a chevalier of the French Legion of Honor. In 1919 with the help of her friend Miriam Oliver and a few local artisans, Smith constructed her own residence on the family's Stockbridge property. With her cultured background and formidable presence, she became a well known personality among the region's rich and famous summer residents.

== First concert season ==
In the spring of 1934 Smith was approached by Henry Kimball Hadley, a composer and the Associate Conductor of the New York Philharmonic Orchestra. While he was in the Berkshires seeking support for his dream of creating a summer classical music concert series, fortune smiled when he was referred to Smith. Her passionate appreciation of classical music, confident take charge reputation and circle of wealthy friends quickly led to a brief inaugural series of concerts that summer. Berkshire historian Carole Owens recounts Smith's ready response to the challenge, "Robinson Smith, a woman of girth, guts and money, seemingly without pausing for breath, set about launching a cultural institution in a midst of a depression. She did it in three months. In August 1934 the first outdoor concerts called the Berkshire Symphonic Festival took place." These first concerts were held in the Interlaken neighborhood of Stockbridge on the grounds of an estate owned by Daniel Hanna, son of Cleveland industrialist Mark Hanna.

== Tanglewood ==
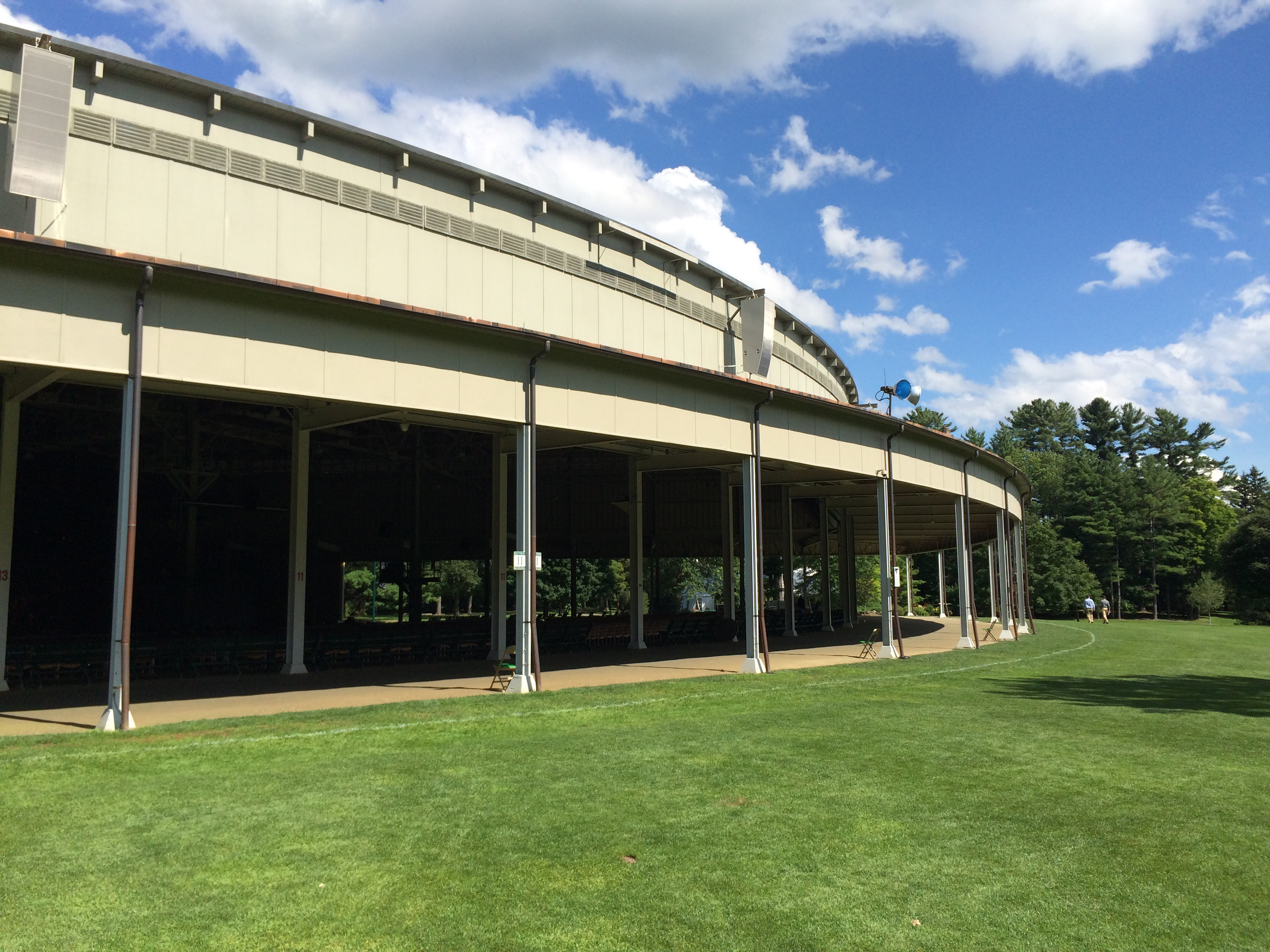
The Koussevitzky Music Shed, designed by Eliel Saarinen and opened in 1938.

Following the initial success of the 1934 and 1935 summer concerts, Smith and Hadley began to plan for an annual seasonal festival. In 1936 the venue moved to Holmwood, the home of Margaret Vanderbilt in nearby Lenox. That season saw the Boston Symphony Orchestra (BSO) replace the New York Philharmonic Orchestra as the festival's crown jewel. Under the direction of Serge Koussevitzky the BSO gave its first concert in the Berkshires on August 13, 1936. In 1937 the site changed to "Tanglewood", an estate donated by Mrs. Gorham Brooks and Miss Mary Aspinwall Tappan. "Tanglewood" took its name from Tanglewood Tales, written by Nathaniel Hawthorne, while he lived in a cottage located on the estate.

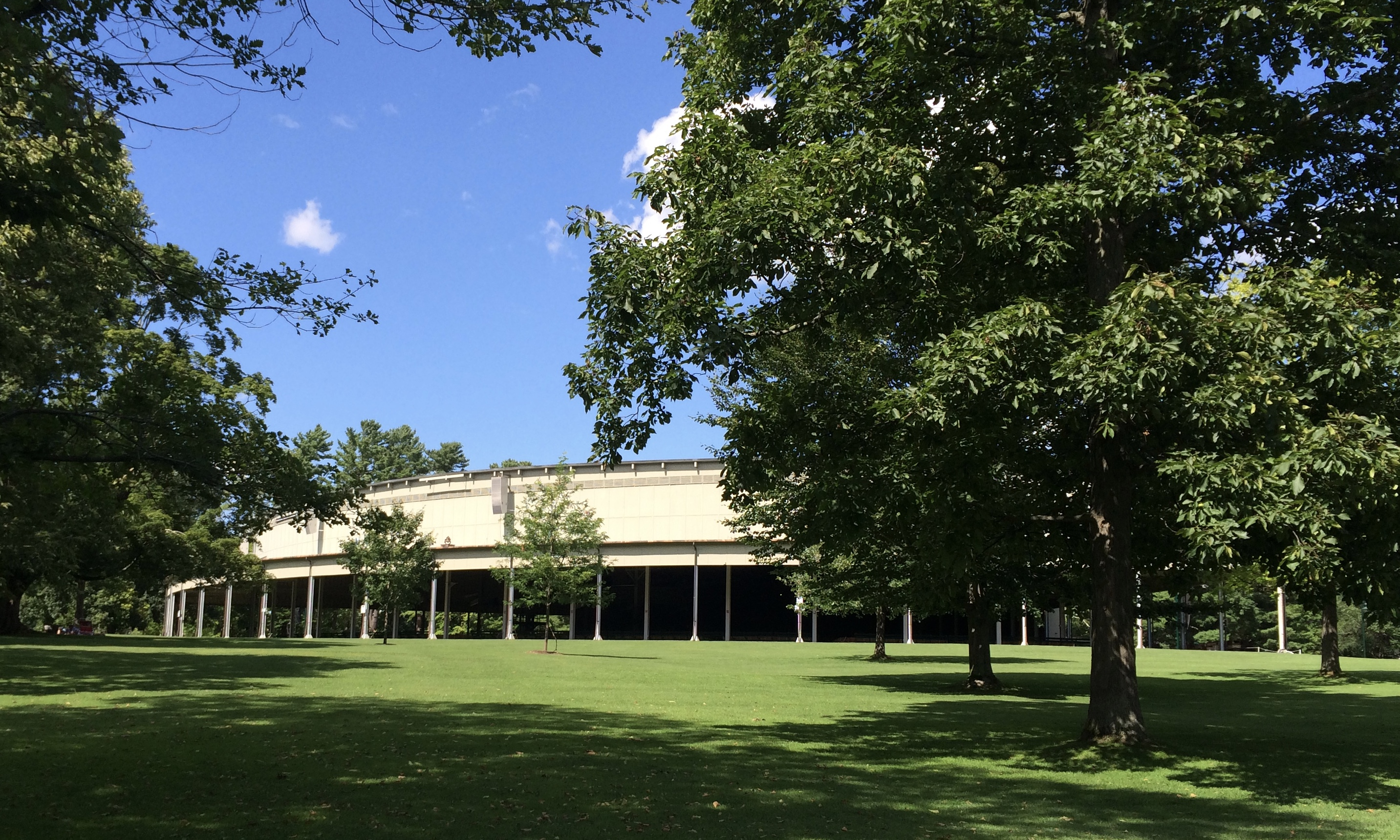
The Koussevitzky Music Shed and grounds at Tanglewood.

In 1937 a powerful summer storm gave Smith the opportunity to transform a drenching rain into a triumph the following summer. Her take charge determination took center stage as recalled in a 1990 Berkshire Magazine article titled “Madame Chairman”: A now infamous episode revealing Robinson Smith’s strength of character occurred on the night of August 12, 1937, when a thunderstorm stopped the festival performance of Wagner’s "Ride of the Valkyries". A "Boston Globe" article recounts how Robinson Smith strode purposefully to the stage when the concert stopped and addressed the record crowd of 5,000, haranguing: “Now do you see why we must have a permanent building for these concerts?” In minutes, more than $30,000 was raised.

The thunderstorm and Smith's dramatic appeal helped secure the funds so that the Eliel Saarinen designed Music Shed opened the following season on August 4, 1938. Smith's speech at the dedication was recorded and archived, so can still he heard. Nearly eighty years later, the venerable Koussevitzky Music Shed continues to serve as Tanglewood's main stage.

== Legacy ==
Gertrude Robinson Smith's work helped to create and lead Tanglewood through the success of its early years. Efforts by Smith and her cadre of wealthy patrons and music lovers were essential to the development of what has become a multi-faceted festival of performance and musician training. Writing in the August 27, 2012, edition of the New Yorker Magazine on the occasion of Tanglewood's seventy-fifth anniversary, Alex Ross recalls a pivotal moment Tanglewood emerged from the Berkshire Symphonic Festival, which originally offered the New York Philharmonic as its main attraction. Gertrude Robinson Smith, a formidable local philanthropist who campaigned for women’s welfare and reportedly threw a mean curveball, was the festival’s leading patron, and when the Philharmonic lost interest Smith turned instead to Koussevitzky, who seized on her notion that the enterprise could become an American version of the Salzburg Festival.

Smith died on October 22, 1963, in New York City at New York Hospital. She had suffered a stroke a month earlier.
