= Safié =

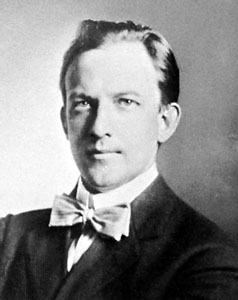
Henry Kimball Hadley

Safié is a one act opera by American composer Henry Kimball Hadley. The opera's libretto was written in English by Edward Oxenford, but its premiere, on April 4, 1909, in Mainz, Germany, was given in a German translation by Otto Neitzel. Hadley conducted the premiere, and the title role was sung by American soprano Marguerite Lemon.

Safié's full score, in manuscript, is in the collection of the New York Public Library for the Performing Arts, part of the Lincoln Center complex in Manhattan.

== Roles ==
Role	Voice type	Premiere Cast, 4 April 1909 (Conductor: Henry Hadley)
Safié, a Persian princess	Soprano	Margaret Lemon
Ahmed, an envoy	Tenor	Konrad Rössner
Alasman, a magician	Baritone	Fritz Rupp
Zehu, his son	Bass	Karl Bara
Mahud Khan, a Persian nobleman, Safié's uncle	Bass	Jean Hemfing

== Synopsis ==
Safié, a Persian princess, loves an envoy named Ahmed. When Ahmed is sent on a diplomatic mission to a distant country, he promises to send Safié a rose once a week as a token of his devotion. But Zehu, the son of a famous magician, also desires Safié. While Ahmed is away, Zehu tries to force his affection on the princess, who is saved by her uncle. Infuriated, Zehu plots revenge. He sends a poisoned bracelet to Safié, who, not knowing its origin, wears it and becomes ill. She succumbs to the poison just as Ahmed's first rose arrives, and she dies with her lover's name on her lips.
