= Gennaro Papi =

Italian conductor (1886–1941)

- Born: December 21, 1886; Naples, Italy
- Died: November 29, 1941 (aged 54); New York, New York, US
- Occupation: Conductor

Gennaro Papi (December 21, 1886 – November 29, 1941) was an Italian operatic conductor known for his work with the Metropolitan Opera and Chicago Civic Opera companies.

== Biography ==
Gennaro Papi was born in Naples on December 21, 1886. He studied at the conservatory in that city, holding various posts as conductor and choirmaster after his graduation. He immigrated to the United States in 1913 and became assistant to Arturo Toscanini, principal conductor of the Metropolitan Opera in New York City. When Toscanini resigned from the Met rather abruptly in 1915, Papi replaced him as chief conductor. He made his debut in that position on November 16, 1916, conducting Puccini's Manon Lescaut with Enrico Caruso and Frances Alda, heading the cast. Papi left the Met in 1927 to become the main conductor of the Chicago Civic Opera, but returned to his former post in 1935.

On the morning of November 29, 1941, Papi was found dead in his apartment just a few hours before he was to conduct a Saturday matinee performance of La traviata at the Metropolitan. The performance, which was broadcast over the radio by NBC, marked the Met debut of tenor Jan Peerce. Ettore Panizza conducted the performance. Although news of Papi's death was intended to be withheld from the company until after the performance ended, nearly the entire house knew by the end of the first act.
