= Madeleine (opera) =

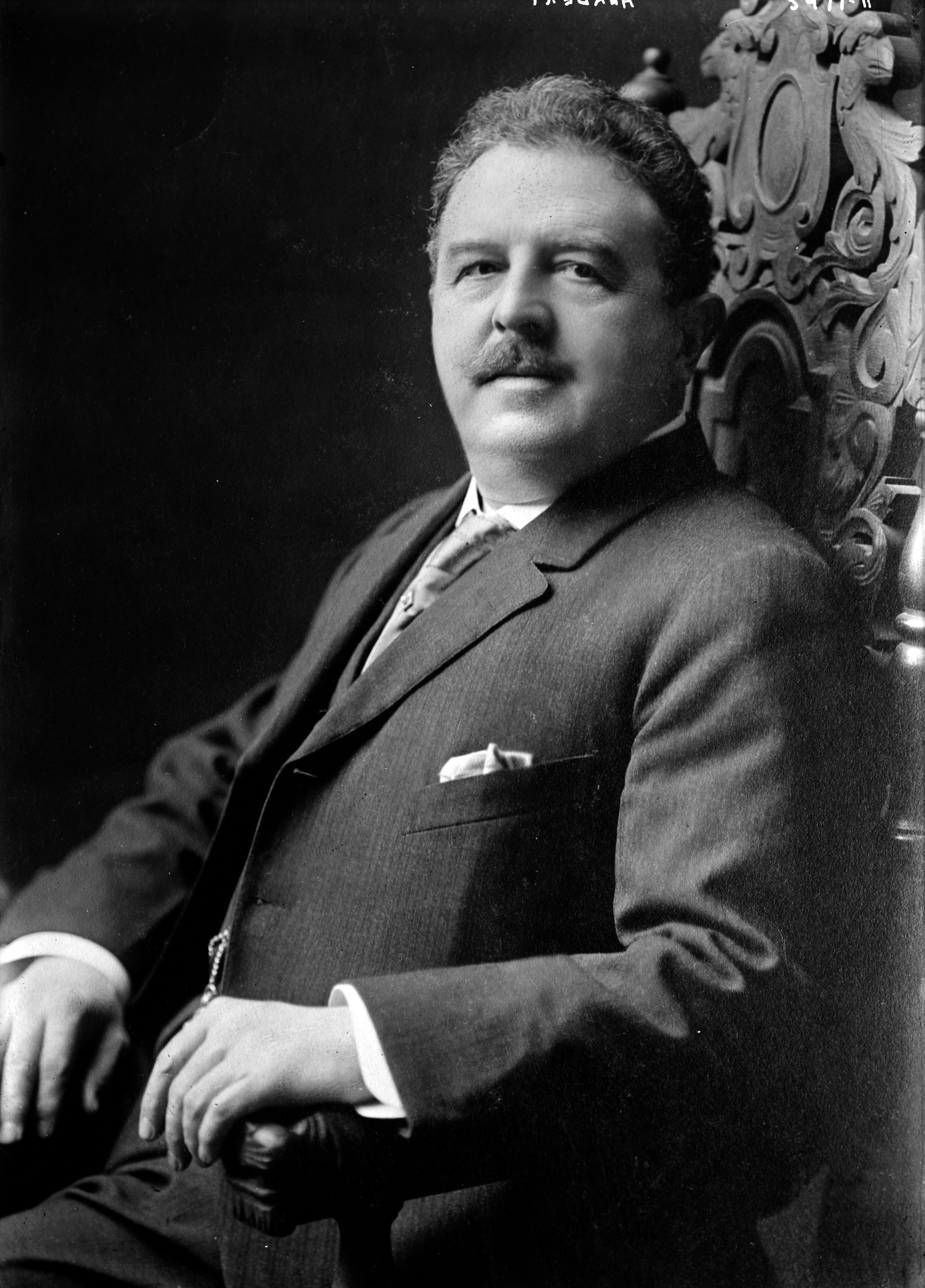
Madeleine's composer Victor Herbert (1859–1924)

Madeleine is an opera in one act by Victor Herbert set to a libretto by Grant Stewart, after the French play Je dîne chez ma mère (I'm dining at my mother's house) by Adrien Decourcelle and Lambert-Thiboust. It premiered at the Metropolitan Opera in New York on 24 January 1914 with Frances Alda in the title role.

== Reception and performance history ==
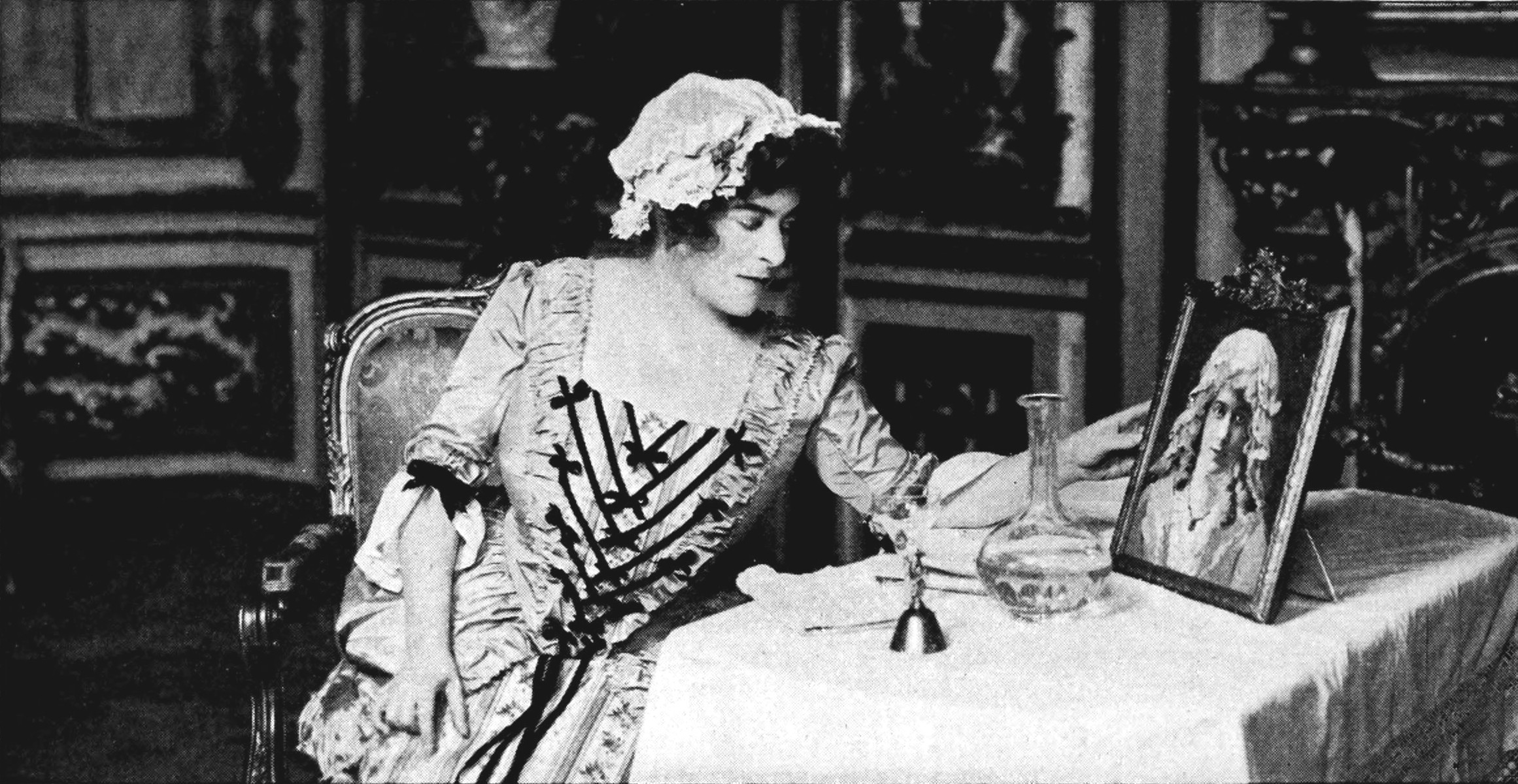
Madeleine dines with her mother. From The Victrola Book of the Opera.

For its world premiere on 24 January 1914, Madeleine was presented at the Metropolitan Opera as a double-bill with Pagliacci (with Caruso as Canio). It had a total of six performances at the Met, three times paired with Pagliacci, twice with Don Pasquale, and once (for its final performance) with the United States premiere of Wolf-Ferrari's L'amore medico.

Madeleine was Herbert's second opera, but in contrast to many of his operettas and musicals, it did not prove popular and dropped from sight after its premiere run. Although it received a warm reception from the first night audience, particularly Madeleine's aria, "A Perfect Day", the New York Times critic dismissed it as "not a notable landmark in the progress of native art."

== Roles ==
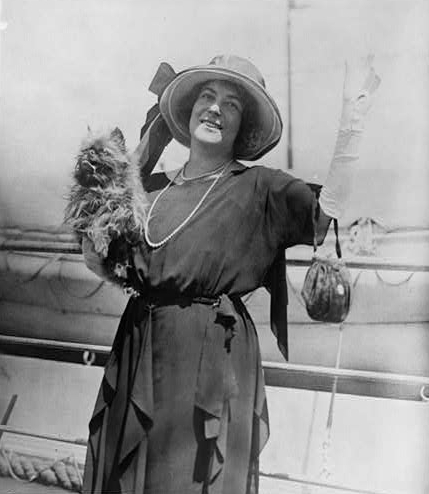
Frances Alda, who created the role of Madeleine Fleury

Role	Voice type	Premiere cast 24 January 1914
Madeleine Fleury	soprano	Frances Alda
Francois, Duc d'Esterre	tenor	Paul Althouse
Nichette, Madeleine's maid	soprano	Lenora Sparkes
Chevalier de Mauprat	baritone	Antonio Pini-Corsi
Didier, a painter	bass	Andrés De Segurola
Coachman	bass	Marcel Reiner
Servant	bass	Armin Laufer
Servant	bass	Stefen Buckreus
Servant	tenor	Alfred Sappio

== Synopsis ==
The story is set in Paris around 1760. It recounts the chagrin of Madeleine Fleury, a brilliant prima donna with the Paris Opéra, who cannot persuade any of her admirers and lovers to dine with her on New Year's Day. All of them have promised to dine with their mothers instead. Even her maid refuses for the same reason. Her childhood friend, Didier, a modest artist, invites her to dine with him and his parents, but in the end, she refuses and dines alone before a portrait of her mother painted by Didier.

== Sources ==
- Herbert, Victor and Stewart, Grant, Madeleine, vocal score published by G. Schirmer, 1914.
- Ledbetter, Steven, "Herbert, Victor ", Grove Music Online ed. L. Macy (Accessed 31 October 2009), (subscription access)
- Metropolitan Opera Madeleine on the MetOpera Database
- New York Times, "Herbert's Opera 'Madeleine' Sung", 25 January 1914, p. 22.
