= A Night in Old Paris =

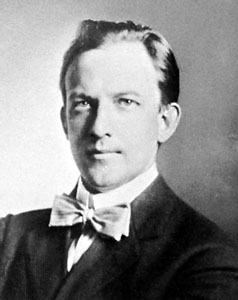
Henry Kimball Hadley

A Night in Old Paris is a short dramatic opera by American composer Henry Kimball Hadley with an English libretto by Frederick Truesdell, based on a play by Glen Macdonough. It premiered on December 14, 1924, in a private performance at the Metropolitan Opera House as part of a "Lambs Gambol", a meeting of the Lambs Club, a theatrical club in New York City. About 700 invited guests attended, including Will Rogers. It was first performed for the public in a radio performance on January 20, 1933. Never published, its manuscript full score, vocal score, and orchestral parts are all in the collection of the New York Public Library for the Performing Arts, at Lincoln Center in New York City. The original working title of the opera was Knights of the Hemp.

== Story ==
The setting of the opera is a small Parisian tavern, in the dead of winter, during the 17th century. A group of torturers meet, and compare stories. The mistress of the tavern listens intently as one of the men recounts how, years ago, he'd tortured a young man. Just before the young man died, he'd promised his tormentor that one day he'd return from the grave to drag his soul to hell. Hearing the story, the mistress realizes that this cruel man had once been her lover—who'd abandoned her, unaware that she was pregnant. She also realized to her horror, that the young man he was boasting about murdering had been their son. As members of this cruel brotherhood get up to leave, she entices her former love to remain for another drink with her. She secretly poisons his drink, and relates the part of his story that he did not know to him as he dies in agony. As he slumps to the floor, the tavern door swings violently open, and the shade of the dead youth arrives to claim the soul of his torturer.
