= Streets of Pekin =

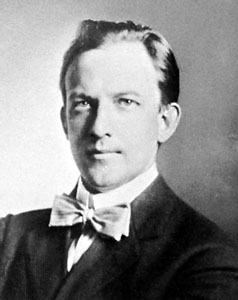
Henry Kimball Hadley

Streets of Pekin is an orchestral suite written by American composer Henry Kimball Hadley while visiting Japan in the summer of 1930. It became one of his most popular late works.

Hadley was in Japan to conduct six concerts with the New Symphony Orchestra in Tokyo. As a side trip, the composer had travelled to Beijing as a tourist. Once back in Japan, while vacationing at a villa in the Japanese Alps, Hadley wrote this orchestral suite in an effort to set in music what he'd experienced during his Chinese excursion. He conducted its premiere in Japan with the New Symphony Orchestra.

The Suite is made up of seven short movements:

1. Great Stone Man's Street
2. Sweet Rain Street
3. Rickshaw Boy No. 309
4. Jade Street (Moonlight)
5. Shoe-maker's Street
6. Sleeping Lotuses
7. The Forbidden City

Performance materials are available from the Free Library of Philadelphia.
