= Orville Harrold =

American opera singer

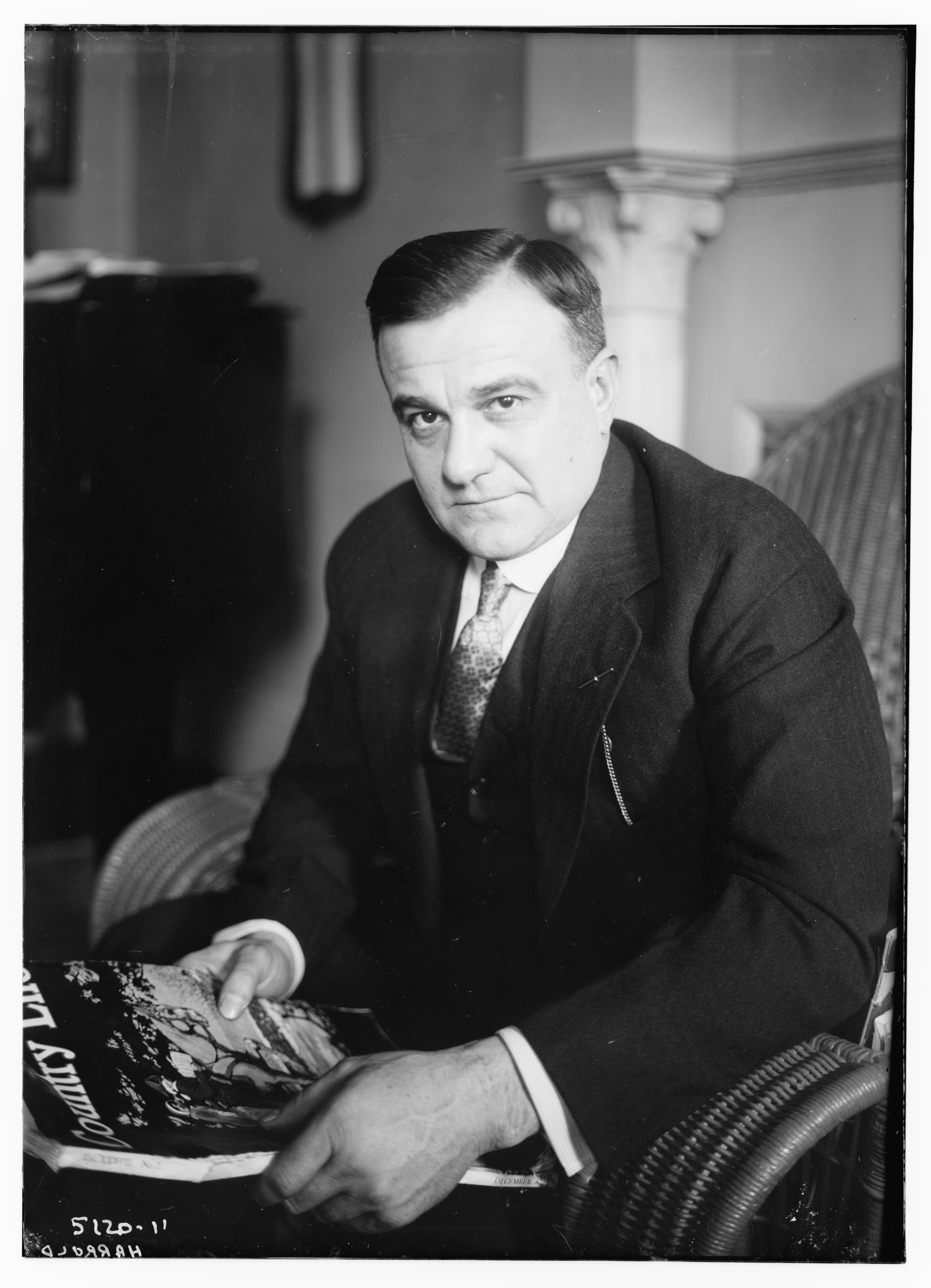
Orville Harrold in 1919

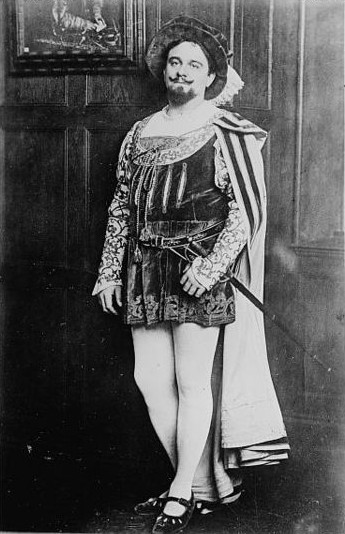
Orville Harrold in Faust

Orville Harrold (17 November 1877 – 23 October 1933) was an American operatic tenor and musical theatre actor. He began his career in 1906 as a performer in operettas in New York City, and was also seen during his early career in cabaret, musical theatre, and vaudeville performances. With the aid of Oscar Hammerstein I, he branched out into opera in 1910 as a leading tenor with Hammerstein's opera houses in New York City and Philadelphia. While his career from this point on primarily consisted of opera performances, he periodically returned to operetta and musical theatre throughout his career. He notably created the role of Captain Dick Warrington in the world premiere of Victor Herbert's operetta Naughty Marietta in November 1910.

As an opera singer, Harrold specialized in the lyric tenor repertoire of the Italian and French languages. In 1911–1912 he performed with Hammerstein's opera house in London. From 1912 to 1922 he was one of the leading opera tenors in Chicago; performing with a variety of companies in that city. He spent the last 6 years of his opera career performing at the Metropolitan Opera in New York City; giving his last opera performance there in 1924. He continued to perform in vaudeville entertainments up into the late 1920s. He made several gramophone records during his career; including recordings for Edison Records, Columbia Records (1913–1916) and the Victor Talking Machine Company (1920–1924).

== Early life ==
Born in Cowan, Indiana, Harrold was the son of John William Harrold and his wife Emily Harrold (née Chalfant). His parents were farmers and at the age of 9 he moved with his family to Lyons, Kansas. They moved again to Newton, Kansas, when he was 13. In Newton he began taking singing lessons with his school's music supervisor, Mrs. Gaston Boyd, who was a graduate of the New England Conservatory. In Kansas he sang with various community and church choruses and performed in a vocal quartet. He also won a local music competition. In 1893 he performed at the Chicago World's Fair. In 1894 he and his family returned to Cowan, Indiana. He played in a band in Muncie where he also began taking violin lessons and sang in church choirs. In 1898 he married Euphamia Evelyn “Effie” Kiger with whom he had three children. They divorced in 1913. His second wife was a fellow singer, Lydia Locke; they married in 1913 and divorced in 1917.

== Education and early career ==
After being encouraged to pursue a singing career by Ernestine Schumann-Heink, Harrold moved to New York in 1906 to pursue studies in opera and acting. He made his stage debut in the summer of 1906 in the light operetta The Social Whirl at The Shubert Organization's Casino Theatre. The following year he portrayed Lord Drinkwell in the original production of Julian Edwards and Stanislaus Stange's The Belle of London Town at the Lincoln Square Theatre. In 1908 he performed in the touring vaudeville show Wine, Women, & Song.

After appearing in several operetta productions in minor theatres and singing in cabaret performances in New York City for a few years, Harrold finally had a big break in his career when he drew the attention of Oscar Hammerstein I in 1909. Hammerstein "discovered" the singer while attending an operetta he was in at the Victoria Theater. Hammerstein took the singer in hand and put him under the tutelage of voice teacher Oscar Saenger; paying for the singing lessons himself. Harrold later pursued further studies in Paris in 1912–13.

In 1910 Harrold joined the roster of singers at both Hammerstein's Manhattan Opera House and Hammerstein's Philadelphia Opera Company; making his debut with both companies in the Spring of 1910 as Canio in Ruggero Leoncavallo's Pagliacci with Mario Sammarco as Tonio and Giuseppe Sturani conducting. He sang in one more role with those companies, a triumphant success as the Duke of Mantua in Giuseppe Verdi's Rigoletto with Giovanni Polese in the title role and Luisa Tetrazzini as Gilda, before they went bankrupt later that year.

In November 1910 Harrold returned to performing the operetta repertoire when he starred as Captain Dick Warrington in the first production of Victor Herbert's Naughty Marietta opposite Emma Trentini in the title role at the New York Theater. A success, he stayed with the show for most of 1911 when in toured the United States. He continued to perform in operas as well in 1911–1912 at Hammerstein's London Opera House, portraying Alfredo in Verdi's La Traviata, Arnold Melchtal in Gioachino Rossini's William Tell, the Duke of Mantua, Edgardo in Gaetano Donizetti's Lucia di Lammermoor, Ferrando in Donizetti's La favorite, Jean Grenicheux in Robert Planquette's Les cloches de Corneville, Romeo in Gounod's Roméo et Juliette, and the title role in Charles Gounod's Faust.

== Singing in Chicago and in other American cities ==
Harrold was one of the leading tenors in the city of Chicago from 1912 to 1922. He sang with the Chicago Grand Opera Company (1912–1913), the Chicago Opera Association (1916–1919), and the Chicago Civic Opera (1922). He also performed in operas at Ravinia Park during the summer months of 1916–1919 and 1922; portraying the roles of Alfredo, Almaviva in Rossini's The Barber of Seville, Canio, Des Grieux in Jules Massenet's Manon (with Marguerite Bériza as the title heroine), Dimitri in Modest Mussorgsky's Boris Godunov, Don José in Georges Bizet's Carmen, the Duke of Mantua, Edgardo, Faust, Gerald in Léo Delibes's Lakmé, Lionel in Friedrich von Flotow's Martha, Nemorino in Donizetti's L'elisir d'amore, Pinkerton in Giacomo Puccini's Madama Butterfly, Rodolfo in Puccini's La bohème, Thaddeus in Michael William Balfe's The Bohemian Girl, Turiddu in Cavalleria Rusticana, Win-San-Lui in Franco Leoni's L’oracolo, and the title roles in The Tales of Hoffmann and L'amico Fritz.

In 1913 Harrold sang at the Indianapolis Wagner Festival. He returned to New York City in 1914–1915 to perform with the Century Opera Company; singing the roles of Lionel, Pinkerton, Radames in Verdi's Aida, and Gounod's Romeo. He returned to vaudeville in 1915, performing operetta and opera arias in a variety show at the Palace Theatre in New York City. He then performed the role of "The Hero" in the original cast of the musical Hip! Hip! Hooray! at the New York Hippodrome which ran for 425 performances from September 30, 1915, to June 3, 1916. In 1918–1919 he sang with the Society of American Singers in New York City as Canio, Hoffmann, Lionel, Nanki-Poo in The Mikado, Pinkerton, Thaddeus, Turridu, and the title roles in Daniel Auber's Fra Diavolo and Reginald De Koven's Robin Hood. In the Spring of 1919 he toured the United States with the Scotti Opera Company, singing Pinkerton, Turiddu, and Win-San-Lui.

== Later career at the Metropolitan Opera and later life ==
Harrold was one of the leading tenors at the Metropolitan Opera in New York City from 1919 to 1924. He made his debut at the Met as Prince Leopold in Fromental Halévy's La Juive with Enrico Caruso as Eléazar and Rosa Ponselle as Rachel. The following year he created the role of Meïamoun in the world premiere of Henry Kimball Hadley's Cleopatra's Night. He sang in several United States premieres at the Met, including starring turns in Erich Wolfgang Korngold's Die tote Stadt (1921, opposite Maria Jeritza) and Nikolai Rimsky-Korsakov's The Snow Maiden (1922, as the Tsar). He also performed the role of Julien in the Met's first staging of Gustave Charpentier's Louise in January 1921 with Geraldine Farrar in the title role. Some of the other roles he sang at the Met were Almaviva, Dmitri, Don José, Edgardo, Faust, the Italian Singer in Richard Strauss' Der Rosenkavalier, Nicias in Massenet's Thaïs, Pinkerton, Rodolfo, Turiddu, Win-San-Lui, and the title roles in Richard Wagner's Lohengrin and Wagner's Parsifal.

Harrold also made several appearances at Carnegie Hall while singing at the Met. In 1922 he sang opposite Madame Charles Cahier in the New York premiere of Mahler's Das Lied von der Erde under conductor Artur Bodanzky. After leaving the Met in 1924, he never performed in opera again. He made one last appearance on Broadway in 1925, starring as Peter Novak in the musical Holka Polka at the Lyric Theatre. He continued to perform in vaudeville up into the late 1920s.

He died in 1933 in Norwalk, Connecticut.

== Legacy ==
His son Jack Harrold was a buffo tenor with the New York City Opera.
