= Bianca (opera) =

1917 opera by Henry Kimball Hadley

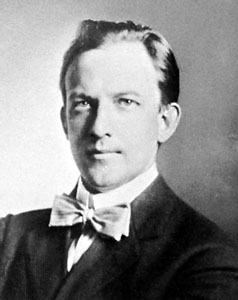
Henry Kimball Hadley

Bianca is a one act opera by American composer Henry Kimball Hadley. The opera's libretto was an English-language adaptation of Carlo Goldoni's comedy The Mistress of the Inn by Grant Stewart. Hadley finished the score in January 1917, and entered it in a competition for the best American opera without chorus, for which William Wade Hinshaw offered a $1000 prize and a promise to produce the opera in New York City by the American Society of Singers. It won, and was produced on October 19, 1918, at the Park Theater in Manhattan, with the composer conducting, and soprano Maggie Teyte in the title role.
