= Lydia Locke =

American opera singer

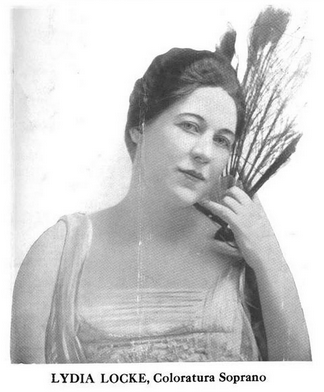
Lydia Locke with fan, from a 1918 publication

Lydia Locke (August 1, 1884 – July 31, 1966) was an American soprano whose eventful personal life, including seven marriages and a murder trial, made national headlines for decades.

== Early life ==
Lydia Mae Locke was born in Liberty, Illinois and raised in Hannibal, Missouri, the daughter of Newton Bushnell Locke and Lucy Ann Holcomb Locke.

== Career ==
From 1911 to 1912, Lydia Locke performed with the London Opera Company under Oscar Hammerstein I. She also gave recitals. She made her New York stage debut in 1915, taking over the role of Marguerite in Faust at the Academy of Music. Locke's activities off-stage, including vacations and fashion choices, were followed by the press.

== Personal life ==
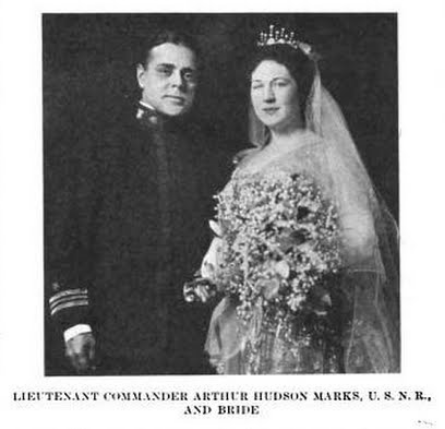
Lydia Locke and Arthur Hudson Marks, her third husband, on their wedding day in 1918

Lydia Locke married seven times. Her first marriage, to gambler A. W. "Prince" Talbot, ended in 1909 when she shot him in a lawyer's office during an argument. She was tried and acquitted in 1911 for Talbot's murder, successfully proving that he was an abusive husband, and further that the shooting was accidental. Her second husband was a fellow opera singer, Orville Harrold; they married in 1913 and divorced in 1917. That same year, Locke married her third husband, Arthur Hudson Marks, a naval officer and businessman; they divorced in 1924. Her fourth husband was her young assistant Harry Dornblaser, who left her during their honeymoon in Europe, and died by suicide a few months later.

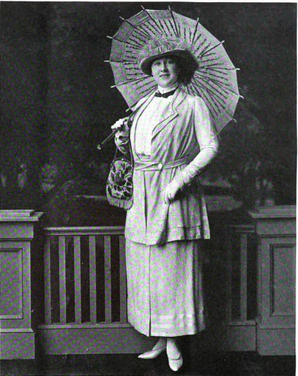
Lydia Locke with parasol, from a 1918 publication

After some legal entanglements involving ex-husband Arthur Marks, including a stolen baby, a false paternity charge, and "poison-pen" letters about Marks' next wife, she married her fifth husband, Count Carlo M. Marinovich, in 1927; they divorced by 1932. There must have been a sixth husband, though the details of that are unclear. She counted her last husband, real estate developer Irwin Rose, as her seventh. They married in 1954 and lived in Yorktown Heights, New York at "Locke Ledge", her mansion, which they ran as an inn.

Lydia Locke was erroneously reported dead in 1912, after a car accident that probably limited her stage career. In fact, she died in 1966, aged 82 years. She had a son, Newton Locke, adopted in 1922 during her marriage to Arthur Marks.

Soon after her death, the Davenport House museum in Yorktown acquired a collection of her stage costumes. They displayed one of her concert gowns on a life-sized cardboard figure of Locke, beside a piano in the drawing room.
