= SS Henry Hadley =

Liberty ship of WWII

History

United States
- Name: Henry Hadley
- Namesake: Henry Hadley
- Owner: War Shipping Administration (WSA)
- Operator: T.J. Stevenson & Co., Inc.
- Ordered: as type (EC2-S-C1) hull, MC hull 2489
- Awarded: 23 April 1943
- Builder: St. Johns River Shipbuilding Company, Jacksonville, Florida
- Cost: $1,013,742
- Yard number: 53
- Way number: 5
- Laid down: 26 June 1944
- Launched: 8 August 1944
- Completed: 22 August 1944
- Identification: Call sign: WSPW
- Fate: Laid up in the National Defense Reserve Fleet, Wilmington, North Carolina, 8 March 1948; Laid up in the National Defense Reserve Fleet, Mobile, Alabama, 23 May 1952; Sold for scrapping, 28 October 1971, withdrawn from fleet, 23 May 1972

General characteristics
- Class & type: Liberty ship; type EC2-S-C1, standard
- Tonnage: 10,865 LT DWT; 7,176 GRT
- Displacement: 3,380 long tons (3,434 t) (light); 14,245 long tons (14,474 t) (max)
- Length: 441 feet 6 inches (135 m) oa; 416 feet (127 m) pp; 427 feet (130 m) lwl
- Beam: 57 feet (17 m)
- Draft: 27 ft 9.25 in (8.4646 m)
- Installed power: 2 × Oil fired 450 °F (232 °C) boilers, operating at 220 psi (1,500 kPa); 2,500 hp (1,900 kW)
- Propulsion: 1 × triple-expansion steam engine, (manufactured by General Machinery Corp., Hamilton, Ohio); 1 × screw propeller
- Speed: 11.5 knots (21.3 km/h; 13.2 mph)
- Capacity: 562,608 cubic feet (15,931 m^{3}) (grain); 499,573 cubic feet (14,146 m^{3}) (bale)
- Complement: 38–62 USMM; 21–40 USNAG
- Armament: Varied by ship; Bow-mounted 3-inch (76 mm)/50-caliber gun; Stern-mounted 4-inch (102 mm)/50-caliber gun; 2–8 × single 20-millimeter (0.79 in) Oerlikon anti-aircraft (AA) cannons and/or, 2–8 × 37-millimeter (1.46 in) M1 AA guns

SS Henry Hadley was a Liberty ship built in the United States during World War II. She was named after Henry Hadley, an American composer and conductor.

== Construction ==
Henry Hadley was laid down on 26 June 1944, under a Maritime Commission (MARCOM) contract, MC hull 2489, by the St. Johns River Shipbuilding Company, Jacksonville, Florida; and was launched on 8 August 1944.

== History ==
She was allocated to the T.J. Stevenson & Co., Inc., on 22 August 1944. On 8 March 1948, she was laid up in the National Defense Reserve Fleet, Wilmington, North Carolina. On 23 May 1952, she was laid up in the National Defense Reserve Fleet, Mobile, Alabama. She was sold for scrapping, 28 October 1971, to Union Minerals & Alloys Corp. She was removed from the fleet, 23 May 1972.

== Bibliography ==
- "St. John's River Shipbuilding, Jacksonville FL". www.ShipbuildingHistory.com. 16 October 2010.
- Maritime Administration. "Henry Hadley". Ship History Database Vessel Status Card. U.S. Department of Transportation, Maritime Administration.
- Davies, James (May 2004). "Specifications (As-Built)" (PDF). p. 23.
- "SS Henry Hadley".
