= Frances Alda =

New Zealand opera singer (1879–1952)

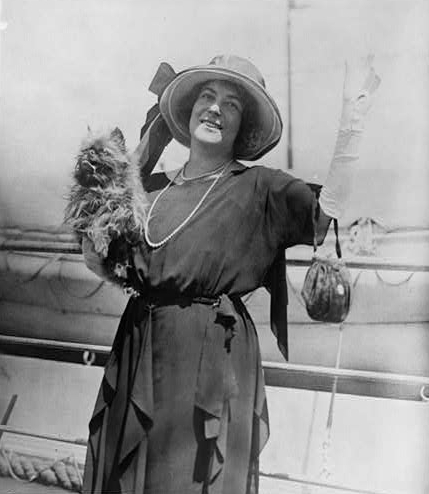
- Alda circa 1920
- Born: Frances Jane Davis; May 31, 1879; Christchurch, New Zealand
- Died: September 18, 1952 (aged 73); Venice, Italy
- Spouses: Giulio Gatti-Casazza (m. 1910; div. 1928) Miner Raymond VirDen (m. 1941)

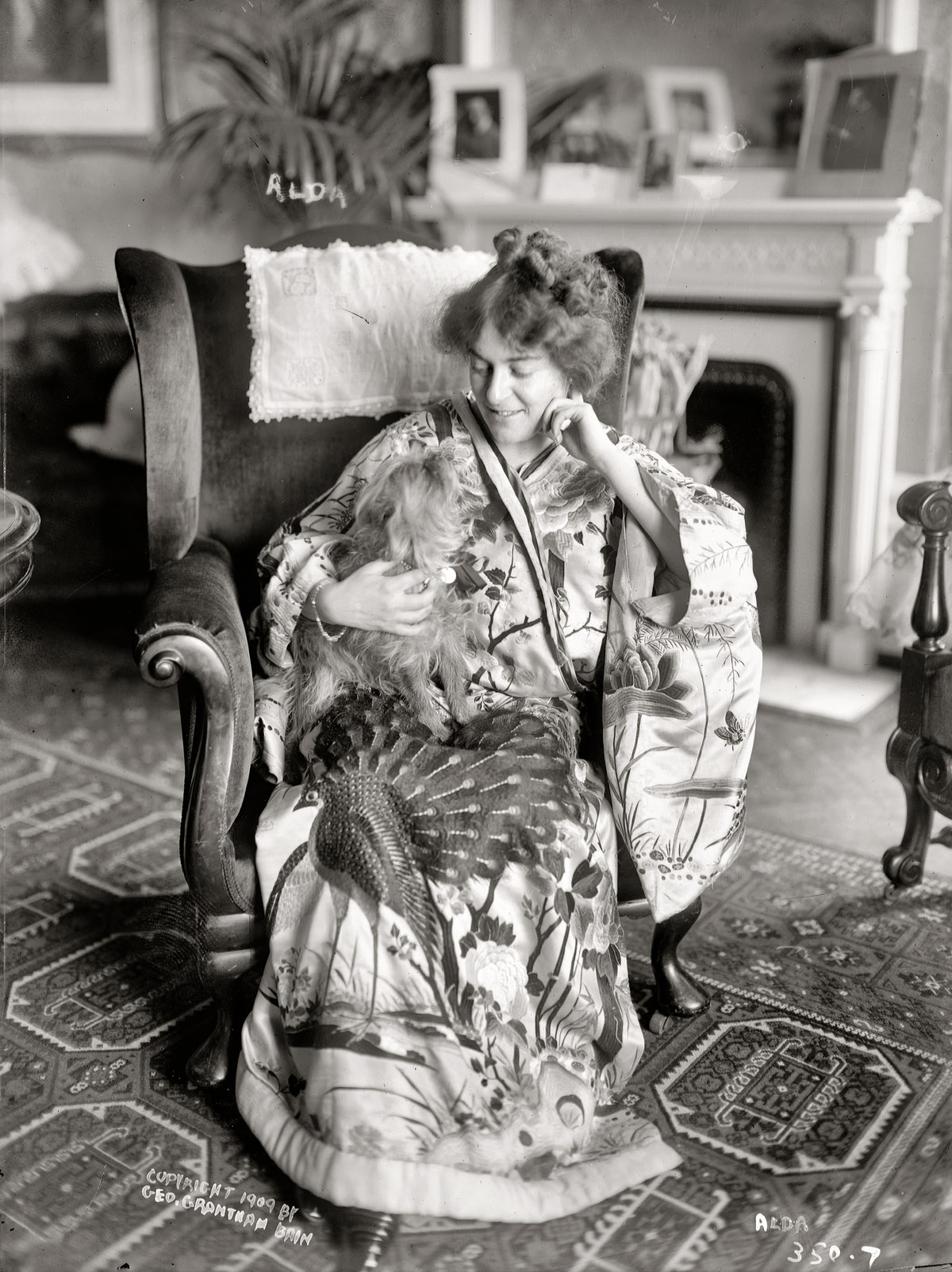
Frances Alda relaxing away from the stage, 1909

Frances Davis Alda (born Frances Jane Davis; 31 May 1879 – 18 September 1952) was a New Zealand-born, Australian-raised operatic lyric soprano. She achieved fame during the first three decades of the 20th century due to her outstanding singing voice, fine technique and colourful personality, as well as her frequent onstage partnerships at the Metropolitan Opera, New York, with Enrico Caruso.

== Career ==
Alda was born Frances Jane Davis in Christchurch, New Zealand, on 31 May 1879 (Note: Alda amended her birth year to 1883 to make herself more appealing to operatic managers. This incorrect year is often recorded as her actual year of birth.) to David Davis and Leonora Davis, née Simonsen. (Note: Elsewhere named as Leonora Martina "Leo" Simonsen) In July 1879, she and her elder brother (Note: Hyman Albert Davis was born in Christchurch, New Zealand, on 8 September 1877.) were sent to Melbourne with their mother, a promising singer from a musical family. In September 1880 Leonora divorced David and resumed her singing career. Frances, known as Fanny, spent her early years traveling with her mother on her operatic tours. After false starts in Australasia, she took Fanny and her brother to San Francisco, California in 1883. Leonora Davis died of peritonitis in San Francisco on 29 December 1884, shortly after remarrying, to Herman Adler.

After her mother's death, Alda was sent to live with her maternal grandparents, Martin and Fanny Simonsen, in Melbourne, Victoria, Australia.

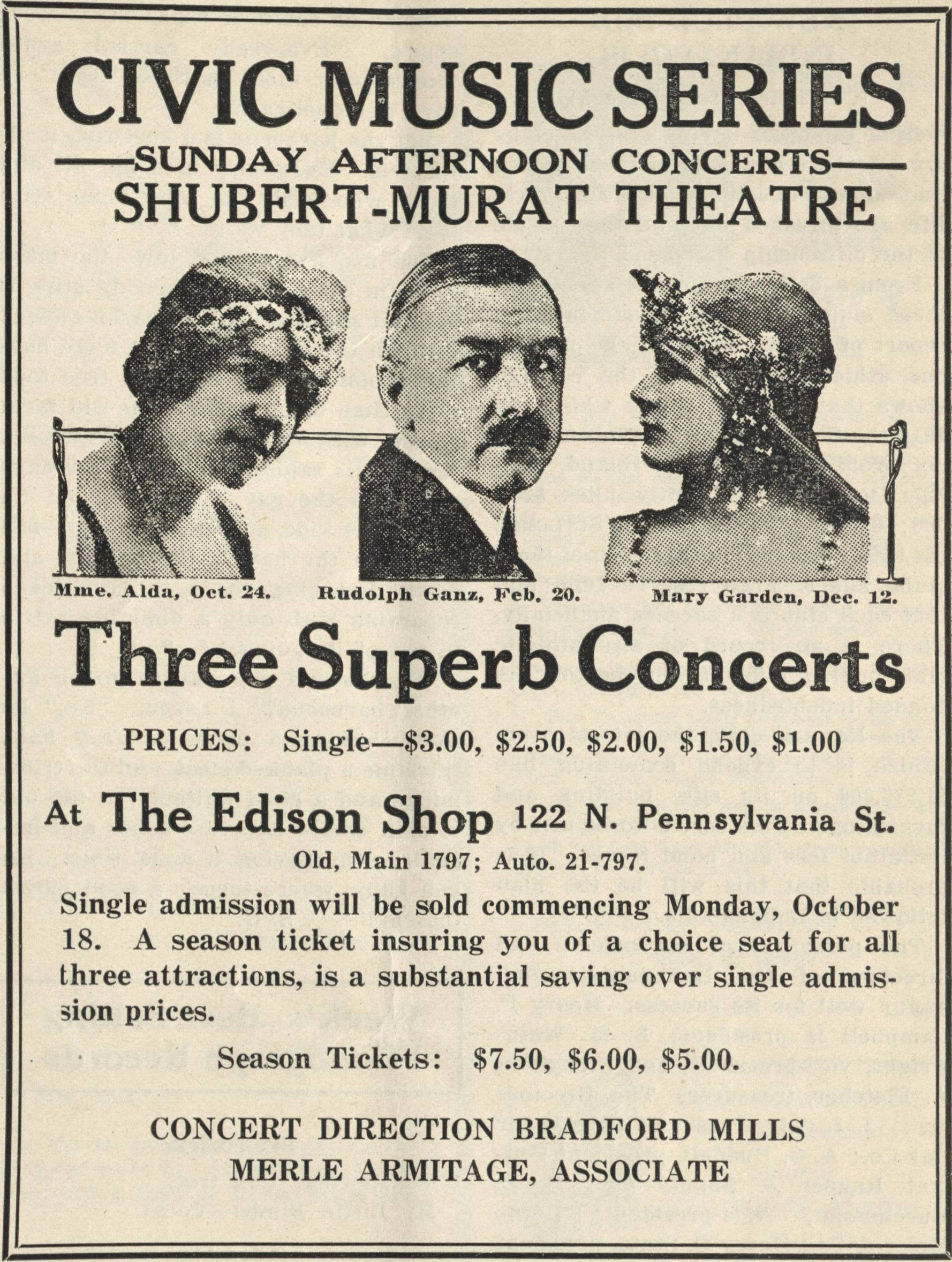
1920 newspaper advertisement for an Alda concert at the Murat Theater in Indianapolis, USA.

She sang in productions of Gilbert and Sullivan in Melbourne before leaving Australia for Europe at the age of 22 in order to undertake additional study and pursue an international singing career like her future soprano rival Nellie Melba. At the recommendation of André Messager, she auditioned for Mathilde Marchesi. Upon her audition, Marchesi proclaimed "J'ai trouvé la nouvelle Melba" (I've found the new Melba). Alda recalled "Marchesi altered the entire course of my life," giving her her stage name and going as far to determine where Alda would live. After her lesson, Marchesi insisted that Alda stay and sit through other pupils' lessons in order to increase her learning. Marchesi arranged for Alda to learn stage direction from Victor Capoul.</ref name=forty-three> Marchesi also had Alda become a participant in her social circle, allowing her to meet a wide variety of musicians and discuss numerous aspects of music.

Alda made her debut at the Opéra-Comique on April 15, 1904 in Jules Massenet's Manon, a role in which she was taught by the composer. She appeared at the Royal Opera House Covent Garden in 1906, and at La Scala, Milan, during the 1906-08 seasons. Conductor Arturo Toscanini taught Alda the title role in Louise as well as Mimi in La bohème.

In 1908, the former La Scala impresario Giulio Gatti-Casazza became director of the Metropolitan Opera. On 7 December 1908 Alda made her debut there. According to American Art News (New York, 19 March 1910), Adolfo Müller-Ury was painting Alda just before her marriage. It was in New York that Alda furthered her career, appearing to acclaim in such famous operas as Martha, Manon Lescaut, Otello, Faust, Mefistofele and La bohème. She began recording for the Victor Talking Machine Company in 1908 and several of her records became best-sellers. She created the title roles in Victor Herbert's Madeleine and Henry Hadley's Cleopatra's Night as well as Roxane in Walter Damrosch's Cyrano. She also sang regularly with Enrico Caruso.

Alda toured Australia and New Zealand in 1927, saying in an interview she loathed the former. In 1929, she left the Met but continued to give concerts, make radio broadcasts and appear in vaudeville. She also taught students, among them the dilettante Ganna Walska.

Alda's 1937 autobiography was titled Men, Women, & Tenors.

She had an affluent retirement in a house she remodeled and called Casa Mia, located in Great Neck, New York. With her husband she spent much time travelling. She died of a stroke on 18 September 1952 in Venice, Italy, aged 73.

== Personal ==
Even prior to her Metropolitan Opera debut in 1908, Giulio Gatti-Casazza had been pursuing her by way of numerous letters and cablegrams. Despite her ambivalent feelings about him, they married on 4 April 1910. In her autobiography Alda recalled that Gatti-Casazza's called himself "a melancholy man". Alda later called his refusal to emerge from his depressed outlook a "sullen obstinacy". By the mid-1920s she and Gatti-Casazza were leading separate lives; their separation and divorce in 1928 were a formality.

On 14 April 1941, she married Manhattan advertising executive Ray Vir Den in Charleston, South Carolina. He was a decade younger than she.

"O mio babbino caro"
"O mio babbino caro" from Giacomo Puccini's Gianni Schicchi, sung by Frances Alda in 1919.

"Ancora un passo"
A 1913 recording of "Ancora un passo" from Giacomo Puccini's Madama Butterfly.

She is buried in All Saints Episcopal Church Cemetery in Great Neck, Long Island.
