= Henry Kimball Hadley =

American composer and conductor

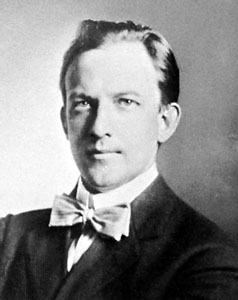
- Hadley, c. 1900
- Born: 20 December 1871; Somerville, Massachusetts, US
- Died: 6 September 1937 (aged 66); New York City, US
- Resting place: Mount Auburn Cemetery
- Occupations: Composer; conductor
- Years active: 1893–1937
- Spouse: Inez Barbour Hadley

Henry Kimball Hadley (20 December 1871 – 6 September 1937) was an American composer and conductor.

== Early life ==
Hadley was born in Somerville, Massachusetts, to a musical family. His father, from whom he received his first musical instruction in violin and piano, was a secondary school music teacher, his mother was active in church music, and his brother Arthur went on to a successful career as a professional cellist. In the Hadley home, the two brothers played string quartets with their father on viola and the composer Henry F. Gilbert on second violin.

Hadley also studied harmony with his father and with Stephen A. Emery, and, from the age of fourteen, he studied composition with the prominent American composer George Whitefield Chadwick. Under Chadwick's tutelage, Hadley composed many works, including songs, chamber music, a musical, and an orchestral overture.

In 1893, Hadley toured with the Laura Schirmer-Mapleson Opera Company as a violinist. But he left the tour when the company encountered financial difficulties and was unable to pay his salary.

In 1894, he travelled to Vienna to further his studies with Eusebius Mandyczewski. Hadley loved the artistic atmosphere of the city, where he could attend countless concerts and operas, and where he occasionally saw Brahms in the cafes. He heard Tchaikovsky's Sixth Symphony while there, and it made a strong impact on him. During this period Hadley also befriended the German-American conductor Adolf Neuendorff, who gave him advice regarding his compositions.

== Professional life ==
He returned to the United States in 1896 and took a position as the musical instructor at St. Paul's Episcopal School for Boys in Garden City, New York, where he worked until 1902. He wrote some of his important early compositions during his time there, including his overture In Bohemia, and his first and second symphonies. He also found prominent conductors to perform them, such as Walter Damrosch, Victor Herbert, John Philip Sousa, and Anton Seidl. Hadley made his own debut as a conductor on 16 January 1900, at the Waldorf-Astoria hotel, leading a program mostly made up of his own works.

In an age when American orchestras preferred European conductors to home-grown ones, Hadley felt that he needed to establish himself in Europe. So he returned to Europe in 1904 to tour, compose, and study with Ludwig Thuille in Munich. It is possible that his studies with Thuille were suggested by Richard Strauss, whom Hadley met shortly after arriving in Europe. Hadley composed his symphonic poem Salome in 1905, not realizing that Strauss, whom he greatly admired, was working on an opera on the same subject. The work was eventually performed in at least 19 European cities, and he was invited to conduct it, along with his newly finished third symphony, with the Berlin Philharmonic in 1907. In the same year, he obtained a position as an assistant conductor at the opera house in Mainz. In April 1909, his first opera, Safié, premiered in Mainz under his baton.

=== Conducting ===
Later that year he returned to the United States to take a position as conductor of the Seattle Symphony. In 1911, he became the first conductor of the San Francisco Symphony. Hadley encountered some difficulties in San Francisco, where he tried to turn a group of theater musicians into a first rate orchestra. He brought a number of excellent musicians from the east, including his brother Arthur, to be principals in the new orchestra, but this created some resentments among the locals. Nonetheless, by his departure in 1915, the orchestra had made great strides.

Hadley returned to New York in 1915, where he made many appearances as a guest conductor, and premiered many of his best-known works. In 1918 he married the lyric soprano Inez Barbour, whom he had met in San Francisco, and who recorded his music as early as 1915. She thereafter sang many of her husband's works. Between 1917 and 1920 three of Hadley's operas received high-profile premieres, including Cleopatra's Night which bowed at the Metropolitan Opera on 31 January 1920. Hadley conducted some of the performances, becoming the first American composer to conduct his own opera at the Met, and the opera was revived the following season. Several critics judged it the best among the ten American operas to appear at the Met to that point.

In 1921 Hadley was invited to become the associate conductor of the New York Philharmonic, the first American conductor to hold a full-time post with a major American orchestra. During his years there, his conducting received excellent reviews. As well as occasionally taking the helm for regular philharmonic concerts, Hadley was assigned to lead stadium concerts during the summer, where he selected many works by American composers. He was eventually asked to regularly select American works for the philharmonic to perform. He remained in this post until 1927, when he resigned.

In that same year, Hadley was invited to conduct the first half of the season of the Philharmonic Orchestra of Buenos Aires, the first American to conduct the orchestra (the second half was conducted by legendary Clemens Krauss).

In 1929, Hadley was invited to become the conductor of the newly formed Manhattan Symphony Orchestra. He led the orchestra for three seasons, including an American work in every concert. He then stepped down due to his frustrations with fundraising for the orchestra in the wake of the stock market crash.

In 1930, Hadley was invited to conduct six concerts with the New Symphony Orchestra of Tokyo. His visit to Asia was met with great enthusiasm, and he composed a new orchestral suite, Streets of Pekin, inspired by a side trip to China, and led its world premiere with the Japanese orchestra.

=== Composing ===
Henry Hadley was one of the most performed and published American composers of his day. He considered himself first and foremost an orchestral composer, to which his many overtures, symphonic poems, orchestral suites, and symphonies attest. He also wrote brief concertos for both cello (his Konzertstück) and piano (his Concertino, Op. 131).

Yet he also wrote a large number of stage works, including several operettas and musicals, along with his five operas. His 1903 Broadway musical Nancy Brown was created as a starring vehicle for the actress Marie Cahill. Though his operas Azora and Cleopatra's Night received the most attention, his comedy Bianca, which won a prize offered by the American Society of Singers for the best chamber opera in English, perhaps due to its modest demands, received a number of performances during Hadley's lifetime and a few afterwards, even in Japan in the early 1950s.

During his years in San Francisco, Hadley made friends among the city's elite, which led him to become a member of the exclusive Bohemian Club, for which he wrote three "music dramas", designed to be given a single performance outdoors at the Bohemian Grove in Northern California. These works were very similar to operas, but also contained some spoken dialogue. Hadley later adapted music from these works to be performed as orchestral suites.

He also wrote a number of chamber works, although "he had no compelling desire" to compose them. He produced a violin sonata, two string quartets, and two piano trios. According to Tawa, his most noteworthy chamber effort was the quintet in a minor for piano and strings, Op. 50, written in 1919.

Hadley also wrote a large number of cantatas and oratorios, some of them, such as Resurgam, conceived on a very large scale. His work as a song composer is also noteworthy. Villamil claims that "Of his nearly 200 songs many can still be recommended for their unaffected, buoyant lyricism." She praises their "supple vocal lines" that are "sensitive to poetic concerns" and accompaniments that "can be inventive and provocative." One of his choruses from The New Earth titled, "Song of the Marching Men," has been recorded.

Overture: "Tannhäuser" by Richard Wagner, played by the New York Philharmonic Orchestra; Henry Hadley, Conducting (1926)

Hadley was also a pioneer in film music. He was filmed by Warner Bros. conducting the New York Philharmonic in the overture to Wagner's opera Tannhäuser, the Vitaphone short that opened the program including its 1926 film, Don Juan with John Barrymore; this was the first feature film with a synchronized music and sound effects score, which was compiled and composed by William Axt and David Mendoza, conducted by Herman Heller, and played by the New York Philharmonic. Subsequently, Hadley wrote a complete original Vitaphone score for the 1927 Barrymore film When a Man Loves in which Heller conducted the "Vitaphone Symphony Orchestra" for the soundtrack.

== Final years ==
In 1933, Hadley founded the National Association for American Composers and Conductors, which exists to this day. In spite of a cancer diagnosis in 1932, he decided to pursue his dream of establishing a summer classical music festival.

=== Berkshire Symphonic Music Festival – Tanglewood ===
In the spring of 1934, Hadley scouted the Berkshire Hills of western Massachusetts for a site and support for his seasonal music festival. The region's well known Gilded Age summer colony had not entirely faded in spite of the Great Depression. Hadley's inquiries led to the formidable and cultured Gertrude Robinson Smith. Within a few months they staged three days of concerts in August with Hadley conducting sixty-five members of the New York Philharmonic Orchestra. The first concert on 23 August was under the stars before an audience of 3,000, including Sara Roosevelt, the President's mother. For two more summers Hadley and Smith worked to achieve their vision of a permanent seasonal music festival. Initially known as the Berkshire Symphonic Music Festival, it soon became known as Tanglewood.

Hadley's cancer surgery was initially successful, and he continued his career as a composer and guest conductor. However, his popularity as a composer began to wane, as popular and especially critical opinion turned against the robust romanticism which Hadley's music embodied. The quick success of the Berkshire Philharmonic Festival's first three seasons was a dream fulfilled at the end of his life. Hadley's cancer recurred, and he died in New York City on 6 September 1937. He was buried at Mount Auburn Cemetery.

== Awards ==
During his lifetime he was awarded several honors: an honorary doctorate from Tufts University in 1925, membership in the National Institute of Arts and Letters and the American Academy of Arts and Letters, and the Order of Merit from the French government.

== Legacy ==
The majority of Hadley's personal papers and scores are housed in the Music Division of The New York Public Library for the Performing Arts. During his lifetime, Hadley's music was immensely popular, and was a regular part of the repertory of America's top orchestras, and was also performed in Europe. Many legendary conductors performed his music, including Gustav Mahler, Leopold Stokowski, Serge Koussevitzky, and Karl Muck. In recent years his music has been largely neglected, although a few recordings of his music have been issued. An enduring aspect of his legacy is Tanglewood, the realization of his dream to create a classical summer music festival.

The World War II Liberty Ship SS Henry Hadley was named in his honor.

The National Association for American Composers and Conductors established the Henry Hadley Medal, awarded annually for outstanding contributions to American music. The first medal was awarded to Howard Hanson in 1938; the last was given to Morton Gould in 1967. Other recipients included Sigmund Spaeth, Mayor Fiorello LaGuardia, Samuel Barber, Leopold Stokowski, Martha Graham and Nadia Boulanger.

== Compositions ==
=== Operas ===
- Safié Op. 63, 1909
- Bianca Op. 79, composed c. 1913, produced 1918
- Azora, the Daughter of Montezuma Op. 80, c. 1914, produced 1917
- Cleopatra's Night Op. 90, 1920
- A Night in Old Paris 1924

=== Symphonies ===
- Symphony No. 1 in D minor Op. 25 Youth and Life, 1897
- Symphony No. 2 in F minor Op. 30 The Four Seasons, 1899
- Symphony No. 3 in B minor Op. 60, 1907
- Symphony No. 4 in D minor Op. 64 North, East, South, West, 1910
- Symphony No. 5 in C minor Op. 140 Connecticut, 1935

=== Symphonic poems ===
- Salome Op. 55, 1905
- The Culprit Fay Op. 62, 1909
- Lucifer Op. 66, 1914
- Othello Op. 96, 1919
- The Ocean Op. 99, 1921

=== Musical theatre ===
- Nancy Brown 1903, Broadway musical
- The Atonement of Pan, A Music-Drama 1912, a Grove Play
- Semper Virens 1923, a Grove Play
- The Legend of Hani 1933, a Grove Play

=== Other orchestral works ===
- In Bohemia: Concert Overture, Op. 28
- Herod Overture, Op. 31
- Konzertstuck for violoncello and orchestra, Op. 61 (1909)
- "Aurora Borealis": Overture
- Otello overture, Op. 96 (1919)
- Streets of Pekin (1930)
- The Enchanted Castle, Op. 117
- San Francisco, Op. 121 (1931)
- Concertino for Piano and Orchestra, Op. 131
- Scherzo Diabolique, Op. 135 (1934)

=== Cantatas and oratorios ===
- Lelawala, A Legend of Niagara Op. 13
- In Music's Praise Op. 21
- The Princess of Ys Op. 34
- The Legend of Granada Op. 45
- The Nightingale and The Rose Op. 54
- The Fate of Princess Kiyo Op. 58
- The Golden Prince Op. 69
- Music: An Ode Op. 75
- The Fairy Thorn Op. 76
- The New Earth Op. 85
- Prophesy and Fulfillment Op. 91
- Resurgam Op. 98
- Mirtil in Arcadia Op. 100
- Belshazzar Op. 112
- Divine Tragedy Op. 139

=== Art songs ===
- Evening Song (Sidney Lanier), G. Schirmer, 1915
- I Heard a Maid with her Guitar, Op. 44, No. 3 (Clinton Scollard), Church, 1909
- Il pleut des pétales de fleurs (Albert Samain), G. Schirmer, 1909
- If You Would Have it So, Op. 84, No. 3 (Rabindranath Tagore), Carl Fischer, 1921
- The Lute Player of Casa Blanca, Op. 84, No. 1 (Laurence Hope), Fischer, 1921
- Stille, träumende Frühlingsnacht, Op. 42, No. 1 (Otto Julius Bierbaum), G. Schirmer, 1911
- The Time of Parting, Op. 84, No. 2 (Tagore), Fischer, 1921

=== Chamber works ===
- String Quartet No. 1 in A major, Op. 24
- Piano Trio No. 1 in C major, Op. 26
- Piano Quintet in A minor, Op. 50
- Piano Trio No. 2 in G minor (1932)
- String Quartet No. 2, Op. 132

== Selected recordings ==
- The Culprit Fay. National Symphony Orchestra of Ukraine. conductor John McLaughlin Williams. Label: Naxos American
- The Ocean. National Symphony Orchestra of Ukraine. conductor John Mclaughlin Williams. Label: Naxos American
- Afterglow: The Forgotten Works for Cello and Piano by Henry Hadley. Theodore Buchholz and Paula Fan. Label: Centaur
- Elegie. Arthur Hadley, cello; Henry Hadley, piano. Label: Rishell (vertical cut 78 RPM)
- Piano Quintet in A minor. Kohon String Quartet with Isabelle Byman. Label: Vox
- Piano Trio in G minor (1932). Rawlins Piano Trio. Label: Albany Records
- Salome. Royal Philharmonic Orchestra. conductor Karl Krueger. Label: Bridge
- Scherzo Diabolique. Albany Symphony Orchestra. conductor Julius Hegyi Label: New World Records
- Symphony No. 2 The Four Seasons. Royal Philharmonic Orchestra. conductor Karl Krueger. Label: Bridge
- Symphony No. 4 North, East, South, West. National Symphony Orchestra of Ukraine. conductor John Mclaughlin Williams. Label: Naxos American
